= Patent Prosecution Highway =

The Patent Prosecution Highway (PPH) is a set of initiatives for providing accelerated patent prosecution procedures by sharing information between some patent offices. It also permits each participating patent office to benefit from the work previously done by the other patent office, with the goal of reducing examination workload and improving patent quality.

An updated "PPH 2.0" system under the program name "Mottainai" (a Japanese word meaning "wasteful") began among several national patent offices in mid-2011.

== Cooperations (examples) ==
A number of patent offices are participating to PPH schemes. The following are examples of cooperations:

- Canadian Intellectual Property Office (CIPO) - United States Patent and Trademark Office (USPTO): A one-year pilot program commenced on January 28, 2008. The trial period has been extended for a period of two years ending on January 28, 2011, "[in] order to adequately assess the feasibility of the PPH pilot program".
- Danish Patent and Trademark Office (DKPTO) - Japan Patent Office (JPO): Implemented since 1 July 2008.
- DKPTO - USPTO: A trial period started on 3 November 2008 and is set to expire 3 November 2009.)
- European Patent Office (EPO) - USPTO: A one-year trial cooperation program ("PPH Pilot Programme") commenced on 29 September 2008, for a period of one year ending on 29 September 2009. It was then extended for an additional period of 12 months, effective as of 30 September 2009.
- EPO - JPO: Launch of a bilateral PPH pilot with effect on 29 January 2010.
- IP Australia (IPAU) - USPTO: A one-year pilot program under PPH 2.0 commenced on January 29, 2012, and was extended indefinitely in July 2012.
- JPO - USPTO: The pilot program started in July 2006. The trial period was originally scheduled to last for one year, but was extended until January 3, 2008. The program has been implemented on a full-time basis since January 4, 2008.
- JPO - Korean Intellectual Property Office (KIPO): The pilot program started in April 2007.
- JPO - UK-IPO: A one-year pilot program commenced on July 1, 2007. Following the pilot program it was announced that the PPH program would be made permanent.
- JPO - German Patent and Trade Mark Office (GPTO): A pilot program was announced in March 2008.
- JPO - Malaysian Intellectual Property Office (MYIPO): With effect from 1 October 2014, MyIPO started a pilot PPH/PCT-PPH programs with the Japan Patent Office (JPO).
- JPO - National Board of Patents and Registration of Finland (PRH): The pilot began on 20 April 2009 and initially ran for two years (until the end of March 2011). It was announced that a decision on extending the pilot would be made at the end of the second year.
- KIPO - USPTO: A one-year pilot program commenced on January 28, 2008 and ended on January 28, 2009. The Patent Prosecution Highway is implemented on a full-time basis since January 29, 2009.
- Taiwan Intellectual Property Office (TIPO) - USPTO: A pilot program was scheduled for September 1, 2011 - August 31, 2012.
- UK-IPO - USPTO: A one-year pilot program commenced on September 4, 2007. The USPTO has decided to extend the PPH pilot program until further notice.
- Israel Patent Office (ILPO) - USPTO: A one-year pilot program commenced on July 1, 2011.
- IPO - JPO: A three-year pilot program commenced on November 21, 2019 between India and Japan.
- Eurasian Patent Organization (EAPO): implements a PPH program in cooperation with the Japan Patent Office, European Patent Office, China National Intellectual Property Administration, Korean Intellectual Property Office, and the Finnish Patent and Registration Office.

== Trilateral PCT-Patent Prosecution Highway (PCT-PPH) ==
A Patent Cooperation Treaty/Patent Prosecution Highway (PCT/PPH) pilot program was also started on 29 January 2010 for a planned period of two years. This pilot program enables to "[fast-track] patent examination procedures for PCT applications that have received a positive written opinion of either the International Searching Authority or the International Preliminary Examining Authority, or an international preliminary examination report from the European Patent Office (EPO), the Japan Patent Office (JPO) or the United States Patent and Trademark Office (USPTO)."

== IP5 patent prosecution highway (IP5-PPH) ==
On 6 January 2016, a patent prosecution highway program was launched between the five intellectual property offices

- European Patent Office,
- Japan Patent Office,
- Korean Intellectual Property Office,
- China National Intellectual Property Administration of China, and
- United States Patent and Trademark Office.

A decision was made in 2016 to extend the duration of the programme by three years. The European Patent Office published in its official journal that the program is going to available from 6 January 2017 until 5 January 2020. Participation in the program before the European Patent Office requires that substantive examination of the European patent application has not started yet. The starting date of substantive examination of a European patent application is publicly available from the European Patent Register via file inspection.

== See also ==
- Patent application
- Patent prosecution
- Public participation in patent examination
- Trilateral Patent Offices
- Backlog of unexamined patent applications
