= IP5 (intellectual property offices) =

Forum of intellectual property offices

IP5 is a forum of the five largest intellectual property offices in the world. The five patent offices are the US Patent and Trademark Office (USPTO), the European Patent Office (EPO), the Japan Patent Office (JPO), the Korean Intellectual Property Office (KIPO), and the National Intellectual Property Administration (CNIPA formerly SIPO) in China.

On 6 January 2014, the IP5 members started IP5 PPH Patent Prosecution Highway pilot program, which has been extended several times since (the most recent agreed extension ends in 2023). The IP5 Patent Prosecution Highway pilot program shares the patent examination reports (such as Written Opinions and International Preliminary Examinations of the Patent Cooperation Treaty as well as national stage examinations) between the five offices. If one of the offices allows a claim, the other offices may allow it as well without additional examination on the basis of the prior examination only.

In 2015, the IP5 patent offices together granted about one million patents.

== See also ==
- Trilateral Patent Offices
