= Patent prosecution =

Legal proceeding

Patent prosecution is the interaction between applicants and a patent office with regard to a patent application or a patent.

The prosecution process is broadly divided into two phases: pre-grant and post-grant prosecution. Pre-grant prosecution includes the drafting and filing of patent applications, responding to patent office actions, and navigating the examination process to meet all legal requirements for patentability. This phase requires a strategic presentation of the invention's novelty and inventive step over existing technologies. Post-grant prosecution deals with activities that occur after a patent has been granted. This includes maintaining the patent, handling oppositions or challenges from third parties, and making amendments or corrections to the patent documentation. It ensures that the patent remains enforceable and continues to provide value to the patent holder. Patent prosecution is distinct from patent litigation, which describes legal action relating to the infringement of patents.

The rules and laws governing patent prosecution are often laid out in manuals released by the Patent Offices of various governments, such as the Manual of Patent Examining Procedure (MPEP) in the United States, or the Manual of Patent Office Practice (MOPOP) in Canada. The formalities and substantive requirements for filing patent applications and for granting patents vary from one country or region to the other.

== Pre-grant prosecution ==
=== Preparation of an application ===
To obtain patent rights for an inventor, the practitioner typically first drafts an application by interviewing the inventor to understand the nature of the invention and help clarify its novel features. Practitioners need to ascertain what is already known to people familiar with the general field of the invention—such already-known material is termed the prior art, and to obtain drawings and written notes regarding the features of the invention and the background.

During this initial phase, sometimes termed "patent preparation", the practitioner may also seek to determine precisely who contributed to the making of the invention. A prior public disclosure of the invention (or a sale offer) or an incorrect listing of inventors may incurably invalidate any patent that might result from an application.

This determination is particularly important in the United States, but may be considered less important in other jurisdictions, because in the US, applications are required to be filed by inventor(s) rather than by patent owner(s). The practitioner may also seek to find out whether any publications, offers for sale, or other such public disclosures of the invention were made. In the U.S. these laws are laid out in Title 35 of the United States Code, §102.

Under the rules of most jurisdictions, inventor’s own public disclosure or an offer to sell an invention, prior to filing an application for a patent, counts as a public prior art, which destroys the novelty of the patent application and prevents the issuance of a patent. As of May 2023, some countries (e.g. Argentina, Australia, Belarus, Brazil, Canada, Estonia, PR China, Japan (since June 2018), South Korea, Mexico, New Zealand, Russia, Ukraine, the US and Turkey) give the inventor(s) a one-year grace period, when their own disclosures do not count as a prior art to a subsequent patent application, although in practice it is difficult to take advantage of this rule. Austria, Germany, and the UK have a 6-month grace period. Notably, the World Intellectual Property Organization and the proposed Patent Law Treaty do not give any grace period to their patent applications. The practice of the grace period was more common prior to 1970 than it is today.

After drafting an application for patent, complying with any further rules (such as having the inventor or inventors review the application prior to filing), and obtaining the applicant's permission, the practitioner files the patent application with the patent office. Usually, the practitioner seeks to file the application as soon as possible, because in all countries/jurisdictions presently, if two or more applications on the same subject matter are filed, only the party who filed first will be entitled to a patent under the "first-to-file rule". Until the enactment of the America Invents Act, the United States followed a first-to-invent rule, under which early filing may prevent the use of certain materials from being applied against the patent application as prior art while the patent application is pending before the patent office. However, three consecutive congressional sessions in the United States from 2005–2009 have attempted to change the United States to the first-to-file rule with the Patent Reform Act of 2005, the Patent Reform Act of 2007, and the Patent Reform Act of 2009. Finally, on September 16, 2011, the United States shifted to the first-to-file rule with the enactment of the America Invents Act. Canada and the Philippines were among the last countries to use a first to invent system and they changed to first-to-file in 1989, and 1998 respectively.

=== Filing an application ===
Most patent applications have at least two components, including a general, written description of the invention and at least one "embodiment" thereof, and a set of "claims," written in a special style that defines exactly what the applicant regards as the particular features of his or her invention. These claims are used to distinguish the invention from the existing prior art, and are compared by the patent office to the prior art before issuing a patent.

Patent applications in most jurisdictions also usually include (and may be required to include) a drawing or set of drawings, to facilitate the understanding of the invention. In some jurisdictions, patent models may also be submitted to demonstrate the operation of the invention. In applications involving genetics, samples of genetic material or DNA sequences may be required.

=== Search and examination ===
More U.S. utility patents have been issued in the most recent thirty years than in the first 200 years in which they were issued (1790–1990).

The search and examination phases constitute the main part of the prosecution of a patent application leading to grant or refusal.

A search is conducted by the patent office for any prior art that is relevant to the application in question and the results of that search are notified to the applicant in a search report. Generally the examiner conducting the search indicates in what aspect the documents cited are relevant (novelty, inventive step, background) and to what claims they are relevant. The materials searched vary depending on the patent office conducting the search, but principally cover all published patent applications and technical publications. The patent office can provide a preliminary, non-binding, opinion on patentability, to indicate to the applicant its views on the patentability and let the applicant decide how to proceed at an early stage.

The search report is typically published with the patent application, 18 months after the earliest priority date, or if it is not available at that time it is published once it is available.

The examination of patent applications may either be conducted at the same time as the search (as in the US, where a search report is not issued), or at a later date after the Applicant has requested examination (as, for example, under the EPC).

Examination is the process by which a patent office determines whether a patent application meets the requirements for granting a patent. The process involves considering whether the invention is novel and inventive, whether the invention is in an excluded area and whether the application complies with the various formalities of the relevant patent law.

If the examiner finds that the application does not comply with requirements, an examination report (Office action in the US) is issued drawing the examiner's objections to the attention of the applicant and requesting that they be addressed. The applicant may respond to the objections by arguing in support of the application, or making amendments to the application to bring it in conformity. Alternatively, if the examiner's objections are valid and cannot be overcome, the application may be abandoned.

The process of objection and response is repeated until the patent is in a form suitable for grant, the Applicant abandons the applications, or a hearing is arranged to resolve the matter.

For 2021, the patent grant rate was 62.7% for the EPO, 74.8% for the JPO, 74.0% for the KIPO, 55.0% for the CNIPA, and 79.2% for the USPTO.

In some jurisdictions, substantive examination of patent applications is not routinely carried out. Instead, the validity of invention registrations is dealt with during any infringement action.

The search and examination process is principally conducted between the patent office and the applicant. However, in some jurisdictions, it is possible for interested third parties to file opinions on the patentability of an application. Such opinions may take the form of a formal pre-grant opposition inter partes procedure or it may simply be an opportunity of filing observations as a third party. Reform legislation is set to create an opposition system in the United States.

An applicant is free to abandon an application during the search and examination process. An application may be abandoned if, for example, prior art is revealed which will prevent the grant of a patent and the applicant decides to save cost by terminating the application. An application may be deemed abandoned by the patent office if the applicant fails to meet any of the requirements of the application process, for example replying to an examination report.

=== Deferred examination ===
In some jurisdictions (such as Japan and South Korea), after filing an application, examination is optional, and only on request, rather than automatic. For example, in Japan, an application is published at 18 months after the priority date, but otherwise the application lies fallow until the applicant demands examination, up to seven years after filing. This gives the applicant time to evaluate which applications are worth spending money on, and which should simply be abandoned. Only a portion of the total number of filed applications is selected for examination by the applicants.

=== Expedited Examination ===
An expedited examination program allows for examination of a patent application in an expedited manner. To address the issue of patent pendency (the time it takes for a patent office to evaluate and grant or reject a patent application) and serve the needs of innovators/applicants efficiently, many Intellectual Property Offices (IPOs) have implemented such programs. Specific conditions to be met to qualify for accelerated examination are different from one office to another and between various types of programs in the same office.

=== Invention registration ===
Some jurisdictions including Bermuda, South Africa, China (in the case of Utility Models), Germany (in the case of Gebrauchsmusters (Utility Model)) and by option Spain, go one step further, in that an application is passed to issue and publication as an enforceable patent in short order, with no substantive examination. Questions of novelty and non-obviousness/inventive step are not reviewed until litigation may arise concerning the issues. Obviously, such a patent does not carry the same presumption of validity as a patent that has been fully examined. Such systems are known as "invention registration" regimes, and have the benefit of reduced costs, because applicants may postpone or completely forego the expensive process of examination for inventions that are of small or speculative value in the applicant's field of endeavor. Another advantage is that a patent is granted relatively fast. A patent in South Africa, for example, is granted approximately 8 months after the date of filing, whereas in examining countries, it is highly unusual for a patent to be granted in less than 3 years. At the same time, simply filing an application usually preserves the applicant's right to subsequently seek full examination and protection for his invention, if a competitor or a pirate is later discovered to infringe the invention.

=== Appeals ===
However, if the examiner and the applicant cannot reach agreement regarding the patentability of the application, the applicant may file an appeal to either the patent office or a court of law, asserting that his patent application was wrongly rejected. For such an appeal to be successful, the applicant must prove that the patent office was incorrect in applying the law, interpreting the claims on the patent application, or interpreting and applying of the prior art vis-à-vis the patent application. If the appeal is successful, the patent office or court may order that a patent be issued based on the application, or that the patent office correct its examination of the application if the patent office is found to have been incorrect. Otherwise, if the applicant is not found convincing, the rejection of the patent application may be upheld.

In the United States, appeals are fairly rare. The Board of Patent Appeals and Interferences adjudicates only about 1 – 2% of all issued patents. For controversial areas such as business method patents, however, the appeals rate is much higher. About 10% of the business method patents issued in 2006 were appealed. In some areas, such as insurance patents, the rate is as high as 30%.

=== Abandonment ===
Patent abandonment refers to the process by which an applicant voluntarily or involuntarily discontinues the pursuit of a patent application.

Generally, an applicant is free to abandon his or her patent application at any time, and in many jurisdictions may "disclaim" his or her patent even after the patent is issued. Such abandonment may occur during the prosecution process, such as when the applicant is unable to convince the patent office to withdraw a rejection of his or her patent application. Further, abandonment is often held to have occurred if the applicant fails to respond within a certain time period to an office action issued by the patent office, or if the applicant specifically expresses his or her intention to abandon the application.

The rate at which patent applications are abandoned can vary significantly from one technology to another. In the US, patent applications in the field of electrical connectors, for example, are abandoned at a low rate of only one abandonment for every 18 office actions (e.g. rejections). Business method patent applications, however, are abandoned at a much higher rate of one abandonment for every 5 office actions.

In some jurisdictions, applicants are required to pay annual maintenance fees (also known as renewal fees) while the patent application is still pending. This can significantly impact an applicant's decision to continue with the prosecution. Before paying these fees, applicants often reassess the commercial viability of their invention and may decide to abandon the application if the technology is no longer deemed valuable or promising.

Following abandonment, in most jurisdictions, an applicant is usually barred from later seeking patent protection for the same subject matter which was earlier abandoned by the applicant. In some jurisdictions, applicants may be able to revive an abandoned application within a certain time frame or under specific conditions, such as unintentional abandonment.

== Post-grant prosecution ==
=== Opposition ===
Post-grant opposition occurs after a patent has been granted, providing a window during which third parties can contest the validity of the patent. This procedure allows challengers to present arguments and evidence to the patent office, aiming to revoke or amend the granted patent if it is found to lack novelty, inventive step, or does not comply with other patentability criteria. Post-grant opposition serves as an efficient and cost-effective alternative to litigation for disputing a patent's validity. It helps maintain the integrity of the patent system by ensuring that only patents meeting all legal standards remain in force, thereby balancing the rights of patent holders with the interests of the public and competitors.

In the European Patent Office, for example, any person may file opposition to the grant of a European patent within nine months from grant. In Israel, a third party may oppose an allowed application for three months after publication of the allowed application.

=== Reissue, reexamination and interference ===
A re-examination is a proceeding conducted by the patent office after the grant of a patent in which the validity of a patent is re-examined at the request of the patentee or third party, as provided by the applicable law.

In some countries, a re-examination system is provided as an alternative or complement to the opposition system. In comparison to the opposition system, in general, the re‑examination is not time-bound and can be requested during the lifetime of the patent. In some countries the re-examination is conducted by a single examiner or the division of the patent office which has granted the patent in the first place, in comparison to a full opposition board in the cases of post-grant oppositions.

==== In the United States ====
In some jurisdictions, such as the United States, the patent holder may even seek to broaden the scope of the invention defined in the claims by filing a reissue application, although a broadening reissue in the USA must be filed within 2 years from grant. Also, in the United States, only the patent holder may file for reissue. The case of In Re Tanaka established the principle that a patentee can add narrow dependent claims to an issued patent through the reissue process, because a patent with narrower dependent claims is less subject to invalidation when litigated. More usually, however, the patentee must identify errors in the original claims, thereby surrendering some claim scope in return.

In the United States, "reexamination" refers to the process of requesting that the patent office once again subject an issued patent to further examination, accompanied by patents or printed publications showing that there is a substantial new question of patentability ("SNQ"), and/or an explanation of the relevance of the prior art to the claimed invention. Unlike other invalidity considerations, only patents and printed publications will be considered in re-examination; see 37 CFR 1.552. Unlike reissue, reexamination may be requested not only by the patent holder or inventor, but by anyone, including anonymously, although whoever requests reexamination must also submit a fee, which is substantially higher than filing a new patent application. A benefit of reexamination is that issued patents may be either invalidated or once again deemed valid, without the considerable cost and lengthy time required for a patent infringement lawsuit or declaratory judgment action.

Also, in the United States, prior to the America Invents Act going into force in 2012, if two patent applications are filed which set forth claims directed to the same subject matter, the patent office could declare an "interference" and require that each of the parties appear before the patent office to determine who was the earliest to discover the claimed invention. This "interference practice" is not followed in most other jurisdictions, because it is obviated by the "first-to-file" system used in most countries. During an interference, parties may submit evidence supporting their contention to be the earliest inventor, and the patent office issues a decision following the trial-like interference process. Interference practice does not apply to patents filed after September 12, 2012, because the U.S. moved to a first-to-disclose system which is in many ways similar to first-to-file.

== Patent agents and attorneys ==
In some jurisdictions only authorized practitioners can act before the patent office, although applicants (e.g., inventors) can generally represent themselves. This is known as pro se representation.

It is usually recommended that an applicant not represent him- or herself pro se. In the United-States, for example, a patent examiner will issue the following form paragraph if it is apparent that an applicant is not familiar with patent office policies and procedures:

¶ 4.10 Employ Services of Attorney or Agent

An examination of this application reveals that applicant is unfamiliar with patent prosecution procedure. While an inventor may prosecute the application, lack of skill in this field usually acts as a liability in affording the maximum protection for the invention disclosed. Applicant is advised to secure the services of a registered patent attorney or agent to prosecute the application, since the value of a patent is largely dependent upon skilled preparation and prosecution. The Office cannot aid in selecting an attorney or agent.

A listing of registered patent attorneys and agents is available on the USPTO Internet web site http://www.uspto.gov in the Site Index under "Attorney and Agent Roster". Applicants may also obtain a list of registered patent attorneys and agents located in their area by writing to the Mail Stop OED, Director of the U.S. Patent and Trademark Office, P.O. Box 1450, Alexandria, VA 22313-1450.

=== Confidentiality of communications between clients and their patent agents and attorneys ===
Confidentiality between clients and their patent advisors is a fundamental aspect of the patent prosecution process. It allows inventors and applicants to freely share all relevant information—including sensitive technical details and potential legal issues—without fear that these communications will be disclosed to third parties or become public. This open dialogue is essential for patent advisors to provide comprehensive and effective legal counsel, ensuring that inventions are adequately protected and that all legal requirements are fully met.

In many jurisdictions, patent advisors are bound by professional codes of conduct and legal regulations that mandate the confidentiality of client communications. Breaches of this confidentiality can result in severe consequences, such as disciplinary actions, fines, or even imprisonment. However, the extent of this protection varies significantly across different legal systems. For example, in some common law countries, communications between clients and patent advisors who are not qualified lawyers may not be granted the same privilege as those with attorneys, potentially exposing such communications during legal proceedings like discovery.

The international nature of patent prosecution adds complexity to maintaining confidentiality. While some countries extend confidentiality protections to communications with both local and foreign patent advisors, others do not recognize privilege for advice received from advisors qualified in another jurisdiction. This disparity can lead to situations where confidential communications in one country may be subject to disclosure in another, undermining the protection of sensitive information. As a result, clients and patent advisors must navigate a patchwork of national laws to ensure that confidentiality is preserved throughout the patent prosecution process globally.

== Modern challenges with patent prosecution ==
The patent prosecution landscape is undergoing significant change due to the generative AI revolution. AI-assisted tools allow practitioners to perform tasks such as prior art searching, drafting specifications, and responding to office actions more efficiently, contributing to growing expectations that prosecution should be faster, more cost-effective, and higher throughput. The adoption of these tools is reshaping the roles of patent attorneys, agents, and other stakeholders, while raising considerations around quality, confidentiality, transparency, and professional standards.

Patent offices are also exploring AI-assisted examination workflows, including tools for prior art search and analysis, which can reduce search times and backlogs while introducing new operational and policy considerations for examination practice.

=== AI tools for practitioners ===
AI-driven platforms support prosecution-related tasks such as automated retrieval and summarization of office actions, categorization of examiner objections, and preliminary drafting of responses. These systems can integrate search, drafting, and quality review into a unified workflow and support multiple jurisdictions, including the USPTO and EPO.

Academic research has explored language models and recommender systems to automate or assist with office action responses, focusing on efficiency and performance metrics. Other experimental work has trained LLMs specifically to improve claim drafting based on feedback from granted applications.

=== AI in patent offices ===
Patent offices worldwide are integrating AI and machine learning tools to support examination processes. According to the World Intellectual Property Organization (WIPO), more than 70 AI-related initiatives have been deployed across over 27 national offices, many focusing on AI-enabled prior art search to accelerate examination and reduce backlogs.

In the United States, the USPTO has introduced the Artificial Intelligence Search Automated Pilot (ASAP!), providing applicants with an AI-Assisted Search Results Notice (ASRN) prior to formal examination. The USPTO has also integrated machine-learning tools into its PE2E search suite, including a similarity search function to identify relevant prior art. These tools support internal analysis of office actions and prosecution workflows. Concerns regarding security, confidentiality, and unpredictability have led to restrictions on external AI use by some patent office employees.

=== Changing role of patent attorneys and agents ===
The integration of AI in patent prosecution is altering how patent professionals allocate their time. Routine tasks, such as document review and drafting standard responses, can now be assisted by AI, allowing attorneys and agents to focus on strategic oversight, legal reasoning, and client counseling.

Human review remains critical, as AI-generated outputs may contain errors or legally risky content. Ethical and confidentiality considerations are heightened, particularly regarding client data and the potential need to disclose AI involvement in patent applications. Over-reliance on AI could risk superficial applications, misaligned claims, or reduced nuanced legal reasoning, but it also allows practitioners to devote more attention to inventive arguments, strategic amendments, and cross-jurisdiction coordination.

=== Risks, challenges, and future outlook ===
- Accuracy and hallucination risk: AI-generated content may be plausible but incorrect.
- Transparency and disclosure: Questions arise regarding how and when AI involvement should be reported in patent filings.
- Regulatory response: Patent offices and professional bodies may develop guidelines for AI use, including data privacy, model training, and workflow standards.
- Skill evolution: Attorneys may need new skills, such as prompt design, AI supervision, and understanding model behavior.
- Sustainability: Long-term adoption depends on consistent quality, demonstrated efficiency gains, and ethical use.

== See also ==
- Public participation in patent examination
- Patent Prosecution Highway (prosecution cooperation between some patent offices)
- Backlog of unexamined patent applications
