= Triadic patent =

Triadic patents are a series of corresponding patents filed at the European Patent Office (EPO), the United States Patent and Trademark Office (USPTO) and the Japan Patent Office (JPO), for the same invention, by the same applicant or inventor. Triadic patents form a special type of patent family.

== See also ==
- Trilateral Patent Offices
