= European Patent Organisation =

European patent administrative organisation

The European Patent Organisation (sometimes abbreviated EPOrg in order to distinguish it from the European Patent Office, one of the two organs of the organisation) is a public international organisation created in 1977 by its contracting states to grant patents in Europe under the European Patent Convention (EPC) of 1973. The European Patent Organisation has its seat at Munich, Germany, and has administrative and financial autonomy. The organisation is independent from the European Union, and has as member states all 27 EU member states along with 13 other European states.

The evolution of the Organisation is inherently linked to that of the European Patent Convention. See European Patent Convention (EPC) for the history of the European patent system as set up by the EPC, operated by the European Patent Office (EPO), and supervised by the Administrative Council of the European Patent Organisation.

== Organs ==
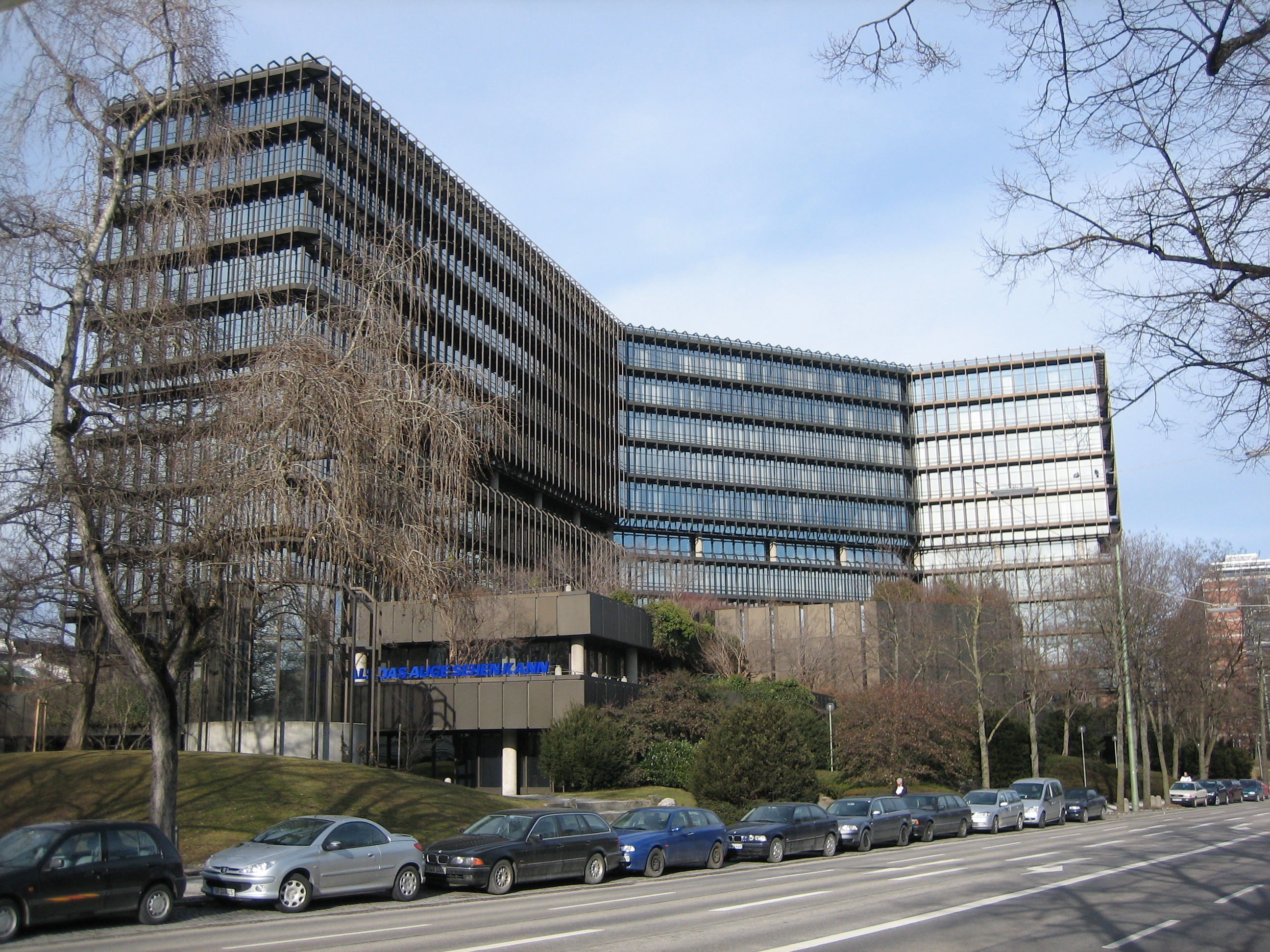
European Patent Office headquarters in Munich

The European Patent Organisation has two organs: the European Patent Office, which acts as its executive body, and the Administrative Council, which acts as its supervisory body as well as, to a limited extent, its legislative body. The actual legislative power to revise the European Patent Convention lies with the Contracting States themselves when meeting at a Conference of the Contracting States.

Besides, the Boards of Appeal, which do not form an independent organ of the Organisation but are integrated within the European Patent Office, are assigned the role of an independent judiciary. The European Patent Organisation is in that sense an international organisation "modelled on a modern state order and based on the separation of powers principle".

=== European Patent Office ===
The European Patent Office (EPO (Note: The abbreviation "EPOff" has been also used to refer to the European Patent Office, in order to distinguish it from the European Patent Organisation, see European Patent Office web site, European Patent Convention (EPC), Alphabetical keyword index. Consulted on 17 November 2007.)) examines European patent applications and grants European patents under the European Patent Convention. Its headquarters are located at Munich, Germany, with a branch in Rijswijk (near The Hague, Netherlands), sub-offices in Berlin, Germany, and Vienna, Austria, and a "liaison bureau" in Brussels, Belgium.

=== Administrative Council ===
The Administrative Council is made up of Representatives and alternate Representatives of the Contracting States and is responsible for overseeing the work of the European Patent Office, ratifying the budget and approving the actions of the President of the Office. The council also amends the Rules of the EPC and some particular provisions of the Articles of the European Patent Convention.

As of 2019, the Chairman of the Administrative Council is Josef Kratochvíl.

== Legal status ==
The European Patent Organisation has legal personality, and is represented by the President of the European Patent Office.

== Member states, extension state, and validation states ==
There are, as of June 2026, 40 Contracting States to the EPC, also called member states of the European Patent Organisation: Albania, Austria, Belgium, Bulgaria, Croatia, Cyprus, Czech Republic, Denmark, Estonia, Finland, France, Germany, Greece, Hungary, Iceland, Ireland, Italy, Latvia, Liechtenstein, Lithuania, Luxembourg, Malta, Moldova, Monaco, Montenegro, Netherlands, North Macedonia, Norway, Poland, Portugal, Romania, San Marino, Serbia, Slovakia, Slovenia, Spain, Sweden, Switzerland, Turkey, and the United Kingdom (see European Patent Convention article for the dates of entry in force in each country). That is, all EU member states are also members of the European Patent Organisation, and, additionally, Albania, Iceland, Liechtenstein, Moldova, Monaco, Montenegro, North Macedonia, Norway, San Marino, Serbia, Switzerland, Turkey, and the United Kingdom are also members of the European Patent Organisation. The most recent member state to join the EPC was Moldova which did so on 1 June 2026.

In addition, there is one "extension state", Bosnia and Herzegovina, which is not a Contracting State to the EPC but has signed an extension agreement under which the protection conferred by European patent applications and patents is extended to the relevant country. Slovenia, Romania, Lithuania, Latvia, Croatia, North Macedonia, Albania, Serbia, and Montenegro were all extension states prior to joining the EPC.

Furthermore, there are so-called "validation states", which are not Contracting States to the EPC but have signed validation agreements that act similarly to the extension agreements to extend the protection of European patent applications and European patents. Morocco, Tunisia, Cambodia, Georgia, and Laos became validation states on 1 March 2015, 1 December 2017, 1 March 2018, 15 January 2024, and 1 April 2025, respectively. Furthermore, Costa Rica has signed a validation agreement on 13 December 2024 that has not yet entered into force. Moldova was validation state prior to joining the EPC.

== See also ==
- Eurasian Patent Organization
- European Union Intellectual Property Office (EUIPO), dealing with trademarks and industrial designs for the European Union
- International Patent Institute (IIB), established in 1947 and integrated into the European Patent Organisation on its creation
- Patent examiner
- Trilateral Patent Offices
