= Intellectual Property Law Certification =

Certification in law

Intellectual Property Law Certification is offered by the Florida Bar.

== Purpose ==
The purpose of the standards is to identify those lawyers who practice intellectual property law and have the special knowledge, skills, and proficiency, as well as the character, ethics, and reputation for professionalism, to be properly identified to the public as certified intellectual property lawyers.

== Qualifications ==
Minimum standards for certification in intellectual property law include at least five years of full time law practice during the five years immediately preceding the date of application; substantial involvement 30 percent or more in the practice of intellectual property law during the three years preceding application; experience in patent prosecution, patent infringement litigation, trademark law and/or copyright law (40 patent matters, five contested matters in litigation or on appeal, six contested trademark matters or 25 responses to substantive refusals, 40 substantive copyright law matters involving representation of a client); peer review; completion of 45 hours of continuing legal education within the three years immediately preceding application, and a written examination demonstrating knowledge, skills and proficiency in the field of intellectual property law.

== History ==
The Florida Bar established Intellectual Property Law Certification in 2006.
132 attorneys were certified as of May 9, 2014, in Intellectual Property by the Florida Bar.
