= Trilateral Patent Offices =

Offices of Europe, Japan and the US

The Trilateral Patent Offices, or simply the Trilateral Offices, are the European Patent Office (EPO), the Japan Patent Office (JPO) and the United States Patent and Trademark Office (USPTO). In 1983, these patent offices set up a programme of co-operation in an effort to "improve efficiency of the global patent system".

== History ==
The EPO, JPO and USPTO handle the majority of the world's patent applications. In 1983, these patent offices set up a programme of co-operation in an effort to "improve efficiency of the global patent system" and to exchange information and views on patent administration and examination practice in order to gain mutual benefits.

== Co-operation areas ==
Key areas of co-operation include the development of a common system architecture for electronic exchange of documents such as priority documents, developing standards for electronic filing of patent applications and genetic sequence submissions, harmonisation of patent practices, and developing common patent information dissemination policies.

=== Business method patents ===
In June 2000, the Trilateral Offices released the results of a study on business method related inventions entitled. This report concluded that the mere automation of a known human transaction process using well known automation techniques was not patentable, and that a technical aspect was necessary for a computer implemented business method to be patentable, although this aspect need only be implicit in US claims.

It was decided that an important area of focus should be collaboration on searching prior art in the business method field. In November 2001, the Trilateral Offices released the results of a study of search tools and strategies. The report concluded that each Office’s ability to search the prior art for business method inventions was satisfactory but that the EPO and USPTO should make more use of the JPO search documentation and vice versa and that there should be more exchange of non-patent literature (NPL) searching information.

== See also ==
- Eurasian Patent Organization
- Triadic patent
- Patent Prosecution Highway (PPH)
- IP5 (intellectual property offices)
