= Kokoku (patent law) =

Examined and approved Japanese patent application

A kokoku or kokoku tokkyo koho is an examined and approved Japanese patent application, published for opposition, in contrast to the kokai, the published ("laid-open"), unexamined Japanese patent application. The kokoku system of publishing for opposition was abolished in 1996.

== See also ==
- Japanese patent law
