= Patent Cooperation Treaty =

International patent law treaty

- Signed: 19 June 1970
- Location: Washington D.C., United States
- Effective: 24 January 1978
- Condition: Ratification by eight states, four of which have significant patenting activity
- Signatories: 36
- Parties: 159
- Depositary: Director-General of the World Intellectual Property Organization (WIPO)
- Languages: English; French

The Patent Cooperation Treaty (PCT) is an international patent law treaty, concluded in 1970. It provides a unified procedure for filing patent applications to protect inventions in each of its contracting states. A patent application filed under the PCT is called an international application, or PCT application.

A single filing of a PCT application is made with a Receiving Office (RO) in one language. It then results in a search performed by an International Searching Authority (ISA), accompanied by a written opinion regarding the patentability of the invention, which is the subject of the application. It is optionally followed by a preliminary examination, performed by an International Preliminary Examining Authority (IPEA). Finally, the relevant national or regional authorities administer matters related to the examination of application (if provided by national law) and issuance of patent.

A PCT application does not itself result in the grant of a patent, since there is no such thing as an "international patent", and the grant of patent is a prerogative of each national or regional authority. In other words, a PCT application, which establishes a filing date in all contracting states, must be followed up with the step of entering into national or regional phases to proceed towards grant of one or more patents. The PCT procedure essentially leads to a standard national or regional patent application, which may be granted or rejected according to applicable law, in each jurisdiction in which a patent is desired.

The contracting states, the states which are parties to the PCT, constitute the International Patent Cooperation Union.

== History ==
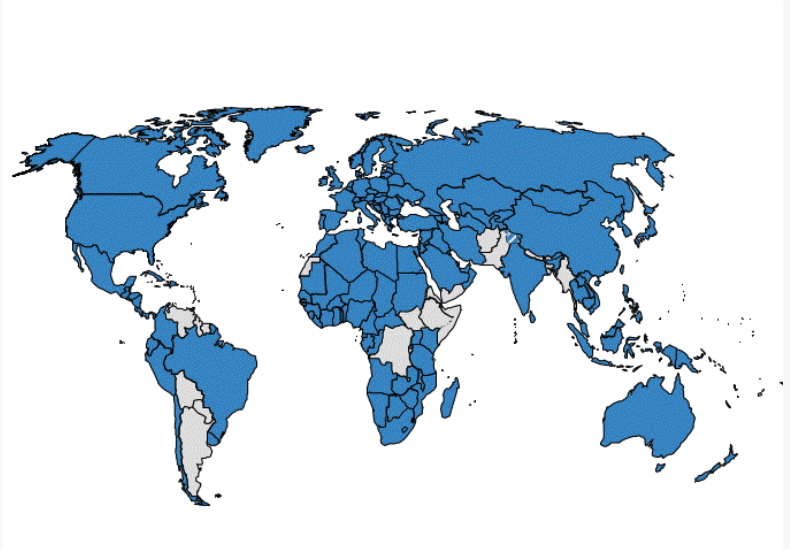
The 158 Patent Cooperation Treaty members, as of August 2025

The Washington Diplomatic Conference on the Patent Cooperation Treaty was held in Washington from 25 May to 19 June 1970. The Patent Cooperation Treaty was signed on the last day of the conference on 19 June 1970. The Treaty entered into force on 24 January 1978, initially with 18 contracting states. The first international applications were filed on 1 June 1978. The Treaty was subsequently amended in 1979, and modified in 1984 and 2001. As of August 19, 2026, PCT membership consisted of 159 contracting states. It was expected that by the end of 2020 the total number of PCT applications filed since the system became operational in 1978 would reach 4 million.

== Parties ==
Any contracting state to the Paris Convention for the Protection of Industrial Property can become a member of the PCT. A majority of the world's countries are parties to the PCT, including all of the major industrialized countries (with a few exceptions, notably Argentina, Venezuela and Pakistan). As of 19 August 2026, there were 159 contracting states to the PCT.

== Procedure ==
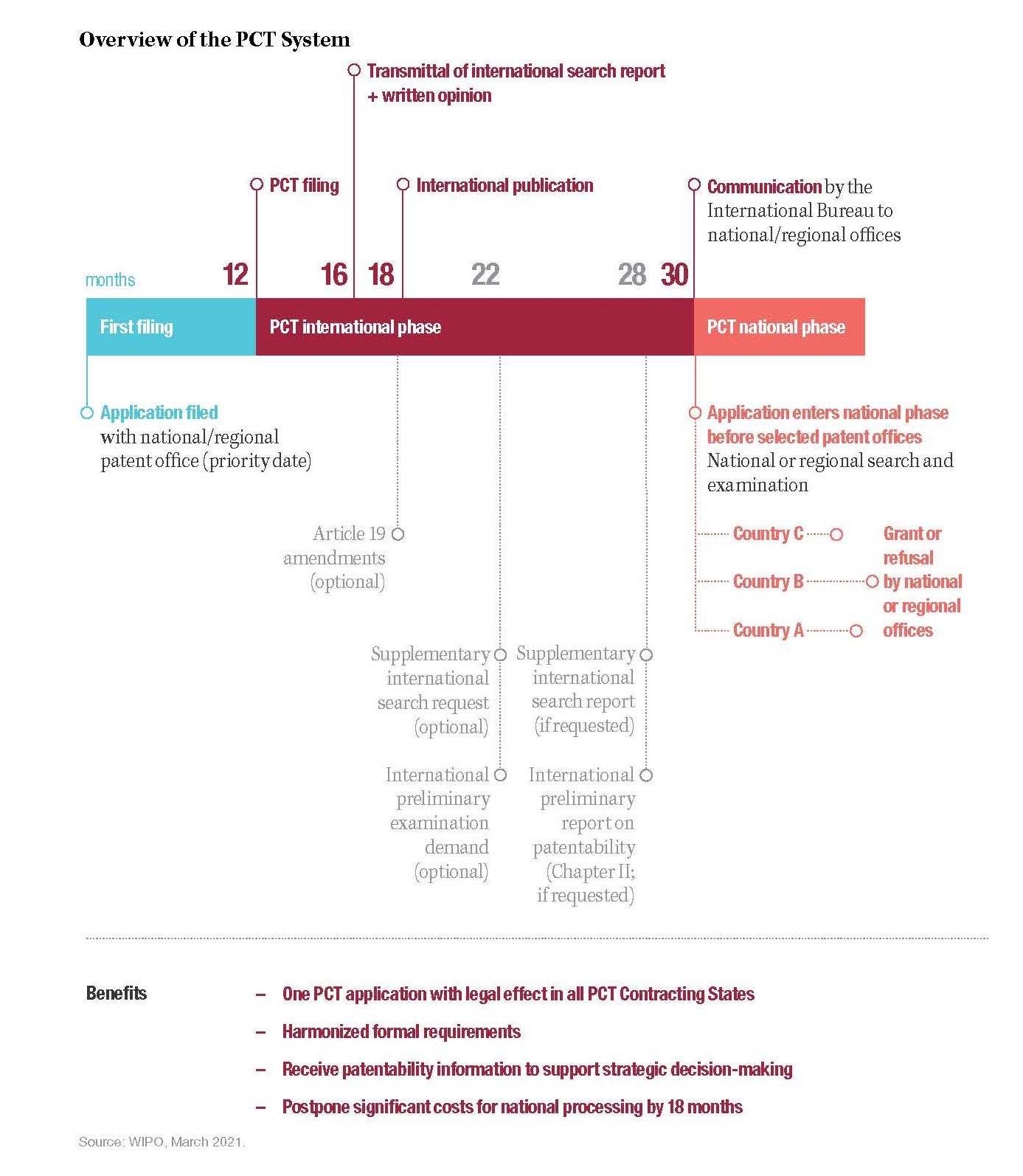
A timeline diagram which provides an overview of the Patent Cooperation Treaty System

The main advantages of the PCT procedure, also referred to as the international procedure, are that (a) it allows the filing of a single patent application, replacing the need for filing a multiplicity of separate applications, with a procedure taking place in a predictable way; (b) the international search and, optionally, the international preliminary examination "give applicants a better basis for deciding whether and in which countries to further pursue their applications", thus allowing "for better management of patent portfolios and the avoidance of unnecessary expenses"; and (c) it allows the deferral of national processing.

A PCT application (also called "international patent application") has two phases. The first phase is the international phase in which patent protection is pending under a single patent application filed with the patent office of a contracting state of the PCT. The second phase is the national and regional phase which follows the international phase in which rights are continued by filing necessary documents with the patent offices of separate contracting states of the PCT. A PCT application, as such, is not an actual request that a patent be granted, and it is not converted into one unless and until it enters the "national phase".

=== Filing ===
The first step of the procedure consists in filing an international (patent) application with a competent patent office, called a Receiving Office (RO). This application is called an international application or simply a PCT application since it neither results in an international patent nor in a PCT patent, neither of which exists. The PCT application needs to be filed in one language only, although a translation of the application may be required for the international search and the international publication, depending on the language of filing and the competent or chosen International Searching Authority.

At least one applicant (either a physical or legal person) must be a national or resident of a contracting state to the PCT; otherwise, no PCT filing date is accorded. If a PCT filing date is erroneously accorded, the Receiving Office may, within four months from the filing date, declare that the application should be considered withdrawn. The requirement that at least one applicant must be a national or resident of a contracting state to the PCT needs, however, "only to be complied with at the time of filing the international application. Later changes in the applicant's country of residence (or nationality) ... have no consequence on the validity of the international application itself."

In most member states, the applicant or at least one of the applicants of the application is required to be a national or resident of the state of the receiving office where the application is filed. Applicants from any contracting state may file a PCT application at the International Bureau in Geneva, subject to national security provisions.

Upon filing of the PCT application, all contracting states are automatically designated. (Note: Applicable as from 1 January 2004.) (Note: Germany, Japan, and the Republic of Korea can be excluded from this all inclusive designation, if priority is claimed from an earlier national filing in the state concerned. See Rule 4.9(b) PCT notifications of incompatibility in "PCT Reservations, Declarations, Notifications and Incompatibilities (status on 18 September 2015)". WIPO.) Subject to reservations made by any contracting state, a PCT application fulfilling the requirements of the treaty and accorded a PCT filing date has the effect of a regular national application in each designated state as of the PCT filing date, which date is considered to be the actual filing date in each designated State.

International Searching Authorities (ISA) and International Preliminary Examining Authorities (IPEA)
1. Austrian Patent Office (AT).
2. Australian Patent Office (AU).
3. National Institute of Industrial Property (BR).
4. Canadian Intellectual Property Office (CA).
5. National Institute of Industrial Property of Chile (CL)
6. China's National Intellectual Property Administration (CN).
7. Egyptian Patent Office (EG).
8. European Patent Office (EP).
9. Spanish Patent and Trademark Office (ES).
10. Finnish Patent and Registration Office (FI).
11. Indian Patent Office (IN).
12. Israel Patent Office (IL).
13. Japan Patent Office (JP).
14. Korean Intellectual Property Office (KR).
15. Federal Service for Intellectual Property (Rospatent) (Russian Federation) (RU).
16. Swedish Patent and Registration Office (SE).
17. Intellectual Property Office of Singapore (SG)
18. Turkish Patent and Trademark Office
19. State Intellectual Property Service of Ukraine (UA).
20. United States Patent and Trademark Office (US).
21. Nordic Patent Institute (XN).
22. Visegrad Patent Institute (XV).
23. Intellectual Property Office of the Philippines (PH).
24. Eurasian Patent Organization (EA) (will begin operating as ISA and IPEA on 1 July 2022)
Note 1: All International Searching Authorities are also International Preliminary Examining Authorities.

=== Search and written opinion ===
A search or "international search" is then made by an authorized international searching authority (ISA) to find the most relevant prior art documents regarding the claimed subject matter. The search results in an international search report (ISR), together with a written opinion regarding patentability. (Note: The written opinion is established by the International Searching Authority (ISA) for international applications filed on or after 1 January 2004 only.) The ISA(s) that the applicant can choose depends on the receiving Office with which the applicant filed the international application. In 2013, the most selected ISAs were the European Patent Office (EPO) (with 37.7% of all ISRs issued), followed by the Japan Patent Office (JPO) (20.7%) and the Korean Intellectual Property Office (KIPO) (14.8%).

The ISA must establish the ISR and its accompanying written within "three months from the receipt of the search copy by the International Searching Authority, or nine months from the priority date, whichever time limit expires later."

The ISR is published together with the PCT application (or as soon as possible afterwards). The written opinion is initially confidential, but unless it is superseded by an International Preliminary Examination Report (see optional examination, below), it is made available in the form of an International Preliminary Report on Patentability (Chapter I of the Patent Cooperation Treaty, or IPRP Chapter I), within 30 months of the filing date or a priority date, if any. If the ISR is not in English, it is translated into English for publication. A designated Office may require a translation of the IPRP Chapter I into English.

The international search report can help the applicant decide whether it would be worthwhile seeking national protection, and if so, in how many countries, as fees and other expenses, including translation costs, must be paid to enter the national phase in each country. Yet another advantage of filing a PCT application under the PCT is that many national patent authorities will rely on the international search report (although the PCT does not obligate them to do so) instead of performing a prior art search themselves, and the applicant may thus be able to save search fees.

In addition to the compulsory international search, at least one optional supplementary international search may also be carried out by participating International Searching Authorities, (Note: Namely, an International Searching Authority which is competent to do so under Rule 45bis.9 PCT.) upon request by the applicant and payment of corresponding fees. The purpose is to reduce the likelihood of seeing new prior art being cited in the subsequent national phases. A supplementary international search is said to allow applicants to obtain an additional search report "taking into account the growing linguistic diversity of the prior art being found". In 2009 and 2010, the demand for supplementary international searches was relatively low.

=== Publication ===
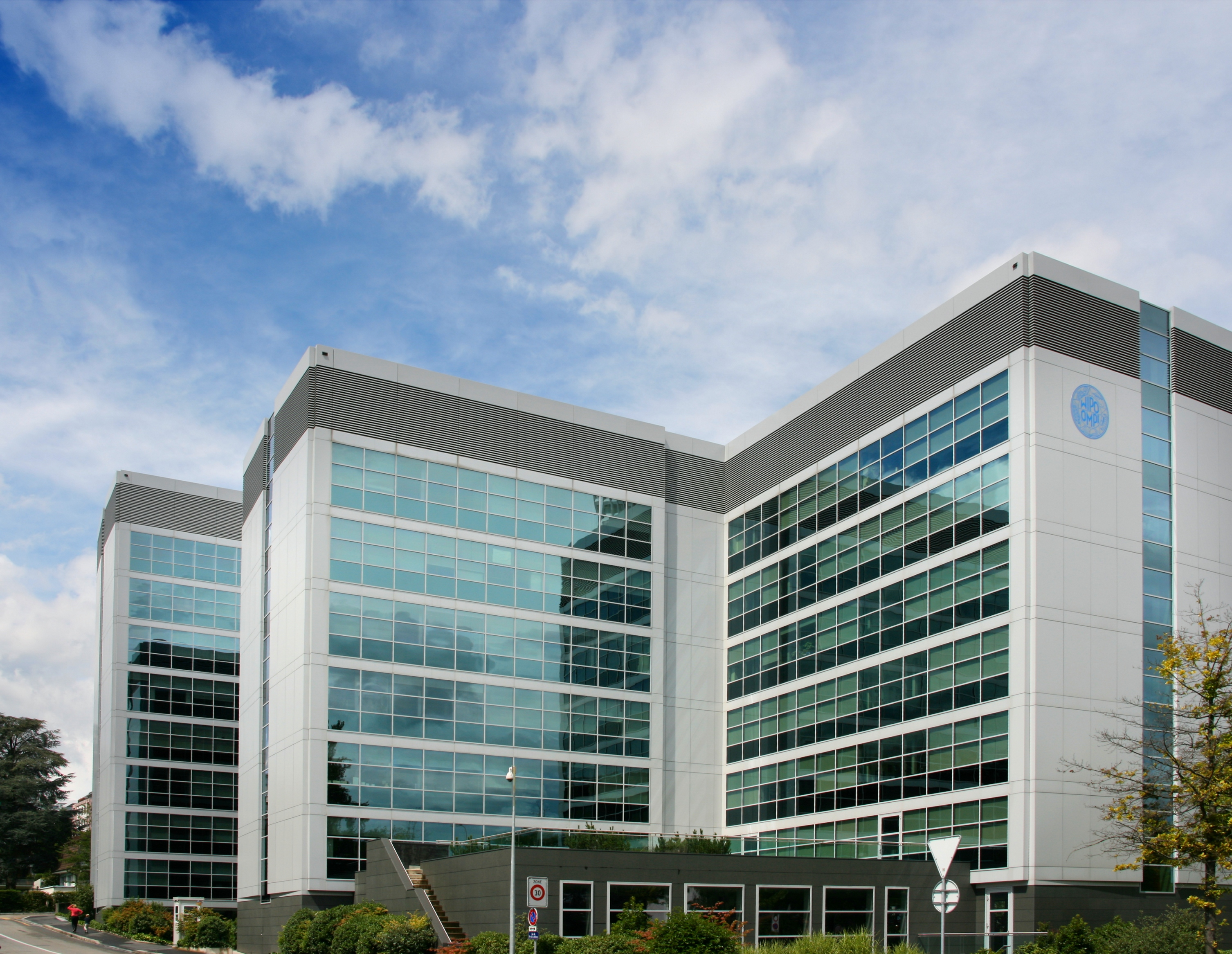
PCT building of WIPO in Geneva

The PCT application is published by the International Bureau at the WIPO, based in Geneva, Switzerland, in one of the ten "languages of publication": Arabic, Chinese, English, French, German, Japanese, Korean, Portuguese, Russian, and Spanish. The publication normally takes place promptly after 18 months from the filing date or, if a priority is claimed, from the earliest priority date. There are two exceptions to this rule, however. First, a PCT application may be published earlier if the applicant requests early publication. Secondly, if 18 months after the priority date, the PCT application designates only the United States, then the application is not automatically published.

From the publication of the PCT application until 28 months after the priority date, any third party may file observations regarding the novelty and inventive step of the invention. The observations may be submitted anonymously, and no fee is due for filing such observations.

An international application may also be withdrawn to prevent its publication. To do so, the International Bureau (IB) "must receive the notice of withdrawal of the application before the corresponding technical preparations for publication are completed".

=== Optional examination ===
An international preliminary examination may optionally be requested ("demanded"). The international preliminary examination is conducted by an authorized International Preliminary Examination Authority (IPEA) and its objective is "to formulate a preliminary and non-binding opinion on the questions whether the claimed invention appears to be novel, to involve an inventive step (to be non-obvious), and to be industrially applicable". This results in an International Preliminary Examination Report (IPER). Since 2004, the IPER bears the title "international preliminary report on patentability (Chapter II of the Patent Cooperation Treaty)" (commonly abbreviated "IPRP Chapter II"). The filing of a demand for international preliminary examination, which must be done within a time limit, is subject to the payment of a "handling fee" for the benefit of the International Bureau and a "preliminary examination fee" for the benefit of the IPEA. The cost of filing a demand varies depending on the IPEA used by the applicant. The IPEA(s) that the applicant can choose however depends on the receiving Office with which the applicant filed the PCT application (the same applies to ISAs).

If the written opinion established by the International Searching Authority (ISA) is positive, "there is little value to be obtained from filing a demand". However, "[for] cases where the written opinion of the ISA contains negative findings, the savings in the applicant's/agent's time and, where applicable, agent's fees, required by multiple responses to national offices may well justify the use of the Chapter II procedure." The demand for an international preliminary examination also gives the applicant an opportunity to amend the claims, description and drawings. Otherwise, the applicant can only modify the claims once within two months from the time of the ISR has been transmitted. There are many advantages, such as cost and effort savings ("as well as possibly shortened pendency/faster grants"), in receiving a favourable IPRP Chapter II, i.e. a favourable report following an international preliminary examination. For instance, national offices "with a smaller examining staff and those without examiners tend to rely more heavily on the results in the IPRP Chapter II".

When an international preliminary examination is demanded, the contracting states for which the examination is demanded are called elected Offices (under Chapter II), otherwise they are called designated Offices (under Chapter I). The election of a contracting state correspondingly means electing it when demanding (requesting) the examination.

An alternative to the filing of a demand for international preliminary examination is to file informal comments in response to the written opinion established by the ISA. These informal comments are not published. The informal comments should be submitted to the International Bureau (IB), and not to the ISA or the IPEA. They are kept in the file of the PCT application and, in the case where no demand is filed, forwarded to the designated offices, which are free to require a translation of the informal comments.

=== Substantive conditions of patentability ===
The PCT does not make any specific provision concerning the types of invention which may be the subject of an international application. Rules 39 and 67 permit International Searching and Preliminary Examining Authorities not to carry out search and examination on certain types of subject matter, such as scientific and mathematical theories, methods of doing business and computer programs to the extent that the Authority is not equipped to carry out a search or international preliminary examination concerning such programs. However, this does not affect the issue of whether the invention is patentable under the laws of the contracting states, as "[n]othing in [the PCT] and the Regulations is intended to be construed as prescribing anything that would limit the freedom of each contracting state to prescribe such substantive conditions of patentability as it desires."

=== National and regional phases ===
Finally, at 30 months (Note: The 30-month time limit to enter the national phase is not applicable to all countries. A small number of countries still request the entering of the national phase under Chapter I (i.e., if the preliminary examination is not demanded or not demanded in time) at 20 months. Consult this chart for national phase entry deadlines for specific countries or regions.) from the filing date of the PCT application or from the earliest priority date of the application if a priority is claimed, the international phase ends and the PCT application enters in national and regional phase. However, any national law may fix time limits which expire later than 30 months. For instance, it is possible to enter the European regional phase at 31 months from the earliest priority date. National and regional phases can also be started earlier on the express request of the applicant, even before publication of the international application.

If the entry into national or regional phase is not performed within the prescribed time limit, the PCT application generally ceases to have the effect of a national or regional application.

Upon entry into national phase in some PCT Contracting States, a utility model (or another other form of protection similar to a utility model, such as an inventor’s certificate) may be sought instead of a patent.

== Statistics ==
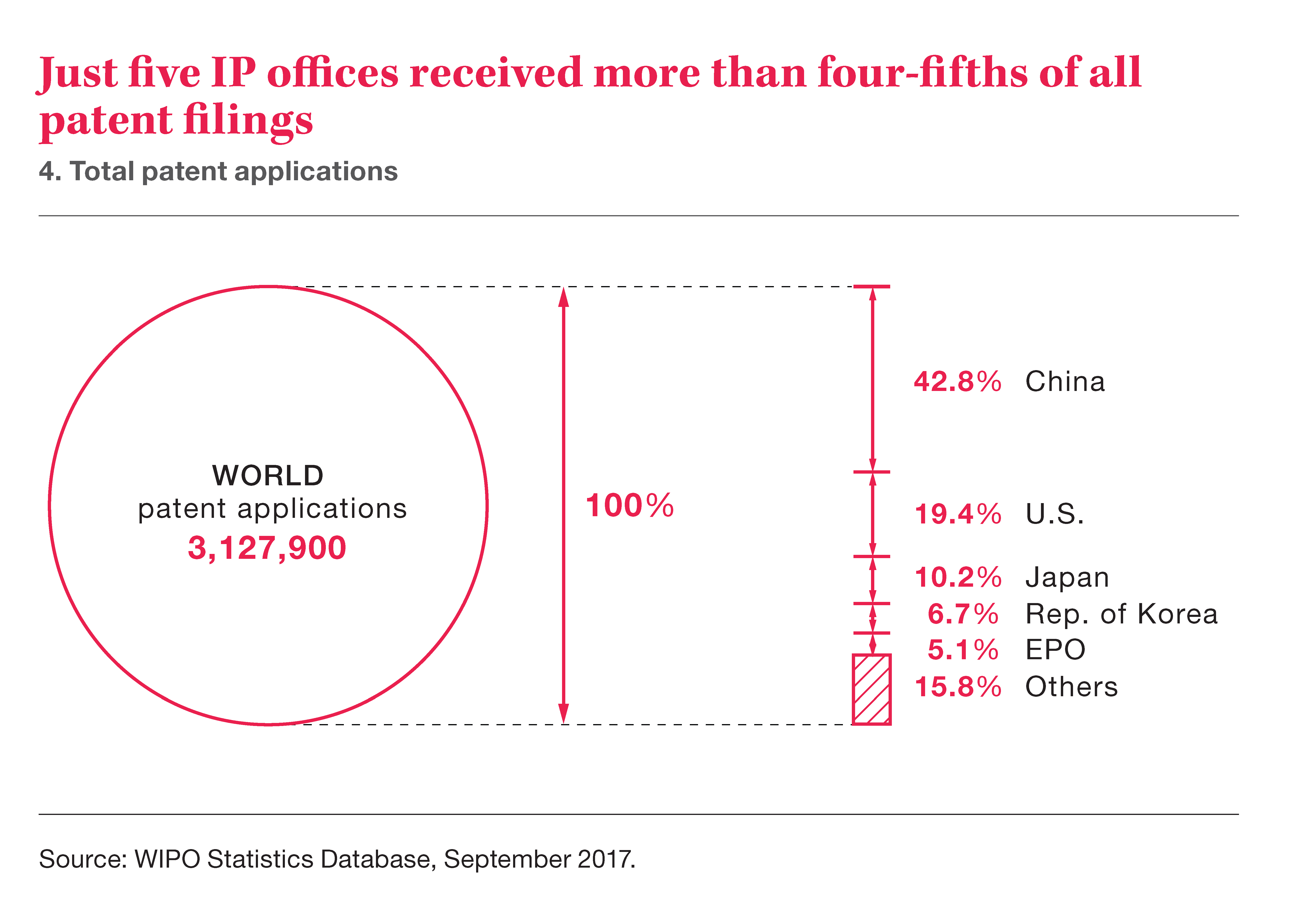
Total number of patent applications in 2017

The millionth PCT application was filed at the end of 2004, whereas the two millionth application was filed in 2011. The first ever decline in the number of filed PCT applications in over 30 years occurred in 2009, with a 4.5 percent drop compared to 2008. In 2013, about 205,000 international applications were filed, making 2013 the first year during which more than 200,000 PCT applications were filed in one year. The 3 millionth PCT application was published on 2 February 2017, and the 5 millionth PCT application was published in 2024.

Applications in 2018 were filed by users from 127 countries. The United States of America continued to be the largest source of applications, followed by China, Japan, Germany, and the Republic of Korea. Applications from China have grown at the fastest rate, rising to 21.1% of all applications in 2018. The top individual filer of applications in 2018 was Huawei Technologies Co. Ltd., which filed 5,405 applications, followed by Mitsubishi Electric with 2,812 applications, Intel with 2,499 applications, Qualcomm with 2,404 applications, and ZTE with 2,080 applications. Countries located in Asia were the source of 50.5% of all PCT applications in 2018. Applicants in Europe (24.5%) and North America (23.1%) were the other major sources of filings. The combined share for Africa, Latin America and the Caribbean (LAC) and Oceania amounted to 1.7% of total PCT filings.

In 2019, China surpassed the United States to become the largest user of the PCT.

The World Intellectual Property Organization provides statistics on the PCT System in the PCT Yearly Review, the World Intellectual Property Indicators and the IP Statistics Data Center.

== See also ==
- Eurasian Patent Organization (EAPO)
- Patent Law Treaty (PLT)
- Substantive Patent Law Treaty (SPLT)
- Treaty on Intellectual Property, Genetic Resources and Associated Traditional Knowledge (GRATK)
