= INID =

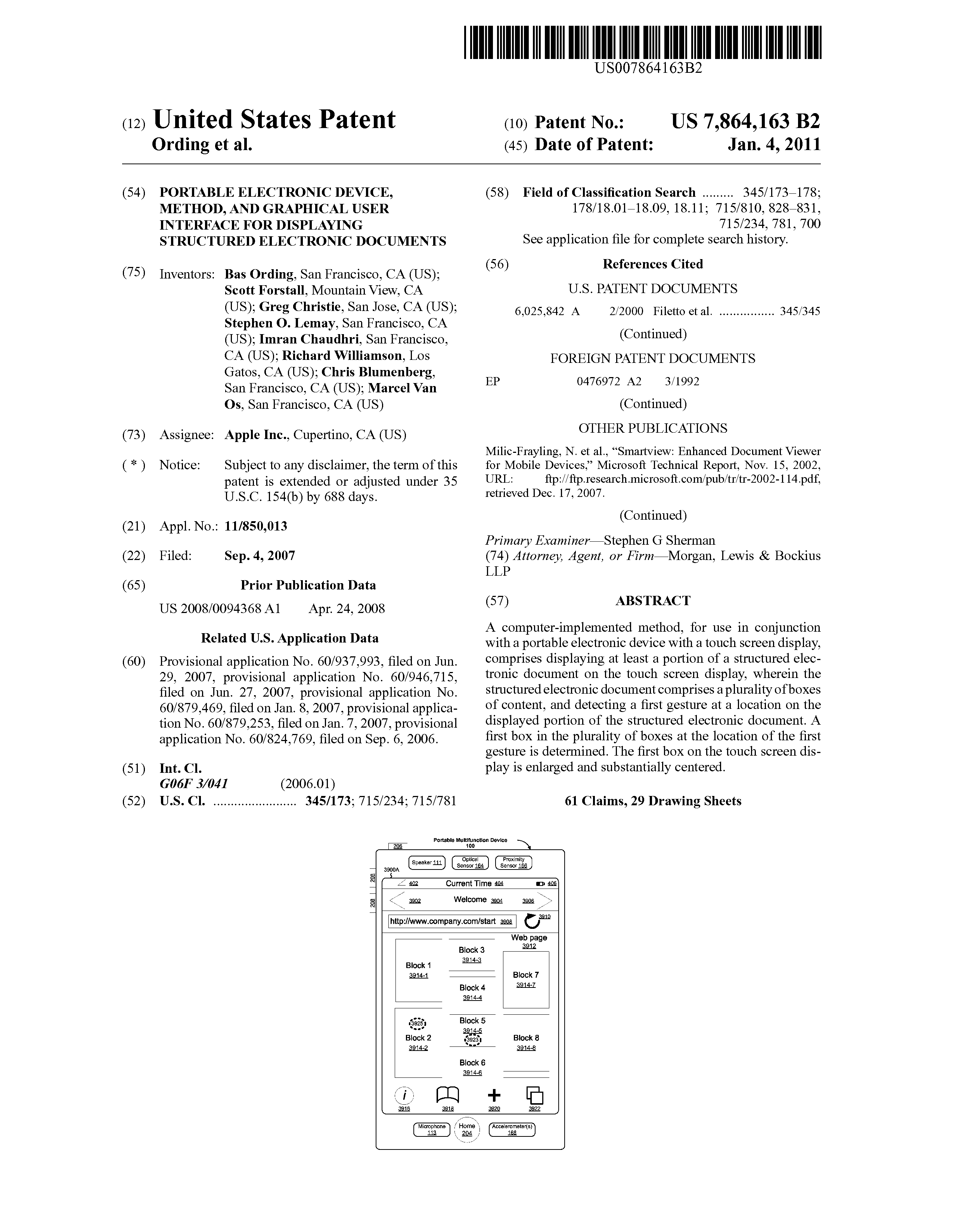
Sample patent to illustrate "INID" numbers. The INID numbers are those within brackets, such as "(10)" before the patent number.

INID is an acronym for Internationally agreed Numbers for the Identification of (bibliographic) Data. INID codes are used by patent offices worldwide for indicating specific bibliographic data items on the title pages of patents and patent application publications. INID codes use Arabic numerals, and so are language-independent. For example, number (30) indicates priority data, and (51) technical area according to the International Patent Classification (IPC).

INID codes are standardised by World Intellectual Property Organization (WIPO) in ST.9.
