= Kokai =

Term in Japanese patent law

A kōkai (公開), short for kōkai tokkyo kōhō (公開特許公報), is a published, unexamined Japanese patent application, in contrast to the kokoku or tokkyo kōhō, the examined and approved Japanese patent application. Kōkai means "open to the public", or "laid-open". Kōkai are published eighteen months after the earliest priority date.

Tokukai (特開) is another shorthand for kōkai tokkyo kōhō, taken from the first character of tokkyo (patent) and the second of kōkai.

== See also ==
- Japanese patent law
