= International Association for Technology Trade =

Economic consortium focused on information technology in China and emerging markets

IATT
- Company type: Consortium
- Industry: Technology Trade; Emerging Markets
- Founded: November 2004
- Headquarters: Headquarters - California, USA; Key Affiliates - EU, Asia; Key Markets - China, Mexico, Brazil, South Africa, India, Pakistan
- Key people: David McKnight, president Christine Shaw, executive director Leslee Xu, software council chair Fanny Hwang, director asia-pac
- Products: Trade Missions, Conferences, Symposia, Strategic Services
- Website: IATT - TechnologyTrade.org; IATT UK Mirror; IATT China Mirror; IATT EU Mirror; IATT India Mirror

The International Association for Technology Trade (IATT) is a consortium of information technology organizations, strategic advisors, government agencies and corporate members seeking to generate successful global business opportunities – with a key focus on China and emerging economies.

== Events ==
=== 2006 Guangdong Province Educational Technology Buyers' Summit ===
In June 2006, IATT hosted a high-level delegation from the Guangdong Province Department of Education, visiting North America at summit meetings arranged by IATT in Toronto, ON; Washington, DC and San Jose, CA. Highlights included meetings with representatives from Discovery Communications, the Oracle Education Foundation and Adobe Systems among other ISTE companies.

=== First Sino-American Forum of Intellectual Property Rights ===
Efforts in 2005 to forge a partnership with the Patent Protection Association of China (PPAC) under the direction of China’s State Intellectual Property Office (SIPO) resulted in the first-ever Sino-American Forum of Intellectual Property Rights, held in China’s booming Pearl River Delta. Attracting more than 500 government officials, business leaders and academics from throughout China and North America, IATT and PPAC co-organized the event.

=== 2005 China Educational Technology Conference & Expo ===
In 2005, IATT co-organized what was identified as the world's largest educational technology conference and expo in Dongguan, attracting nearly 40,000 attendees in its first year with leading EdTech speakers and a small number of non-China exhibitors from the US, Canada and UK.

== See also ==
- China–United States trade war (2018–present)
- Intellectual property in China
