= Patent office =

Government agency that issues patents

A patent office is a governmental or intergovernmental organization which controls the issue of patents. In other words, "patent offices are government bodies that may grant a patent or reject the patent application based on whether the application fulfils the requirements for patentability."

== List of patent offices ==
For a list of patent offices and their websites, see the World Intellectual Property Organization (WIPO) maintained list, here.

The entries shown in italics are regional or international patent offices.

- African Regional Intellectual Property Organization (ARIPO)
- Intellectual Property Agency of Armenia (AIPA)
- IP Australia (IPA)
- Barbados Corporate Affairs and Intellectual Property Office (CAIPO)
- Canadian Intellectual Property Office (CIPO)
- Chinese National Intellectual Property Administration (CNIPA)
- Ethiopian Intellectual Property Office (EIPO)
- European Patent Office (EPO)
- Eurasian Patent Organization (EAPO)
- German Patent Office (DPMA)
- Gulf Cooperation Council (GCC) Patent Office (GCCPO)
- Intellectual Property Office of Ireland (IPOI)
- Indian Patent Office (IPO)
- Intellectual Property Office of Singapore (IPOS)
- Israeli Patent Office
- Italian Patent and Trademark Office
- Japan Patent Office (JPO)
- Korean Intellectual Property Office (KIPO)
- Mexican Institute of Industrial Property (IMPI)
- National Industrial Property Institute, France (INPI)
- National Industrial Property Institute, Portugal (INPI)
- National Institute of Intellectual Property, Kazakhstan (NIIP)
- Netherlands Patent Office
- Nordic Patent Institute (NPI)
- Norwegian Industrial Property Office
- "Organisation Africaine de la Propriété Intellectuelle" (OAPI)
- Patent Office of the Republic of Latvia
- Intellectual Property Organisation of Pakistan (IPO)
- Intellectual Property Office of the Philippines (IPOPHL)
- Polish Patent Office (PPO)
- Russian Federal Service for Intellectual Property, (Rospatent), Russian Federation
- Spanish Patent and Trademark Office (SPTO)
- Swedish Patent and Registration Office (PRV)
- Swiss Federal Institute of Intellectual Property (IGE)
- Taiwan Intellectual Property Office (TIPO) Republic of China
- Turkish Patent and Trademark Office (TURKPATENT)
- Ukrainian National Office for Intellectual Property and Innovations (UNOIPI), formerly Ukrainian Institute of Intellectual Property
- United Kingdom Intellectual Property Office (UK-IPO)
- United States Patent and Trademark Office (USPTO)

== List of past patent offices or the like ==
- Confederate States Patent Office
- "Goskomizobretenie" (Soviet Union patent office)
- International Patent Institute

== See also ==
- Glossary of patent law terms
- Intellectual property organisation
- List of people associated with patent law
- Patent court
- World Intellectual Property Organization (WIPO)
