= Patent application =

Application filed at a patent office

A patent application is a request pending at a patent office for the grant of a patent for an invention described in the patent specification (Note: In the context of patent law, the specification, or patent specification, may either refer to the description of a patent or patent application, which is the meaning prevalent in the U.S., or to the complete patent as granted, which is meaning prevalent in Europe.) and a set of one or more claims stated in a formal document, including necessary official forms and related correspondence. It is the combination of the document and its processing within the administrative and legal framework of the patent office.

To obtain the grant of a patent, a person, either legal or natural, must file an application at a patent office with the jurisdiction to grant a patent in the geographic area over which coverage is required. This is often a national patent office, but may be a regional body, such as the European Patent Office. Once the patent specification complies with the laws of the office concerned, a patent may be granted for the invention described and claimed by the specification.

The process of "negotiating" or "arguing" with a patent office for the grant of a patent, and interaction with a patent office with regard to a patent after its grant, is known as patent prosecution. Patent prosecution is distinct from patent litigation which relates to legal proceedings for infringement of a patent after it is granted.

== Definition ==
The term patent application refers to the legal and administrative proceedings of requesting the issuance of a patent for an invention, as well as to the physical document and content of the description and claims of the invention, including its procedural paper work.

The first of those—the request for a legal privilege to which the applicant is entitled if the application is well founded—is temporal by its nature. It ceases to exist as soon as the application is withdrawn or refused, or a patent is granted. The informational content of the document as filed (or in other, prosaic words, the piece of paper), is a historical fact that persists and exists in perpetuity. (Note: Some of the early patents issued by the United States Patent and Trademark Office from July 1790 (when the first U.S. patent was issued) to July 1836 were lost by fire on December 15, 1836. The information content of at least some of these patent documents (if not recovered from somewhere else, e.g. through the inventors' records) do not exist in perpetuity. See X-patents.) The expression "application" is often employed without being conscious of its ambiguity. The expression is capable of misleading even experienced professionals.

== Geographic scope ==
Depending upon the office at which a patent application is filed, that application could either be an application for a patent in a given country, or may be an application for a patent in a range of countries. The former are known as "national (patent) applications", and the latter as "regional (patent) applications".

=== National applications ===
National applications are generally filed at a national patent office, such as the United Kingdom Patent Office, to obtain a patent in the country of that office. The application may either be filed directly at that office, or may result from a regional application or from an international application under the Patent Cooperation Treaty (PCT), once it enters the national phase.

=== Regional applications ===
A regional patent application is one which may have effect in a range of countries. The European Patent Office (EPO) is an example of a regional patent office. The EPO grants patents which can take effect in some or all countries contracting to the European Patent Convention (EPC), following a single application process. Other examples of regional patent offices are for example the Eurasian Patent Organization (EAPO), the African Intellectual Property Organization (OAPI) and the African Regional Intellectual Property Organization (ARIPO).

Filing and prosecuting an application at a regional granting office is advantageous as it allows patents in a number of countries to be obtained without having to prosecute applications in all of those countries. The cost and complexity of obtaining protection is therefore reduced.

=== International applications ===
The Patent Cooperation Treaty (PCT) is operated by World Intellectual Property Organization (WIPO) and provides a centralised application process, but patents are not granted under the treaty.

Exemplary PCT procedure, with a U.S. provisional application as a first filing

The PCT system enables an applicant to file a single patent application in a single language. The application, called an international application, can, at a later date, lead to the grant of a patent in any of the states contracting to the PCT. WIPO, or more precisely the International Bureau of WIPO, performs many of the formalities of a patent application in a centralised manner, therefore avoiding the need to repeat the steps in all countries in which a patent may ultimately be granted. The WIPO coordinates searches performed by any one of the International Searching Authorities (ISA), publishes the international applications and coordinates preliminary examination performed by any one of the International Preliminary Examination Authorities (IPEA). Steps such as naming inventors and applicants, and filing certified copies of priority documents can also be done centrally, and need not be repeated.

The main advantage of proceeding via the PCT route is that the option of obtaining patents in a wide range of countries is retained, while the cost of a large number of applications is deferred. In most countries, if a national application succeeds, damages can be claimed from the date of the international application's publication.

== Types ==
Patent offices may define a number of types of applications, each offering different benefits and being useful in different situations. Each office utilizes different names for the types of applications, but the general groups are detailed below. Within each group there are specific type of applications, such as patents for inventions (also called "utility patents" in the U.S.), plant patents, and design patents, each of which can have their own substantive and procedural rules.

=== Standard application ===
A standard patent application is a patent application containing all of the necessary parts (e.g. a written description of the invention and claims) that are required for the grant of a patent. A standard patent application may or may not result in the grant of a patent depending upon the outcome of an examination by the patent office it is filed in. In the U.S., a standard patent application is referred to as a "non-provisional" application.

=== Provisional application ===
Provisional patent applications can be filed with a small number of patent offices, particularly with the USPTO. In order for a US provisional application to establish a priority date for a future full (i.e. non-provisional) standard patent application, the disclosure in the provisional must be enabling. Claims are not required in a provisional application, although it is advised to have them, since claims may contribute to enabling disclosure.

The disclosure in a provisional application may, within a limited time (one year in the U.S.), be incorporated into a standard patent application, if a patent is to be pursued. Otherwise, the provisional application expires, does not get published, and does not become a prior art to other patent applications. No enforceable rights can be obtained solely through the filing of a provisional application. Full (non-provisional) application may have additional information added (i.e. experimental data), and for the purposed of prior art analysis (such as novelty and non-obviousness), the non-provisional application will have two priority dates.

=== Continuation application ===
In certain offices a patent application can be filed as a continuation of a previous application. Such an application is a convenient method of including material from a previous application in a new application when the priority year has expired and further refinement is needed. Various types of continuation application are possible, such as continuation and continuation-in-part.

=== Divisional application ===
A divisional patent application is one which has been "divided" from an existing application. A divisional application can only contain subject matter in the application from which it is divided (its parent), and retains the filing and priority date of the parent. Divisional applications are useful if a unity of invention objection is issued, in which case further inventions can be protected in divisional applications.

== Preparation, filing, and prosecution ==
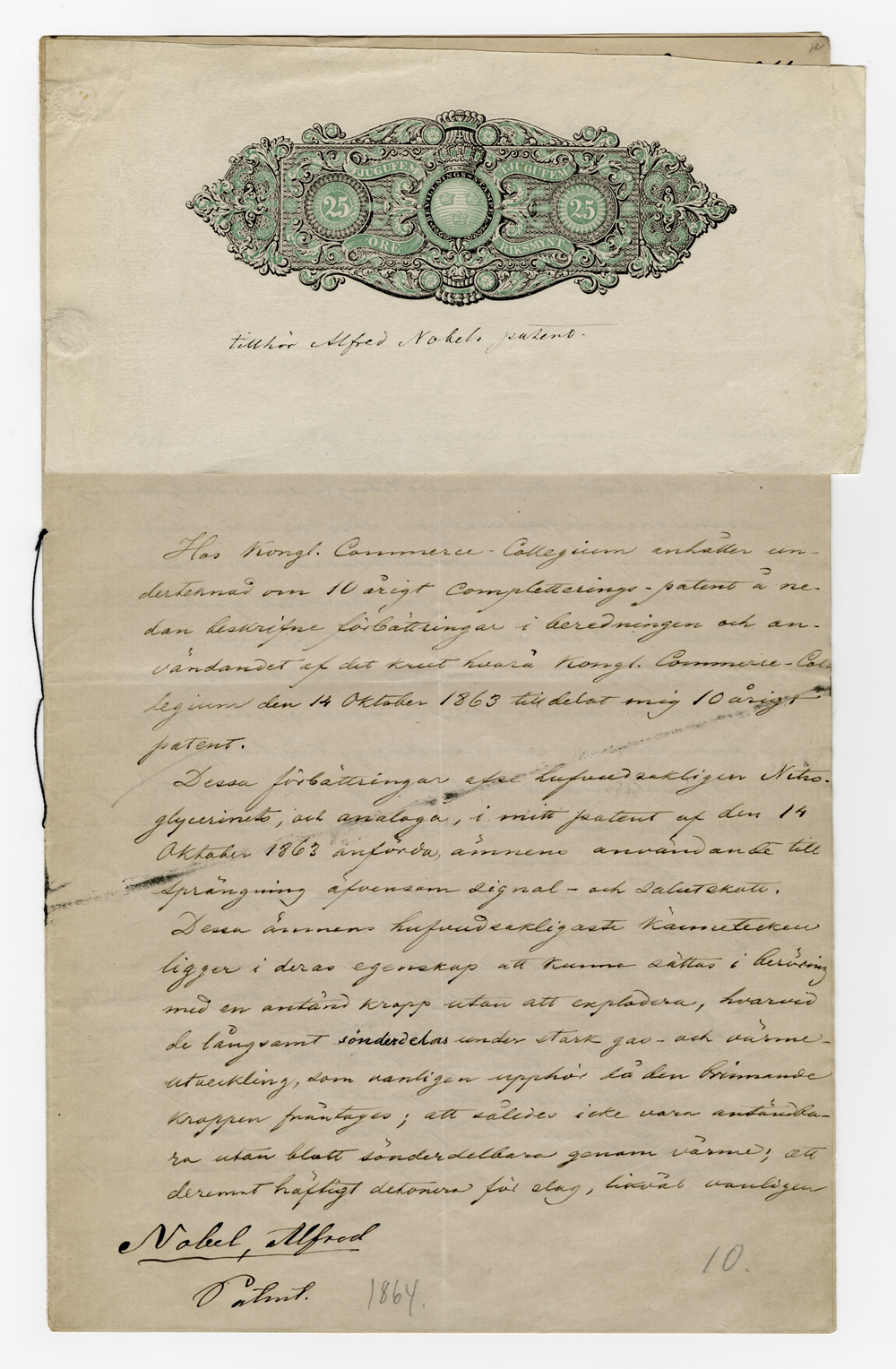
Swedish patent application from 1864; Alfred Nobel requests patent for the discoveries that would lead to dynamite.

The process of obtaining the grant of a patent begins with the preparation of a specification describing the invention. That specification is filed at a patent office for examination and ultimately a patent for the invention described in the application is either granted or refused.

=== Patent specification ===
A patent specification is a document describing the invention for which a patent is sought and setting out the scope of the protection of the patent. As such, a specification generally contains a section detailing the background and overview of the invention, a description of the invention and embodiments of the invention and claims, which set out the scope of the protection. A specification may include figures to aid the description of the invention, gene sequences and references to biological deposits, or computer code, depending upon the subject matter of the application. Most patent offices also require that the application includes an abstract which provides a summary of the invention to aid searching. A title must also generally be provided for the application.

Each patent office has rules relating to the form of the specification, defining such things as paper size, font, layout, section ordering and headings. Such requirements vary between offices.

Since a description cannot generally be modified once it is filed (with narrow exceptions), it is important to have it done correctly the first time.

The patent application generally contains a description of the invention and at least one claim purporting to define it. A patent application may also include drawings to illustrate the invention. In general, the drawings must be in black and white and be without colorings. Furthermore, an abstract is generally required.

For example, an international (PCT) application "must contain the following elements: request, description, claim or claims, one or more drawings (where drawings are necessary for the understanding of the invention), and abstract." Rule 5 PCT specifies what the description of an international application should contain in more details.

As another example, a European patent application consists of "a request for the grant of a European patent, a description of the invention, one or more claims, any drawings referred to in the description or claims, and an abstract." Rule 42 EPC specifies what the description of a European patent application should contain in more details.

=== Claims ===
The claims of a patent specification define the scope of protection granted by the patent. The claims describe the invention in a specific legal style, setting out the essential features of the invention in a manner to clearly define what would infringe the patent. Claims are often amended during prosecution to narrow or expand their scope.

The claims may contain one or more hierarchical sets of claims, each having one or more main, independent claim setting out the broadest protection, and a number of dependent claims which narrow that protection by defining more specific features of the invention.

In the U.S., claims can be amended after a patent is granted, but their scope cannot be broadened beyond what was originally disclosed in the specification. No claim broadening is allowed more than two years after the patent issues.

=== Filing date ===
The filing date of an application sets a cutoff date after which any public disclosures cannot form prior art (but the priority date must also be considered), and also because, in most jurisdictions, the right to a patent for an invention lies with the first person to file an application for protection of that invention (See: first to file and first to invent). It is therefore generally beneficial to file an application as soon as possible.

To obtain a filing date, the documents filed must comply with the regulations of the patent office in which it was filed. A full specification complying with all rules may not be required to obtain a filing date. For example, in the U.K., claims and an abstract are not required to obtain a filing date, but can be added later. However, since no subject matter can be added to an application after the filing date, it is important that an application disclose all material relevant to the application at the time of filing. If the requirements for the award of a filing date are not met, the patent office notifies the applicant of the deficiencies. Depending upon the law of the patent office in question, correction may be possible without moving the filing date, or the application may be awarded a filing date adjusted to the date on which the requirements are completed. A filed application generally receives an application number.

For countries that have acceded to the Patent Law Treaty (PLT), the PLT requires that the office of any Contracting Party must accord a filing date to an application upon compliance with three simple formal requirements: first, an indication that the elements received by the office are intended to be an application for a patent for an invention; second, indications that would allow the office to identify or to contact the applicant (however, a Contracting Party is allowed to require indications on both); third, a part which appears to be a description of the invention. No additional elements can be required for according a filing date. In particular, a Contracting Party cannot include one or more claims or a filing fee in a filing date requirement. As mentioned above, these requirements are not maximum requirements but constitute absolute requirements, so that a Contracting Party would not be allowed to accord a filing date unless all those requirements are complied with.

=== Priority claim ===
A patent application may claim priority from one or more previously filed applications to take advantage of the filing date of these earlier applications (in respect of the information contained in these earlier applications). Claiming priority is desirable because the earlier effective filing date reduces the number of prior art disclosures, increasing the likelihood of obtaining a patent.

The priority system is useful in filing patent applications in many countries, as the cost of the filings can be delayed by up to a year, without any of the applications made earlier for the same invention counting against later applications.

The rules relating to priority claims are in accordance with the Paris Convention for the Protection of Industrial Property, and countries which provide a priority system in conformity with the Paris Convention are said to be convention countries. These rules should not be confused with the rules under the Patent Cooperation Treaty (PCT), outlined above.

=== Security issues ===
Many national patent offices require that security clearance is given prior to the filing of a patent application in foreign countries. Such clearance is intended to protect national security by preventing the spread and publication of technologies related to (amongst others) warfare or nuclear arms.

The rules vary between patent offices, but in general all applications filed are reviewed and if they contain any relevant material, a secrecy order may be imposed. That order may prevent the publication of the application, and/or the foreign filing of patents relating to the invention.

Should it be desired to file an application in a country other than an inventor's country of residence, it may be necessary to obtain a foreign filing licence from the inventor's national patent office to permit filing abroad. Some offices, such as the USPTO, may grant an automatic license after a specified time (e.g., 6 months), if a secrecy order is not issued in that time.

=== Publication ===
Patent applications are generally published 18 months after the earliest priority date of the application. Prior to that publication the application is confidential to the patent office. After publication, depending upon local rules, certain parts of the application file may remain confidential, but it is common for all communications between an Applicant (or his agent) and the patent office to be publicly available.

The publication of a patent application marks the date at which it is publicly available and therefore at which it forms full prior art for other patent applications worldwide.

=== Patent pending ===
The expression patent pending is a warning that an alleged invention is the subject of a patent application. The term may be used to mark products containing the invention to alert a third party to the fact that the third party may be infringing a patent if the product is copied after the patent is granted. The rules on the use of the term to mark products vary among patent offices, as do the benefits of such marking. In general, it is permissible to apply the term patent pending to a product if there is, in fact, a patent pending for any invention implemented in the product.

=== Patentable subject matter ===
Patents are granted for the protection of an invention, but while an invention may occur in any field, patent laws have restrictions on the areas in which patents can be granted. Such restrictions are known as exclusions from patentability.

The scope of patentable subject is significantly larger in the U.S. than in Europe. For example, in Europe, things such as computer software or methods of performing mental acts are not patentable. The subject of what should be patentable is highly contentious, particularly as to software and business methods.

=== Search and examination ===
After filing, either systematically or, in some jurisdictions, upon request, a search is carried out for the patent application. The purpose of the search is to reveal prior art which may be relevant to the patentability of the alleged invention (that is, relevant to what is claimed, the "claimed subject-matter"). The search report is published, generally with the application 18 months after the priority date of the application, and as such is a public document. The search report is useful to the applicant to determine whether the application should be pursued or if there is prior art which prevents the grant of a useful patent, in which case the application may be abandoned before the applicant incurs further expense. The search report is also useful for the public and the competitors, so that they may have an idea of the scope of protection which may be granted to the pending patent application.

In some jurisdictions, including the U.S., a separate search is not conducted, but rather search and examination are combined. In such case, a separate search report is not issued, and it is not until the application is examined that the applicant is informed of prior art which the patent office examiner considers relevant.

Examination is the process of ensuring that an application complies with the requirements of the relevant patent laws. Examination is generally an iterative process, whereby the patent office notifies the applicant of its objection (see Office action). The applicant may respond with an argument or an amendment to overcome the objection. The amendment and the argument may then be accepted or rejected, triggering further response, and so forth, until a patent is issued or the application is abandoned or refused. Because patent application examination may be a lengthy process, many patent offices including United States Patent and Trademark Office (USPTO) and other national patent offices have introduced several programs of prioritized examination. These programs targeted specific domains or small firms. Post-program studies have found that small firms (less than 500 employees) are almost 4 times more likely than large firms to apply for accelerated examination the prioritized patenting, moreover patents examined through the Track One Program at USPTO were up to 44% more likely to be cited.

=== Issue or grant ===
Once the patent application complies with the requirements of the relevant patent office, a patent is granted further official fees, and in some regional patent systems, such as the European patent system, validating the patent requires that the applicant provide translations of the application in the official languages of states in which they desire protection.

The date of issue effectively terminates prosecution of a specific application, after which continuing applications cannot be filed, and establishes the date upon which infringement may be charged. Furthermore, an issue date for an application in the U.S. filed prior to 1995 also factors into the term of the patent, whereas the term of later filings is determined solely by the filing date.

=== Post-issue or grant ===
Many jurisdictions require periodic payment of maintenance fees to retain the validity of a patent after it is issued and during its term. Failure to timely pay the fees results in loss of the patent's protection.

The validity of an issued patent may also be subject to post-issue challenges of various types, some of which may cause the patent office to re-examine the application.

=== Patentees ===
The person to whom a patent is granted is known as the patentee, the owner of the patent, the patent proprietor, or the patent holder. Once a patent has been granted with respect to a particular country, anyone who wishes to exploit the invention commercially in that country must obtain the patentee's authorization. In principle, anyone who exploits a patented invention without the patentee's authorization commits an illegal act. Protection is granted for a limited period, generally 20 years. Once a patent expires, the protection ends, and the invention enters the public domain (also known as being "off patent"). The patentee no longer holds exclusive rights to the invention, which then becomes available for commercial exploitation by others.

== Rights conferred by a patent ==
The rights conferred by a patent are described in the patent law of the country in which the patent is granted. The patent owner's exclusive rights generally consist of the following:

- in the case of a product patent, the right to prevent third parties from making, using, offering for sale or selling the product, or importing it for these purposes, without the owner's consent; and
- in the case of a process patent, the right to prevent third parties from using the process without the owner's consent; and to prevent third parties from using, offering for sale or selling the products obtained directly by that process, or importing them for these purposes, without the owner's consent.

The patentee is not given a statutory right to exploit the invention, but rather a statutory right to prevent others from commercially exploiting it. Patentees may give permission, or grant a license, to other parties to use their inventions on mutually agreed terms. They may also sell their patent rights to someone else, who then becomes the new patent owner. There are certain exceptions to the principle that a patented invention cannot legally be exploited without the authorization of the patent owner. These exceptions take into account the balance between the legitimate interests of the patent holder and those of competitors, consumers and others. For example, many patent laws allow a patented invention to be exploited without the patentee's authorization: private acts for non-commercial purposes; acts for experimental purposes or scientific research; and acts for obtaining regulatory approval for pharmaceuticals. In addition, many laws provide for various situations under which compulsory licenses may be granted and government's use of patented inventions without the authorization of the patent owner may be allowed in the wider public interest.

== Trends in patents applications ==
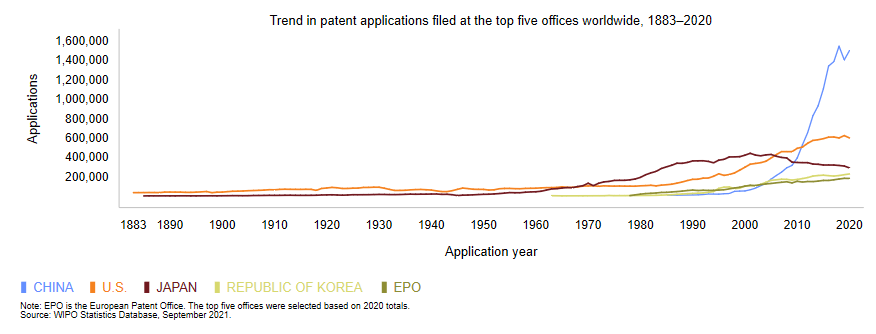
Trend in patent applications filed at the top five offices worldwide 1883–2020. Source WIPO.

=== Global trends ===
In 2020, 3.3 million patent applications were filed worldwide. This represents an increase of 1.6% on 2019.

Trend in patent applications worldwide 2006–2020
Year	Number of applications	Growth rate (%)
2006	1 791 700	5,2
2007	1 874 700	4,6
2008	1 930 000	2,9
2009	1 855 900	-3,8
2010	1 997 400	7,6
2011	2 158 200	8,1
2012	2 356 500	9,2
2013	2 556 000	8,5
2014	2 671 800	4,5
2015	2 878 200	7,7
2016	3 116 900	8,3
2017	3 161 200	..
2018	3 325 500	5,2
2019	3 226 100	-3,0
2020	3 276 700	1,6

Note: World totals are WIPO estimates using data covering 161 patent offices. These totals include applications filed directly with national and regional offices and applications entering offices through the Patent Cooperation Treaty national phase (where applicable). China's pre-2017 data are not comparable due to a change in methodology. Due to this break in the data series, and to the high number of filings in China, it is not possible to report an accurate 2017 growth rate at world level.

=== Top PCT patent applicants ===
The Patent Cooperation Treaty (PCT) is an international patent law treaty, concluded in 1970. It provides a unified procedure for filing patent applications to protect inventions in each of its contracting states. A patent application filed under the PCT is called an international application, or PCT application.

Top PCT patent applicants 2019 - 2024
Applicants	Country	2020 PCT applications	2021 PCT applications	2022 PCT applications	2023 PCT applications	2024 PCT applications
Huawei	China	5464	6952	7689	6494	6600
Samsung Electronics	South Korea	3093	3041	4387	3924	4640
Qualcomm	U.S.	2173	3931	3855	3410	3848
LG Electronics	South Korea	2759	2885	1793	1887	2083
Contemporary Amperex Technology	China		271	266	1799	1993
BOE Technology	China	1892	1980	1884	1988	1959
Mitsubishi Electric	Japan	2810	2673	2320	2152	1956
Xiaomi	China			913	1603	1889
Ericsson	Sweden	1989	1878	2158	1863	1886
Nippon Telegraph and Telephone Communication	Japan		1508	1884	1760	1877
ZTE Corporation	China	1793	1493	1479	1738	1851
Panasonic	Japan	1611	1741	1776	1722	1718

=== Participation of women inventors in PCT applications ===
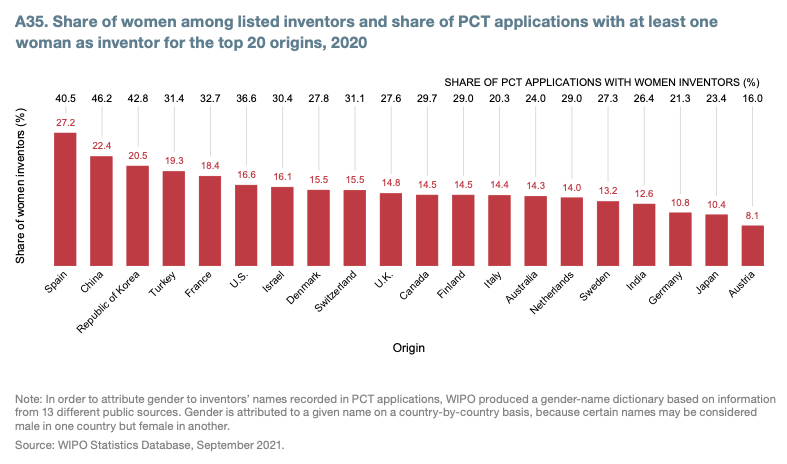
Share of women amongst listed inventors and share of PCT applications with at least one woman as inventor for the top 20 origins 2020

In 2020, women accounted for 16.5% of all inventors listed in Patent Cooperation Treaty applications and men the remaining 83.5%. The proportion of women inventors has increased from 11.3% in 2006 to 16.5% in 2020. Moreover, the proportion of women inventors has grown in every region of the world over the past decade. About 33.7% of PCT applications named at least one woman as inventor in 2020, and 95.9% named at least one man as inventor. The share of PCT applications with at least one woman as inventor has risen from 22% in 2006 to 33.7% in 2020, while the share for those with at least one man as inventor has decreased within the same period, from 97.3% down to 95.9%.

The gender gap among PCT inventors varies considerably across countries. Within the top 20 origins, Spain (27.2%), China (22.4%) and the Republic of Korea (20.5%) had the largest proportion of inventors who were women in 2020. Conversely, Germany (10.8%), Japan (10.4%) and Austria (8.1%) had the smallest.

Fields of technology related to the life sciences had comparatively high shares of PCT applications with women inventors in 2020. Women represented more than one-quarter of inventors listed in published PCT applications in the fields of biotechnology (29.5%), food chemistry (29.4%), pharmaceuticals (28.6%), analysis of biological materials (25.9%) and organic fine chemistry (25.2%).

== See also ==
- Backlog of unexamined patent applications
- INID codes
- Kokai
- Glossary of patent law terms
- List of patent offices
- Patent caveat, a type of provisional application used by the USPTO until 1909
- Patent model, a miniature model of an invention required by the USPTO until 1880
- Proof of concept
- United States Statutory Invention Registration
- Budapest Treaty on the International Recognition of the Deposit of Microorganisms for the Purposes of Patent Procedure

== Sources ==
This article incorporates text from a free content work. Licensed under CC-BY-4.0. Text taken from World Intellectual Property Indicators 2021, WIPO.
