= European Patent Office =

One of the two organs of the European Patent Organisation

- Abbreviation: EPO
- Predecessor: Institut International des Brevets
- Formation: 1977; 49 years ago
- Headquarters: Munich, Germany
- Official languages: English; French; German
- President: António Campinos
- Parent organisation: European Patent Organisation
- Budget: €2.357 billion (2020)
- Staff: 6,403 (Dec. 2020)
- Website: www.epo.org

The European Patent Office (EPO) (Note: The abbreviation "EPOff" has been also used to refer to the European Patent Office, in order to distinguish it from the European Patent Organisation, see European Patent Office web site, European Patent Convention (EPC), Alphabetical keyword index. Consulted 17 November 2007.) is one of the two organs of the European Patent Organisation (EPOrg), the other being the Administrative Council. The EPO acts as executive body for the organisation while the Administrative Council acts as its supervisory body as well as, to a limited extent, its legislative body. The actual legislative power to revise the European Patent Convention lies with the Contracting States themselves when meeting at a Conference of the Contracting States.

Within the European Patent Office, examiners are notably in charge of studying European patent applications, filed by applicants, to decide whether to grant a patent for an invention. The patents granted by the European Patent Office are called European patents.

== Function ==
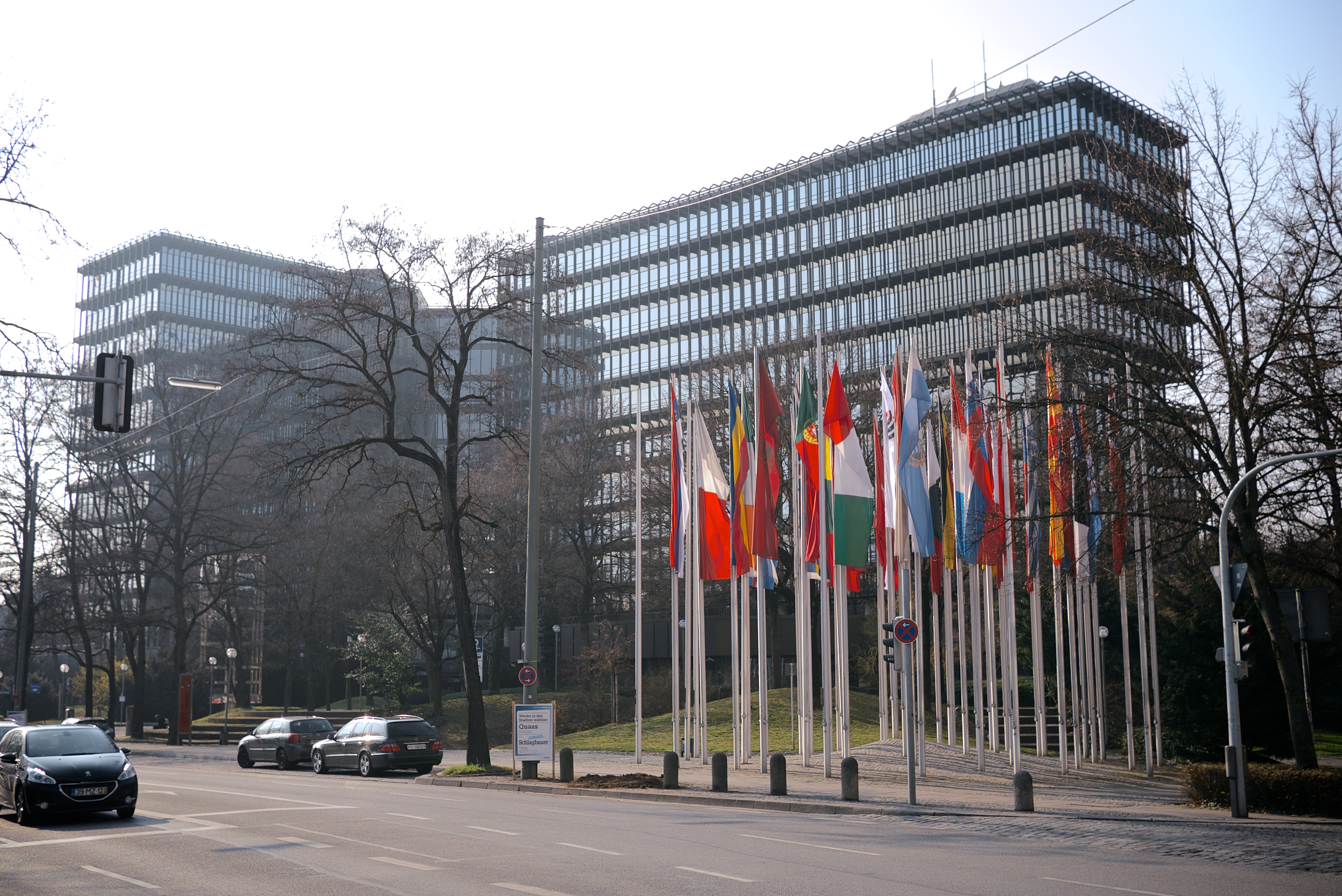
EPO headquarters in Munich, Germany

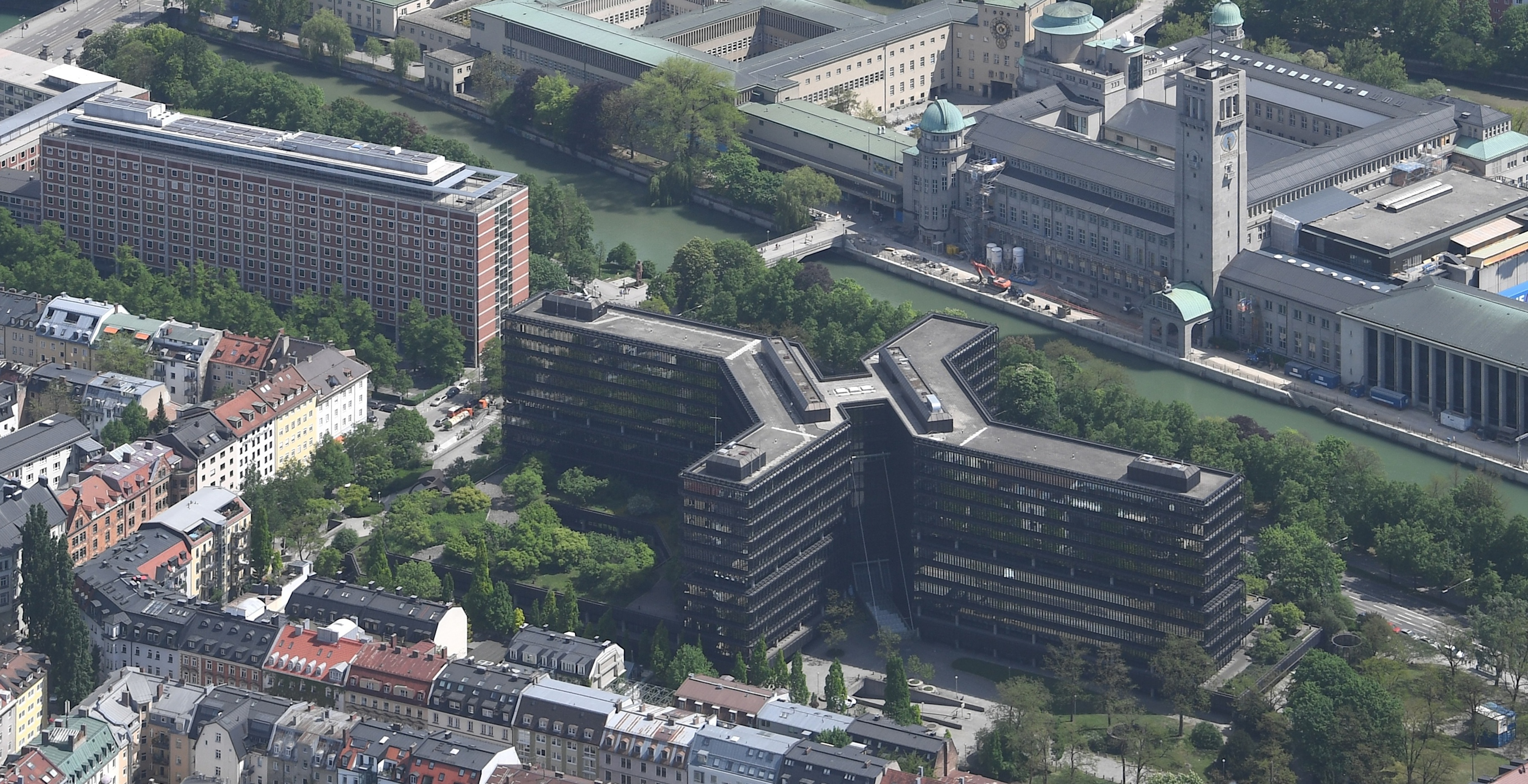
Aerial image of the headquarters in Munich (center), above it on the other side of the river Isar the science museum Deutsches Museum, to the left the German Patent and Trademark Office

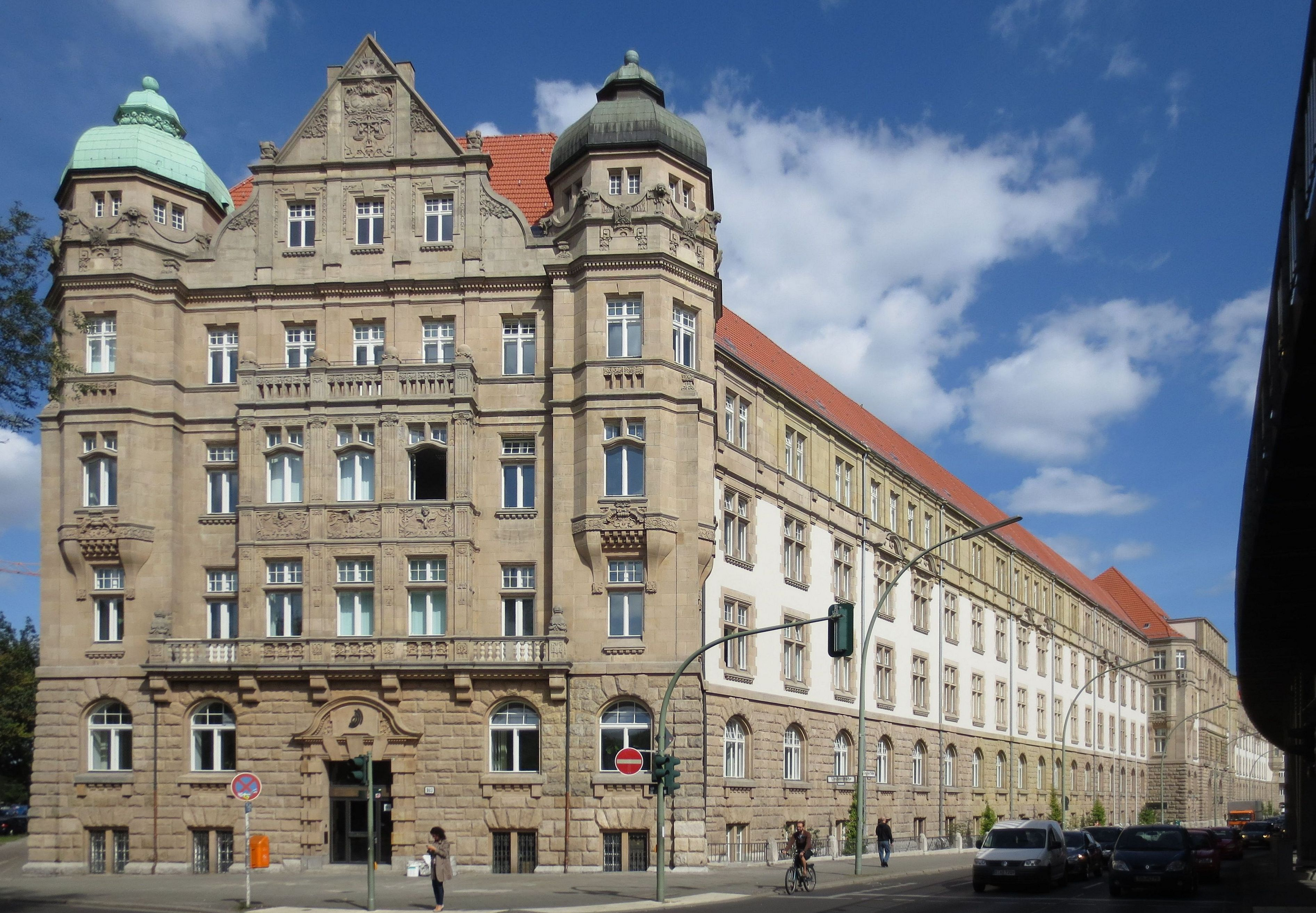
EPO sub-office in Berlin

The European Patent Office (EPO) grants European patents covering the Contracting States to the European Patent Convention and several other states that have concluded extension and validation agreements with the EPO. The EPO provides a single patent grant procedure, but not a single patent from the point of view of enforcement. Hence a patent granted by the EPO is not a single or unitary European Union patent or uniformly recognised Europe-wide patent, but a bundle of national patents. Patents granted by the EPO can, however, be challenged centrally at the EPO via opposition proceedings. Besides granting European patents, the EPO is also in charge of establishing patentability search reports for national patent applications on behalf of the patent offices of France, Netherlands, Belgium, Luxembourg, Italy, Turkey, Greece, Cyprus, Malta, San Marino, Lithuania, Latvia and Monaco.

=== Role in the unitary patent ===
Since the European patent with unitary effect (also called "unitary patent") entered into force on 1 June 2023, some administrative tasks relating thereto are performed by the EPO. Those tasks include the collection of renewal fees and registration of unitary effect upon grant, exclusive licenses and statements that licenses are available to any person. Decisions of the EPO regarding the unitary patent are open to appeal to the Unified Patent Court (UPC), rather than to the EPO Boards of Appeal.

== Legal status ==
The European Patent Office is not a legal entity as such, but an organ of the European Patent Organisation, which has a legal personality.

== Location and staff ==
The EPO headquarters are located in Munich, Germany. The EPO has also a branch in Rijswijk, Netherlands, near The Hague, sub-offices in Berlin, Germany, and Vienna, Austria, and an office for liaison with the EU institutions in Brussels, Belgium. At the end of 2019, the European Patent Office had a staff of 6 608 (with 3 675 based in Munich, 2 624 in Rijswijk, 227 in Berlin, 87 in Vienna and 3 in Brussels). The EPO comprised staff from 35 different nationalities, with 74% having a nationality different from that of the country they work in. In terms of gender diversity, 34% of all staff members were women. One quarter of managers were women, a slight increase on previous years. In 2019, the EPO spent over EUR 5 million on talent development activities, with 94% of staff receiving at least one training activity during the year.

The premises of the European Patent Office enjoy a form of extraterritoriality. In accordance with the Protocol on Privileges and Immunities, which forms an integral part of the European Patent Convention under Article 164(1) EPC, the premises of the European Patent Organisation, and therefore those of the European Patent Office, are inviolable. The authorities of the States in which the Organisation has its premises are not authorized to enter those premises, except with the consent of the president of the European Patent Office. Such consent is however "assumed in case of fire or other disaster requiring prompt protective action".

== Management ==
Presidents of the European Patent Office
1. Johannes Bob van Benthem (1 November 1977 – 30 April 1985), Dutch.
2. Paul Braendli (1 May 1985 – 31 December 1995), Swiss.
3. Ingo Kober (1 January 1996 – 30 June 2004), German.
4. Alain Pompidou (1 July 2004 – 30 June 2007), French.
5. Alison Brimelow (1 July 2007 – 30 June 2010), British.
6. Benoît Battistelli (1 July 2010 – 30 June 2018), French.
7. António Campinos (from 1 July 2018), Portuguese-French.

The European Patent Office is directed by a president, who is responsible for its activities to the Administrative Council. The president also represents the European Patent Organisation. The president has therefore a dual role: representative of the European Patent Organisation and head of the European Patent Office. The president of the European Patent Office is appointed by the Administrative Council. A majority of three-quarters of the votes of the Contracting States represented and voting in the Administrative Council is required for the appointment of the president.

The president is assisted by a collective body known as the Management Advisory Committee (MAC). Currently, the MAC comprises the president, three vice-presidents and several principal directors and directors. Each MAC member is responsible for a specific business area and reports to the president. The MAC is expected to implement initiatives in alignment with general policy and propose initiatives or policy changes that could impact the activities of the EPO.

More generally, the "management of the EPO is dominated by the delegates of the contracting States in the Administrative Council," these delegates being, according to Otto Bossung, primarily guided by their national interests rather than by supranational interests such as for instance the implementation of the EU internal market.

== Languages ==
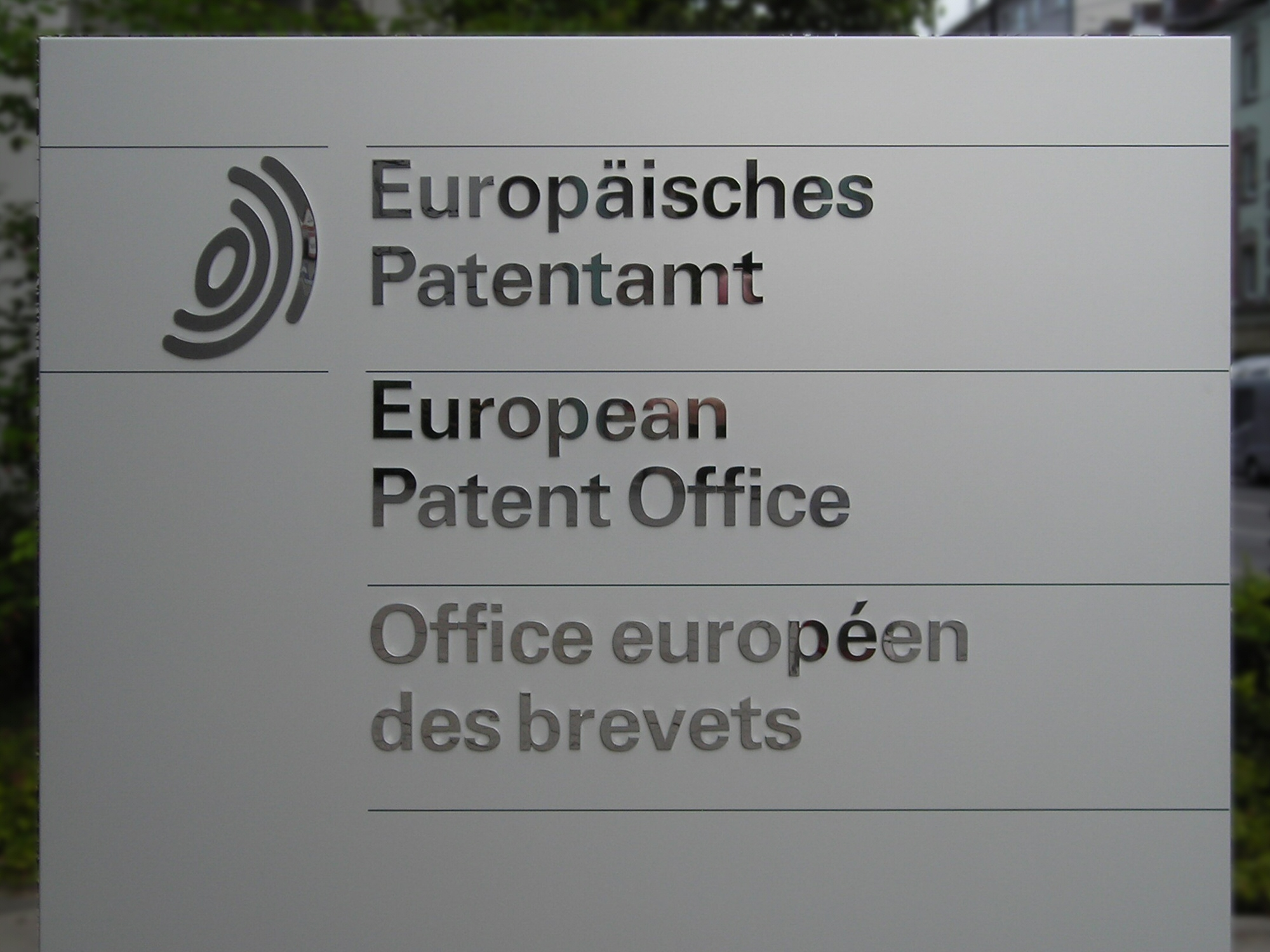
Signage at the Munich office of the European Patent Office, in its three official languages: German, English and French.

The three official languages of the European Patent Office are English, French and German, and publications, including the European Patent Bulletin and Official Journal of the European Patent Office, are published in all three of those languages.

European patent applications may be filed in any language provided that a translation into one of the official languages is submitted within two months if the language of filing is not an EPO official language. The official language in which the application is filed or into which it is translated is taken to be the language of the proceedings and the application is published in that language. Documentary evidence may also be submitted in any language, although the EPO may require a translation.

Some Contracting States to the European Patent Convention have an official language which is not an official language of the EPO, such as Dutch, Italian or Spanish. These languages are referred to as "admissible non-EPO languages". Residents or nationals of such States may submit any documents subject to a time limit in an official language of that State and there is a period of one month for filing a translation into an official language or the document is deemed not to have been filed. The filing fee and examination fee are reduced by 30% for certain categories of applicants, namely for small and medium-sized enterprises, natural persons, and "non-profit organisations, universities or public research organisations", when filing a patent application or an examination request in an admissible non-EPO language and subsequently, or at the earliest simultaneously, file the necessary translation.

== Departments and directorates-general ==
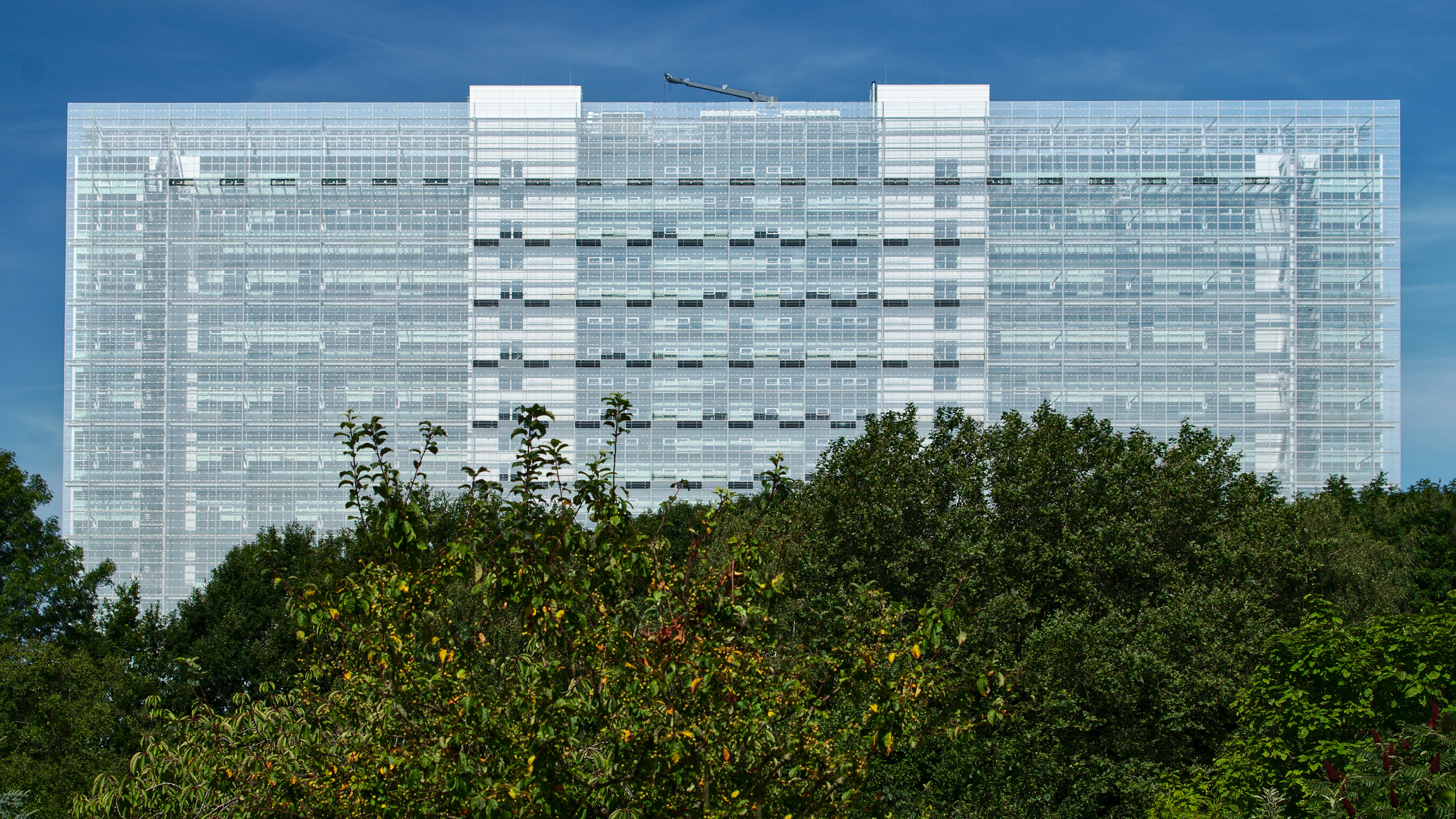
Branch of the EPO at The Hague, Netherlands (more precisely at Rijswijk, a suburb of The Hague)

The European Patent Office includes the following departments to carry out the procedures laid down in the EPC:

- a Receiving Section, responsible for the examination on filing and the examination as to formal requirements of European patent applications;
- Search Divisions, "responsible for drawing up European search reports";
- Examining Divisions, responsible for prior art searches and the examination of European patent applications;
- Opposition Divisions, responsible for the examination of oppositions against any European patent;
- a Legal Division, "responsible for decisions in respect of entries in the Register of European Patents and in respect of registration on, and deletion from, the list of professional representatives";
- Boards of Appeal, "responsible for the examination of appeals from decisions of the Receiving Section, the Examining Divisions and Opposition Divisions, and the Legal Division"; and
- an Enlarged Board of Appeal to notably ensure uniform application of patent law.

The above departments of European Patent Office are organized into three "Directorates-General" (DG), each being directed by a Vice-President, the DG Patent Granting Process, the DG Corporate Services, and the DG Legal and International Affairs, and a Boards of Appeal Unit, acting as the EPO's judiciary. According to Sir Robin Jacob, the members of the EPO Boards of Appeal are "judges in all but name".

The European Patent Office does not make decisions on infringement matters. National courts have jurisdiction over infringement matters regarding European patents. Regarding the validity of European patents however, both the European Patent Office during opposition proceedings (Article 99 EPC) and national courts during nullity proceedings (Article 138 EPC) may decide to revoke a European patent.

== Activities under the Patent Cooperation Treaty ==
In the international procedure according to the Patent Cooperation Treaty (PCT), the European Patent Office acts as a Receiving Office, an International Searching Authority (ISA), an International Preliminary Examining Authority (IPEA) and, with effect from 1 July 2010, as a so-called Supplementary International Searching Authority (SISA). The Patent Cooperation Treaty (PCT) provides an international procedure for handling patent applications, called international applications, during the first 30 months after their first filing in any country party to the PCT. The European Patent Office does not grant "international patents," as such patents do not exist. After 30 months (or, for a few countries, after 20 months) an international application must be converted into national or regional patent applications, and then are subject to national/regional grant procedures.

As Supplementary International Searching Authority (SISA), the European Patent Office has announced that it will conduct no more than 700 supplementary international searches per year.

== Online services ==
The EPO offers on its web site several free services, including Espacenet and Open Patent Services (OPS) for searching within its collection of patent documents, the legal texts published in its Official Journal, the European Patent Register containing legal information relating to published European patent applications and European patents (the European Patent Register also allowing the inspection of files under Article 128 EPC), and a publication server of the European patent applications and patents. There is also the CMS software for filing European patent applications online.

== International cooperation ==
The EPO engages in several forms of international co-operation within and outside of Europe, with other intellectual property offices, as well as with international organisations that are outside of the patent system. The EPO cooperates with the United States Patent and Trademark Office (USPTO) and the Japan Patent Office (JPO) as one of the Trilateral Patent Offices. It also works with the Japan Patent Office (JPO), the Korean Intellectual Property Office (KIPO), China's National Intellectual Property Administration (CNIPA) and the United States Patent and Trademark Office (USPTO) in a co-operation known as the "five IP offices" or IP5.

On 27 April 2017, the EPO and the Eurasian Patent Organization (EAPO) signed a program enabling increased work-sharing and accelerated treatment of patent applications between both patent offices. The agreement, known as the Patent Prosecution Highway (PPH), was signed by the presidents of the EPO and EAPO in Munich. The EAPO president Saule Tlevlessova stated, "The signing of this bilateral PPH agreement opens a new page in the history of EAPO-EPO co-operation, and will serve to benefit applicants and our offices."

Currently, the EPO offers three types of cooperation agreements with non-member states:

- Technical co-operation aims to align national or regional patent systems in emerging economies with the European patent system. It enables partners to access the EPO's tools or participate in pilot programmes such as the Patent Prosecution Highway (PPH) which offers a fast-track procedure.
- Reinforced partnerships build on technical co-operation and develop strategic ties in technical areas of mutual interest. Partner offices can avoid duplication of work through the re-use of EPO results.
- In the validation system, inventors and businesses filing for a European patent can extend the scope of protection to a validation state. This scheme enables long-term technical cooperation that can be customised according to partner requirements.

== Employees' representation and labour relations ==
The main staff union active within the EPO is the "Staff Union of the European Patent Office" (SUEPO).

As an international organization, EPO enjoys immunity and national courts have—in principle—no jurisdiction regarding disputes in which EPO is a party. Labour disputes can be submitted by employees to the Administrative Tribunal of the International Labour Organization (ILOAT). Courts in the Netherlands have however on occasion taken jurisdiction when it found a breach of fundamental principles of human rights, based on European Court of Human Rights case law. Jurisdiction was assumed for example because the ILOAT procedure (of over 3 years) was too lengthy for a process involving health issues or regarding a conflict with labour unions, as no appeal to ILOAT or any other judicial organization was possible. The background to the latter judgment was the ongoing conflict between EPO staff and management, in particular the refusal of EPO to recognise the staff unions, blocking of e-mail communication between the unions and their members and restriction of the right to strike. After service of the judgement to EPO, the then Dutch Minister of Security and Justice, Ivo Opstelten, ordered bailiffs not to perform service of the judgment. Opstelten's intervention was criticised by a number of Dutch legal experts including Cedric Ryngaert, Professor of International Law in Utrecht, who considered the Minister's intervention to be unusual: "Basically he erodes the power of the Court. International organisations are going to increasingly put themselves above the law, which is already a problem now. Opstelten relies on an Act from the seventies, which must be applied dynamically. Instead he takes a very conservative view."

Labour relations at the EPO during the presidency of Benoît Battistelli have been strained and marked by conflict with a noticeable escalation during 2014. Staff discontent has been attributed to Battistelli's style of management which, according to reports in the German newspapers Die Zeit and Die Welt, was perceived by staff as being unduly autocratic and unsuited to a European intergovernmental body such as the EPO.

Concern has been expressed regarding the high number of suicides of EPO employees, five in over three years. The EPO President Battistelli dismissed the suggestions -by EPO staff union SUEPO- of a possible link between the suicide and working conditions at the EPO as "totally inappropriate" and accused the staff union of "abusing a personal tragedy and inciting controversy". The EPO staff union SUEPO said that a direct link between the suicide and the working conditions had not been demonstrated but that the Dutch Labour Inspectorate should be given the opportunity of investigating the matter.

== Controversial investment fund ==
In June 2018, the German Federal Court of Auditors (German: Bundesrechnungshof) and financial experts criticized the planned establishment by the EPO of a fund, called "EPO Treasury Investment Fund" (EPOTIF), to manage 2.3 billion euros of its assets, the fund including risky financial products such as asset-backed securities, mortgage-backed securities, and credit default swaps.

== Quality of granted patents ==
At the end of the 2010s and into the 2020s, a decline in the quality of patents granted by the EPO was reported and criticised, as the decline in the quality of searches and examinations at the EPO is seen as harmful to the industry (more invalid European patents granted means more legal uncertainty in the market).
