= Eurasian Patent Organization =

International organization granting Eurasian patents

- Abbreviation: EAPO
- Formation: 12 August 1995; 31 years ago
- Headquarters: Moscow, Russia
- Members: 8
- Official languages: Russian
- President: Grigory Ivliev
- Website: www.eapo.org/en/

The Eurasian Patent Organization (EAPO) is an international organization set up in 1995 by the Eurasian Patent Convention (EAPC) to grant Eurasian patents. Since 2021 the organization has also been granting industrial design patents. The official language of the EAPO is Russian and as of October 2026 its current president is Grigory Ivliev. The headquarters of the EAPO is in Moscow, Russia.

== Membership and signatories ==
=== Member states ===
As of October 2026, the following 8 countries are contracting states to the EAPC and therefore members of the Eurasian Patent Organization:

- Armenia
- Azerbaijan
- Belarus
- Kazakhstan
- Kyrgyzstan
- Russia
- Tajikistan
- Turkmenistan

=== Former members ===
Moldova is a former member state of the Eurasian Patent Organization. On 26 October 2011, Moldova denounced the Eurasian Patent Convention, meaning that, since 26 April 2012, it is no longer party to the Convention. In December 2011, negotiations on a "validation and co-operation agreement" between the European Patent Office (EPO) and Moldova were authorized by the Administrative Council of the European Patent Organisation. The validation agreement with Moldova took effect on 1 November 2015. On 1 June 2026, Moldova became a member state of the European Patent Convention and European Patent Office.

Although Moldova left the Eurasian Patent Organization, the Intellectual Property Agency of Moldova signed a Cooperation Agreement between Moldova and the Eurasian Patent Office in 2017.

=== Signatories that did not become members ===
Although Ukraine and Georgia were original signatories to the Eurasian Patent Convention, they have not ratified it.

In 2019, negotiations between the European Patent Office (EPO) and Georgia were expected to result in a validation agreement, similar to the one existing between the EPO and Moldova.

== International cooperation ==
The EAPO cooperates with other patent organizations and has signed memorandums of understanding with the following:

- African Regional Intellectual Property Organization
- European Patent Office
- European Union Intellectual Property Office
- Korean Intellectual Property Office
- World Intellectual Property Organization

=== PPH programme ===
The Patent Prosecution Highway Programme (PPH Programme) constitutes bilateral agreements between the Eurasian Patent Office and other patent offices designed to provide applicants with opportunities to get a patent faster and more efficiently, in one of the participating patent offices. The programme allows for an accelerated examination of patents compared to applications from non-participating patent offices. Currently, partner offices participating in the programme include the Japan Patent Office, European Patent Office, China National Intellectual Property Administration, Korean Intellectual Property Office, and the Finnish Patent and Registration Office.

=== Exchange of patent documentation ===
In addition, according to its own web site, the EAPO maintains various agreements on the exchange of patent documentation with 38 countries across Asia, Europe, and North America.

The EAPO is recognized as an International Searching Authority and an International Preliminary Examining Authority.

== See also ==
- Outline of patents
- Patent offices in Europe
- Trilateral Patent Offices
