= Japan Patent Office =

Government agency that enforces intellectual property rights

Coordinates: 35°40′15.56″N 139°44′45.15″E

- 特許庁; Tokkyochō
- Logo

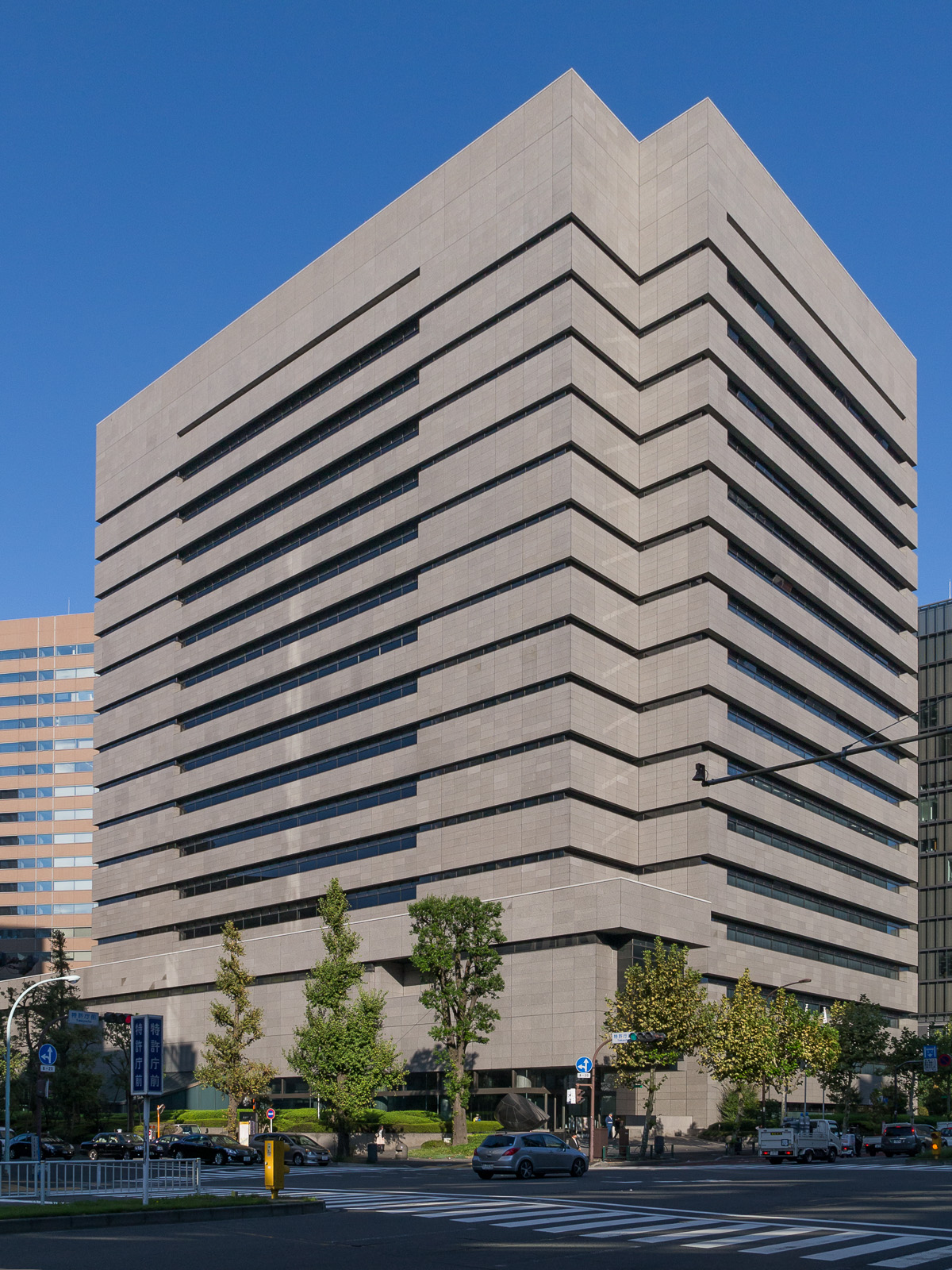
- Headquarters in 2012

Agency overview
- Formed: 18 April 1885
- Jurisdiction: Government of Japan
- Headquarters: 3-4-3 Kasumigaseki, Chiyoda, Tokyo, Japan 100-8915
- Agency executives: Koichi Hamano, Commissioner; Masanori Katsura, Deputy Commissioner
- Parent department: Ministry of Economy, Trade and Industry
- Website: www.jpo.go.jp/e/index.html

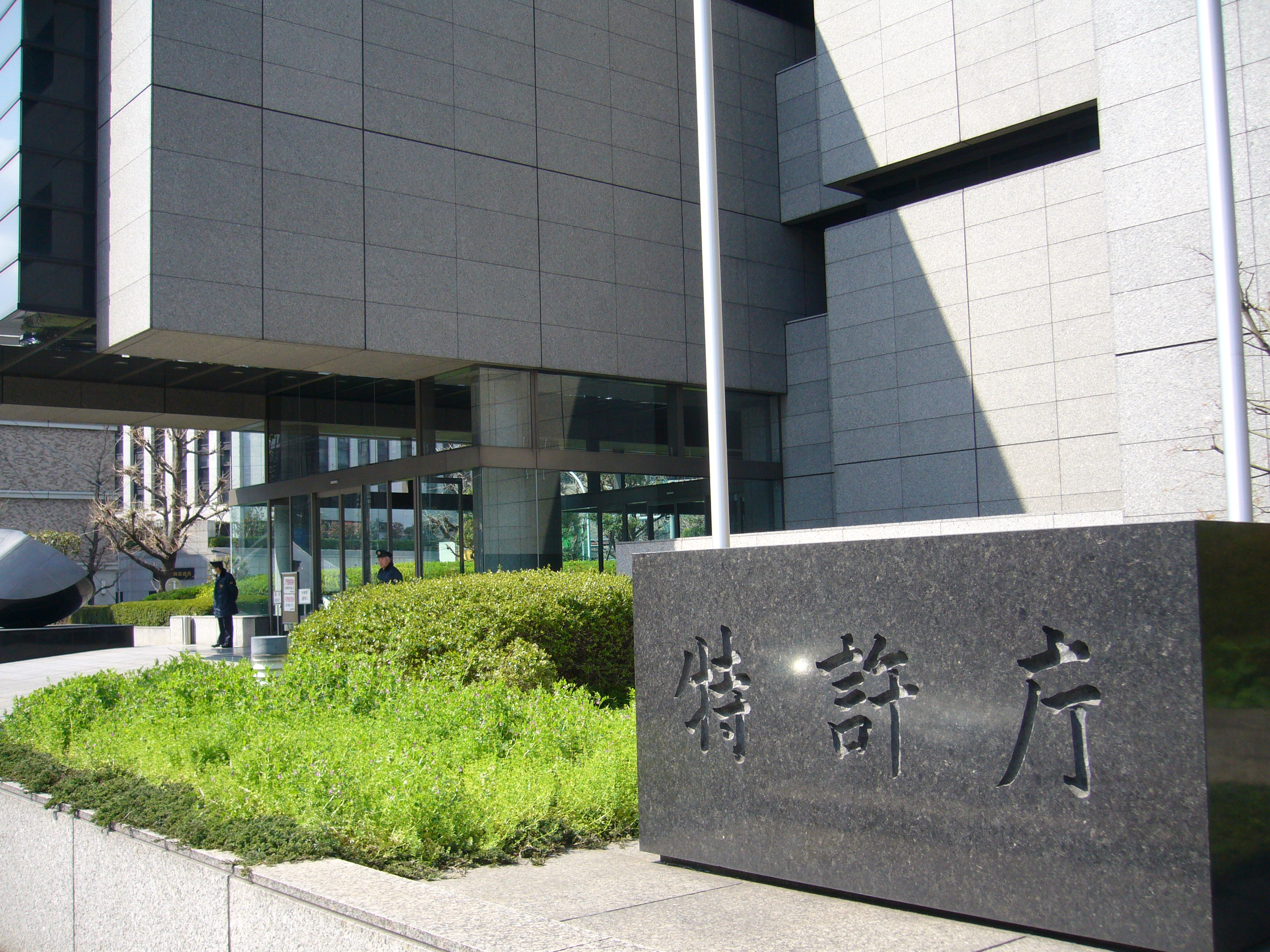
Entrance to the Japan Patent Office

The Japan Patent Office (特許庁, Tokkyochō; JPO) is a Japanese governmental agency in charge of industrial property right affairs, under the Ministry of Economy, Trade and Industry. The Japan Patent Office is located in Kasumigaseki, Chiyoda, Tokyo and is one of the world's largest patent offices. The Japan Patent Office's mission is to promote the growth of the Japanese economy and industry by administering the laws relating to patents, utility models, designs, and trademarks. Copyright affairs are administered by the Agency for Cultural Affairs.

The current Commissioner of the JPO is Koichi Hamano.

== Organization ==
The Japan Patent Office is headed by a commissioner and consists of seven departments:

- General Affairs Department
- Trademark, Design, and Administrative Affairs Department, in charge of examining trademark right applications, design right applications and formalities check of all applications including patent applications
- First Patent Examination Department, examining patent applications related to applied physics, optics, and architecture
- Second Patent Examination Department, examining patent applications related to machinery
- Third Patent Examination Department, examining patent applications related to chemistry, pharmacy, and biotechnology
- Fourth Patent Examination Department, examining patent applications related to electronics, telecommunication, and information technology
- Appeals Department

The commissioner of the JPO is appointed from among the higher officials of the Ministry of Economy, Trade and Industry and generally serves for at most two years.

== History ==
During the Edo period, the Tokugawa shogunate discouraged inventions in order to preserve the stability of the feudal society. In fact, Tokugawa Yoshimune, the eighth shōgun of the Tokugawa dynasty, decreed in 1721 the "Ban on Novelty" (新規御法度 shinki gohatto), which was intended to prohibit everything novel, especially clothing of rich design.

In 1868, the Tokugawa shogunate ended and a new reformist government took its place (the Meiji Restoration). The government studied the Great Powers and adopted a national policy of emulating them in various government areas. Industrial property rights were recognized as a means for catching up to Western governments.

The first patent law in Japan was thus established in 1871, though it was abandoned in the next year. Today, the founding date of Japanese patent law and of the Japan's patent office is considered to be April 18, 1885, when the "Patent Monopoly Act" (專賣特許條例 senbai tokkyo jōrei) was enacted. In 1899, Japan acceded to the Paris Convention for the Protection of Industrial Property. Takahashi Korekiyo was the first commissioner of the JPO.

The first patent was granted to Hotta Zuisho (堀田 瑞松), a lacquerware craftsman, on August 14, 1885. The patent granted to him was for an anticorrosive paint containing lacquer, which effectively protected ship bottoms from corrosion.

In 1978, Japan acceded to the Patent Cooperation Treaty (PCT). In 1980, the JPO adopted the International Patent Classification, discarding its own patent classification.

In 1989 the JPO moved into its current headquarters in Kasumigaseki.

== International cooperation ==
The JPO cooperates with the United States Patent and Trademark Office (USPTO) and the European Patent Office (EPO) as one of the Trilateral Patent Offices. It is also part of the IP5 along with the USPTO, EPO, the Korean Intellectual Property Office (KIPO), and China's State Intellectual Property Office (SIPO).

The JPO, SIPO and KIPO are referred to as "Asian Trilateral Offices".

== See also ==
- Japanese patent law
- Japanese trademark law
- Intellectual Property High Court
- F-term, a patent classification used by JPO
- Japan Intellectual Property Association (JIPA)
- Ten Japanese Great Inventors
