= Israel Patent Office =

Israeli government office

The Israel Patent Office (ILPO; Hebrew: רשות הפטנטים, המדגמים וסימני המסחר) (Reshut hapatentim), affiliated with the Israeli Ministry of Justice, handles issues related to intellectual property rights in Israel, including patents, designs, trademarks and appellations.

In September 2009, the Israel Patent Office was appointed by the Assembly of the PCT Union (International Patent Cooperation Union) as an International Searching Authority (ISA) and International Preliminary Examination Authority (IPEA). The Israel Patent Office started operating as an ISA and IPEA under the Patent Cooperation Treaty on 1 June 2012.

== See also ==
- List of Israeli inventions and discoveries
- Science and technology in Israel
- Economy of Israel
