= Ministry of Intellectual Property =

- 지식재산처

Agency overview
- Formed: 1st October 2025
- Preceding agency: Korean Intellectual Property Office
- Jurisdiction: Government of South Korea
- Headquarters: Daejeon
- Employees: 2000

The Ministry of Intellectual Property (MOIP; Korean: 지식재산처) is the patent office and intellectual property office of South Korea. In 2000, the name of the office was changed from "Korean Industrial Property Office" to "Korean Intellectual Property Office". It is located in Daejeon Metropolitan City.

Along with its counterparts from other countries, it forms part of the IP5 (intellectual property offices), which accounts for the majority of patents issued worldwide.

On 23 June 2009, the KIPO signed a Memorandum of Understanding with the Eurasian Patent Organization.

On 1st October 2025, the organization was elevated to the ministerial level, renamed as the Ministry of Intellectual Property.

== Logo ==
Logo used between 1998-2016

Logo used between 2016-2025

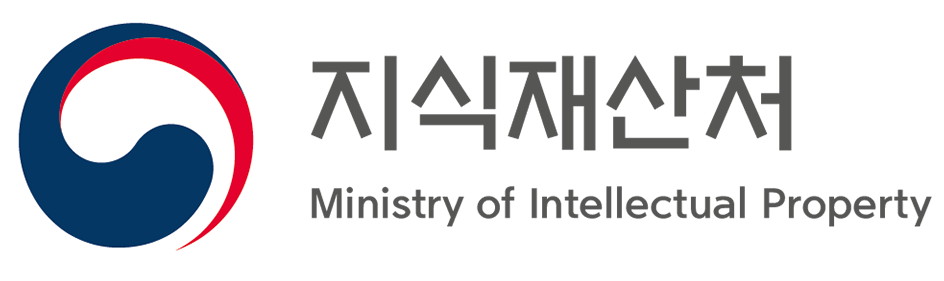
Current logo

== See also ==
- List of patent offices
