= China National Intellectual Property Administration =

Patent office of the People's Republic of China

- 国家知识产权局
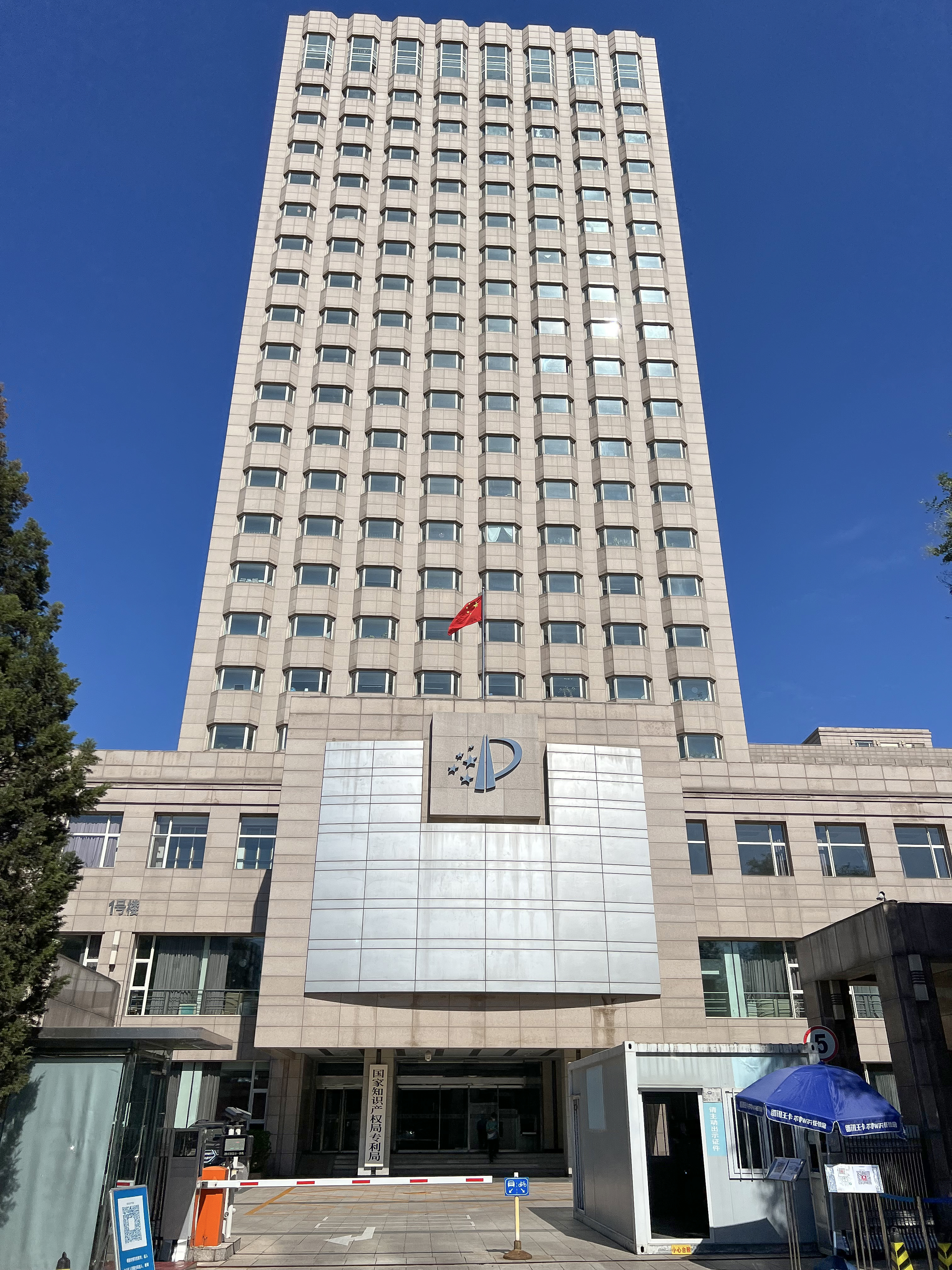
- Headquarters of the CNIPA

Agency overview
- Formed: 1980; 46 years ago
- Jurisdiction: China
- Headquarters: 6 Tucheng Road, West of Jimen Bridge, Haidian District, Beijing
- Agency executive: Shen Changyu, Director-General
- Parent agency: State Council
- Website: www.cnipa.gov.cn

China National Intellectual Property Administration
- Simplified Chinese: 国家知识产权局
- Traditional Chinese: 國家智慧財產局
- Literal meaning: State Intellectual Property Office
Transcriptions
Standard Mandarin
- Hanyu Pinyin: Guójiā zhīshì chǎnquán jú

Patents granted to Chinese and foreign inventors between 2002 and 2013.

The China National Intellectual Property Administration (CNIPA; 国家知识产权局) is the patent and trademark office and primary intellectual property regulator of the People's Republic of China.

== Naming ==
The agency was founded in 1980 as the Patent Office of the People's Republic of China, before changing its name to State Intellectual Property Office (SIPO) then to "National Intellectual Property Administration," and, in 2018, to China National Intellectual Property Administration as part of the deepening the reform of the Party and state institutions.

== History ==
SIPO established a database of patents granted for traditional Chinese medicine.

As SIPO, the institution became the world's largest patent office in 2011.

To streamline the patent application process for patentees filing under both the Chinese and United States systems, SIPO and the U.S. Patent and Trademark Office (USPTO) established a Patent Prosecution Highway (PPH) pilot program on December 1, 2011.

== Trademarks ==
Under China's trademark regulations, CNIPA has authority to register trademarks and organize a board that adjudicates trademark disputes and appeals. The agency has the power to confiscate and destroy any infringing marks, and issue fines up to 100,000 Yuan for certain violators.

== See also ==
- Intellectual property in the People's Republic of China
- First Sino-American Forum of Intellectual Property Rights
