= List of people associated with patent law =

This is a list of notable people associated with patent law and patent-related institutions. For a list of notable inventors, see list of inventors. For a list of notable patent attorneys, see list of patent attorneys and agents. For a list of notable patent examiners and clerks, see patent examiner. Although this list is not intended to include inventors, patent attorneys and patent clerks, those may also be inserted in this list if they made a durable impact on patent law, or patent-related institutions.

== A ==
- Arrow, Kenneth (joint winner of the Nobel Memorial Prize in Economics with John Hicks), known for Arrow information paradox, a problem that companies face when managing intellectual property across their boundaries

== B ==
- Banner, Don (1924–2006), former Commissioner of the United States Patent and Trademark Office (USPTO)
- Battistelli, Benoît (born 1950), former president of the European Patent Office
- van Benthem, Johannes Bob (1921–2006), first president of the European Patent Office
- Bodenhausen, Georg, former director of BIRPI and first Director General of World Intellectual Property Organization (WIPO)
- Bogsch, Árpád (1919–2004), former Director General of WIPO
- Bolkestein, Frits (born 1933), former European Commissioner for the Internal Market
- Braendli, Paul, second president of the European Patent Office
- Brimelow, Alison (born 1949), ex-Comptroller General of the United Kingdom Patent Office, fifth president of the European Patent Office

== D ==
- Dickinson, Q. Todd, former head of the USPTO
- Doll, John J., former acting United States Under Secretary of Commerce for Intellectual Property and director of the USPTO
- Dudas, Jon W., former head of the USPTO and U.S. Under Secretary of Commerce for Intellectual Property

== G ==
- Grossenbacher, Roland, former chairman of the Administrative Council of the European Patent Organisation
- Guellec, Dominique, French economist and former chief economist at the European Patent Office
- Gurry, Francis, current Director General of the WIPO
- George Washington, the signer of the first patent

== H ==
- Haberman, Mandy, famous British inventor of the Any-way up Cup
- Haertel, Kurt (1910–2000), considered one of the founding fathers of the European patent system

== I ==
- Idris, Kamil, former WIPO Director General

== J ==
- Jefferson, Thomas, first United States Commissioner of Patents

== K ==
- Kappos, David, former Director of the United States Patent and Trademark Office
- Kober, Ingo (born 1942), third president of the European Patent Office

== L ==
- Laddie, Sir Hugh (1946–2008), former UK judge
- Lehman, Bruce (born 1945), former U.S. Commissioner of Patents and Trademarks
- Lemelson, Jerome H. (1923–1997), controversial American inventor and patent holder, associated with submarine patents

== M ==
- Marchant, Ron, former Comptroller General of Patents, Trade Marks and Designs (UK), also Trade Mark Registrar, Designs Registrar and Chief Executive of the United Kingdom Patent Office, now known as the UK Intellectual Property Office.
- Markey, Howard T. (1920–2006), first chief justice of the United States Court of Appeals for the Federal Circuit
- Messerli, Peter, former Vice-President, head of the DG 3 (Appeals) of the European Patent Office (EPO)

== N ==
- Nakajima, Makoto, former head of Japan Patent Office
- Nies, Helen, former chief judge of United States Court of Appeals for the Federal Circuit (deceased).

== O ==
- Ono, Shinjiro, former Deputy commissioner of the Japan Patent Office

== P ==
- Phillips, Jeremy, academic and author in intellectual property law
- Pompidou, Alain (born 1942), French scientist and politician, fourth president of the European Patent Office
- van Pottelsberghe, Bruno (born 1968), chief economist at the European Patent Organisation
- Prescott, Peter QC, Patent Barrister and occasional Deputy High Court of England and Wales judge in matters relating to patents (United Kingdom)

== R ==
- Giles Sutherland Rich, (1904–1999), United States Judge, Court of Customs and Patent Appeals, and United States Court of Appeals for the Federal Circuit.
- Rader, Randall (born 1949), federal judge on the United States Court of Appeals for the Federal Circuit.
- Rogan, James E. (born 1957), former Under Secretary of Commerce for Intellectual Property, U.S., and former director of USPTO.

== S ==
- Singer, Romuald, author of Singer & Stauder, The European Patent Convention – A Commentary
- Stallman, Richard, Campaigner on public interest and Free and Open Source Software.
- Stauder, Dieter, former Director of the International Section of the Centre for International Industrial Property Studies (CEIPI), author of Singer & Stauder, The European Patent Convention – A Commentary
- Stern, Richard H., academic, author on intellectual property, and former chief of Patent Section in U.S. Department of Justice
- Straus, Joseph, director of the Max Planck Institute for Intellectual Property, Competition and Tax Law and leading patent scholar
- Sugimura, Nobuchika, first chairman of the Japan Patent Attorneys Association
- Suzuki, Takashi (born 1949), Commissioner of the Japan Patent Office since July 2008

== T ==
- Takahashi, Korekiyo (1854–1936), first commissioner of the Japan Patent Office, then Prime Minister of Japan

== See also ==
- Glossary of patent law terms

== External links and references ==
- IP Hall of Fame, web site sponsored by the IAM (Intellectual Asset Management) Magazine
