= WIPO Convention =

1967 multilateral treaty establishing the WIPO

Convention establishing the World Intellectual Property Organization
- Type: Intellectual property
- Signed: 14 July 1967
- Location: Stockholm, Sweden
- Effective: 26 April 1970
- Condition: 10 ratifications by Paris Union states plus seven ratifications by Berne Union states
- Signatories: 50
- Parties: 194
- Depositary: Director General of the World Intellectual Property Organization
- Languages: English, French, Russian, and Spanish

The WIPO Convention (formally, the Convention establishing the World Intellectual Property Organization) is a multilateral treaty that established the World Intellectual Property Organization (WIPO). It was signed at Stockholm, Sweden, on 14 July 1967 and entered into force on 26 April 1970.

As of August 22, 2025, the convention had 194 contracting States.

== History ==
=== Paris and Berne Conventions (1883 and 1886) ===
The Paris Convention for the Protection of Industrial Property, adopted in 1883, was one of the first intellectual property treaties. In its original text it established a Union for the protection of industrial property and the organization of an international office under the title Bureau international de l'Union pour la Protection de la propriété industrielle, which "shall be placed under the high authority of the highest Government authorities (Administration supérieure) of the Swiss Confederation."

Three years later, with the adoption of the Berne Convention for the Protection of Literary and Artistic Works in 1886, a second international bureau was created: the Bureau international pour la protection des œuvres littéraires et artistiques, also under the supervision of the Swiss Federal Government.

Following the creation of the Berne Office, the Swiss Government effectively merged it with the Paris Office by appointing the same director and staff to both organizations. Nevertheless, this unification was not formally established until the decree issued by the Swiss Federal Council on November 11, 1892, creating the United Bureaus. Eventually, these united offices would come to be known as the Bureaux internationaux réunis pour la protection de la propriété intellectuelle (United International Bureaux for the Protection of Intellectual Property), or BIRPI.

=== Modernization of BIRPI ===
By the middle of the twentieth century, the institutional structure of BIRPI, which had been designed in the previous century, had become inadequate for the political and technical realities of the time. By the 1960s, four international intellectual property agreements had established their own respective unions:

- Madrid Agreement Concerning the International Registration of Marks (1891)
- Hague Agreement Concerning the International Deposit of Industrial Designs (1925)
- Nice Agreement Concerning the International Classification of Goods and Services for the Purposes of the Registration of Marks (1957)
- Lisbon Agreement for the Protection of Appellations of Origin and their International Registration (1958).

These unions lacked assemblies of member states with decision-making authority and were all administered by BIRPI. Consequently, oversight of their activities and finances remained in the hands of the Swiss Government.

Additionally, other similar international organizations established in the nineteenth century like BIRPI, such as the Universal Postal Union and the International Telecommunication Union, were also modernized and became specialized agencies of the United Nations in 1949 and 1948, respectively.

One of the strongest advocates for the modernization of BIRPI was Jacques Secrétan, who served as its director from 1953 to 1963. In a speech delivered in 1956, he outlined a reform program based on three main ideas: intellectual property rights should receive international protection through an intergovernmental organization dedicated to them; this organization should have its own jurisdiction and its own governing bodies so that it could represent those rights effectively in international relations; and that BIRPI should become part of what he called the “great family of the United Nations.”

In 1960, Secrétan oversaw the transfer of BIRPI’s headquarters from Bern to Geneva, home to the United Nations’ European headquarters and several of its specialized agencies. The move offered practical advantages and symbolically reinforced BIRPI’s ambition to become part of the United Nations system.

=== Stockholm Conference (1967) ===
Beginning in 1963, under the leadership of Georg H. C. Bodenhausen, with Arpad Bogsch serving as deputy director, BIRPI’s structural and administrative reform began to take shape. The process moved forward through a working party convened for this purpose, which met in May 1964, and a committee of experts that met twice, in March 1965 and May 1966. The working party included representatives from Czechoslovakia, France, the Federal Republic of Germany, Hungary, Italy, Japan, Sweden, Switzerland, the United Kingdom, and the United States of America.

Sweden announced that it was prepared to host an international conference in its capital, Stockholm. The meeting was later officially named the "Intellectual Property Conference of Stockholm" of 1967. The convention was signed at Stockholm, Sweden, on 14 July 1967 and entered into force on 26 April 1970. That international instrument established the World Intellectual Property Organization (WIPO), which replaced the BIRPI. WIPO would become part of the United Nations in 1974.

The convention was amended on 28 September 1979. These amendments changed the periodicity of WIPO's budget and ordinary assemblies from triennial to biennial.

== Main legal provisions ==
The Convention consists of a preamble and 21 provisions. The main purpose of the instrument was to establish the World Intellectual Property Organization (Article 1) and to define its functions and organizational structure.

=== Objectives and functions ===
According to Article 3, the objectives of the WIPO are:

- "to promote the protection of intellectual property throughout the world through cooperation among States and, where appropriate, in collaboration with any other international organization",
- "to ensure administrative cooperation among the Unions."

In order to attain such objectives, the organization have the following functions:

- "shall promote the development of measures designed to facilitate the efficient protection of intellectual property throughout the world and to harmonize national legislation in this field";
- "shall perform the administrative tasks of the Paris Union, the Special Unions established in relation with that Union, and the Berne Union";
- "may agree to assume, or participate in, the administration of any other international agreement designed to promote the protection of intellectual property";
- "shall encourage the conclusion of international agreements designed to promote the protection of intellectual property";
- "shall offer its cooperation to States requesting legal-technical assistance in the field of intellectual property";
- "shall assemble and disseminate information concerning the protection of intellectual property, carry out and promote studies in this field, and publish the results of such studies";
- "shall maintain services facilitating the international protection of intellectual property and, where appropriate, provide for registration in this field and the publication of the data concerning the registrations";
- "shall take all other appropriate action".

=== Membership ===
Membership in WIPO is open to any State that is a member of any of the Unions and to any other State satisfying one of the following conditions:

- it is a member of the United Nations, any of the specialized agencies brought into relationship with the United Nations, or the International Atomic Energy Agency;
- it is a party to the Statute of the International Court of Justice; or
- it has been invited by the General Assembly of WIPO to become a party to the Convention.

=== Decision bodies ===
The WIPO Convention establishes three main organs:

- the WIPO General Assembly, composed of the Member States of WIPO which are also members of any of the Unions.
- the WIPO Conference, composed of the States party to the WIPO Convention.
- the WIPO Coordination Committee, composed of members elected from among the members of the Executive Committee of the Paris Union and the Executive Committee of the Berne Union.

Some of the main functions of the General Assembly are: the appointment of the Director General upon nomination by the Coordination Committee, review and approval of the reports of the Director General and the reports and activities of the Coordination Committee, adoption of the biennial budget common to the Unions, and adoption of the financial regulations of the Organization.

=== The International Bureau ===
According to Article 9, the Secretariat of the Organization is called the International Bureau, which head is the Director General who is appointed by the WIPO General Assembly and is assisted by two or more Deputy Directors General. The Director General shall be appointed for a six year term.

The headquarters of the Organization are in Geneva, Switzerland (Article 10).

== Contracting parties ==
As of August 22, 2025, the convention had 194 contracting States.

The only two United Nations Member States that are not parties to the WIPO Convention, and therefore are not members of WIPO, are Palau and South Sudan. (Note: The reference cited, dated on 2023, enumerates three UN member states that are not members of WIPO: Micronesia, Palau and South Sudan. Nevertheless, Micronesia joined WIPO on June 19, 2025.)

The convention is written in English, French, Russian and Spanish, all texts being equally authentic.

== See also ==
- Paris Convention for the Protection of Industrial Property
- Berne Convention for the Protection of Literary and Artistic Works
- World Intellectual Property Day
