= Kurt Haertel =

German lawyer (1910–2000)

Kurt Haertel (26 September 1910, Berlin – 30 March 2000, Seefeld am Ammersee) was a German patent lawyer. He played a leading role in the establishment of the European patent system. He is sometimes referred to as one of the "fathers of the European patent law", or the "father of European patent law". He was President of the Deutsches Patent- und Markenamt (German Patent and Trade Mark Office) from 1963 to 1975. In October 1977, he was elected Honorary Chairman of the Administrative Council of the European Patent Organisation.

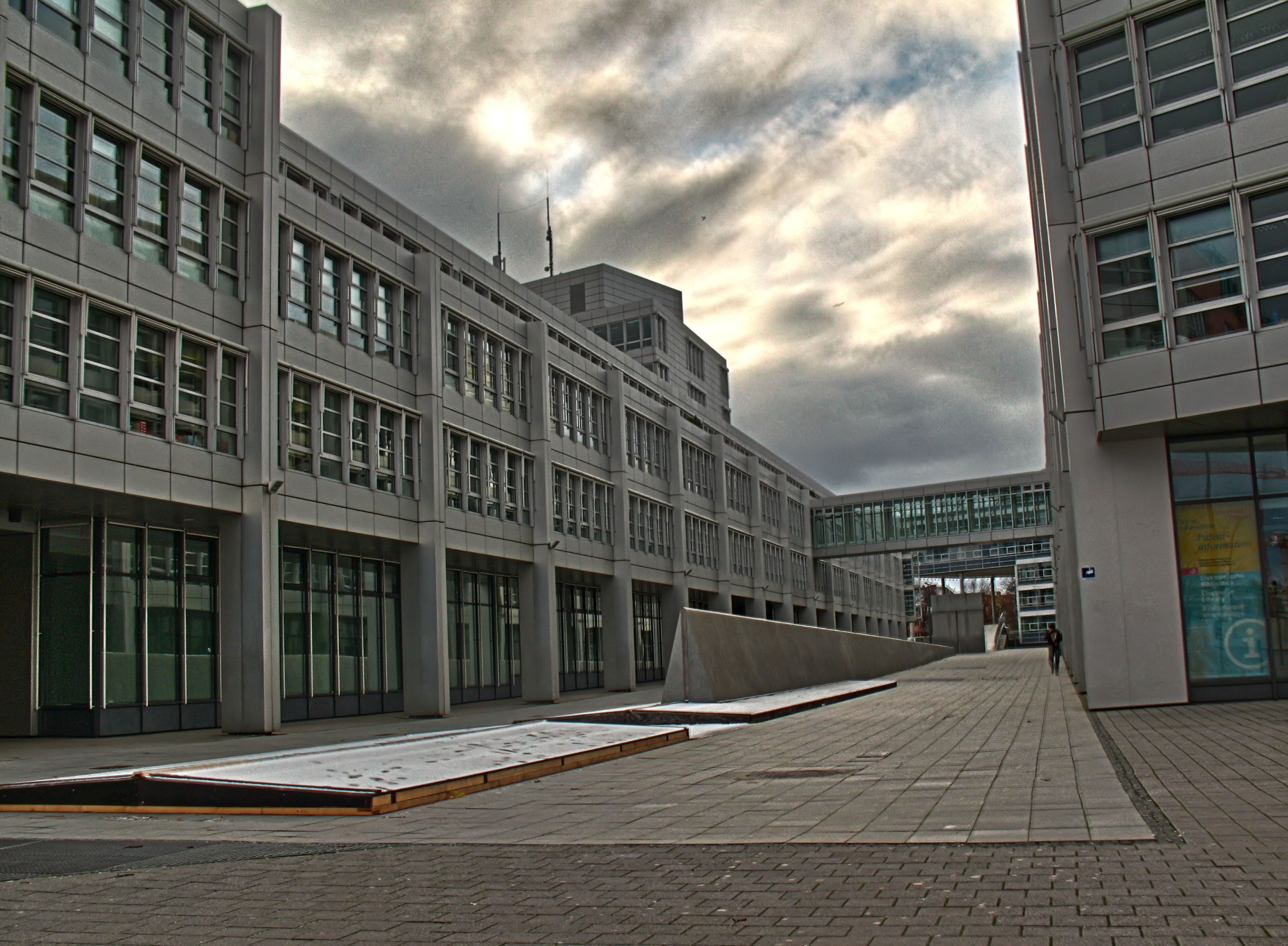
European Patent Office, Kurt-Haertel-Passage, in Munich, Germany

Since 2003, a street in Munich, Germany, is named after him, the "Kurt-Haertel-Passage". This is the connecting path from the Grasserstraße to the Bayerstraße near the buildings of the European Patent Office.

== Publications ==
- Die Rückgliederung des Saarlandes auf dem Gebiet des gewerblichen Rechtsschutzes, des Wettbewerbsrechts und des Urheberrechts, GRUR 1957, 98 (with Albrecht Krieger)
- The New European Patent System, Its Present Situation and Significance, (Dec. 1978) I.I.C., Vol. 19, No.6

== See also ==
- Romuald Singer
- Dieter Stauder
- Johannes Bob van Benthem

Government offices
Preceded by ?	President of the Deutsches Patent- und Markenamt (German Patent and Trade Mark Office); 1963–1975	Succeeded by ?
