= Željko Topić =

Željko Topić (born 5 August 1959) is a Croatian civil servant, and a former Vice-President of the European Patent Office (EPO). Before taking up his position at the EPO, he was the Director General of the State Intellectual Property Office of the Republic of Croatia.

== Career ==
He started his career as an economist with the Federal Yugoslavian Railways in Banja Luka. From 1989 to 1992 he was an adviser at the Croatian Ministry of Science & Technology in Zagreb. In 1992, he joined the Croatian State Intellectual Property Office which came under the remit of the Ministry of Science & Technology and he held various posts there until 2003 when he left to become a partner in a private-sector intellectual property management company, Korper, Haramija & Topić Ltd.

In 2004, he was appointed as Director General of the Croatian State Intellectual Property Office for a four-year term. In this capacity he represented Croatia on the Administrative Council of the European Patent Organisation from 2004 onward. Croatia became a full member of the EPO in 2008. In 2006, Topić was proposed as a candidate for a senior management position at the World Intellectual Property Organization (WIPO). His candidacy was unsuccessful.

In March 2008, his mandate as Director General of the Croatian State Intellectual Property Office was renewed for a second four-year term. In 2009, he was once again an unsuccessful candidate for a senior management position at the WIPO.

In January 2012, his mandate as Director General of the Croatian State Intellectual Property Office was renewed for a third term.

During a visit by a delegation from the Hungarian Intellectual Property Office to the Croatian State Intellectual Property Office in February 2012, he was presented with the Jedlik Ányos Award (Honoris Causa) in recognition of his contribution to the protection of intellectual property.

In March 2012, the Administrative Council of the EPO announced his appointment as Vice-President at the EPO in charge of the Directorate-General Administration which has responsibility for support services such as Human Resources, General Administration, Buildings and Facility Management, and the Language Service. He commenced his duties as EPO Vice-President in April 2012. His term of office as Director General of the Croatian State Intellectual Property Office ended on 30 April 2012.

In December 2018, the Administrative Council of the European Patent Organisation took leave of Topić as one of three departing Vice-Presidents. Nellie Simon was appointed as his successor as Vice-President of the EPO's Directorate-General Corporate Services and took up the position on 1 January 2019.

Topić's appointment as EPO Vice-President has been controversial. Following the announcement of his appointment in March 2012, a number of critical news reports appeared in the Croatian media. These reports referred to a series of alleged irregularities which were said to have occurred during his period of office as Director-General of the State Intellectual Property Office and which it was claimed had not been properly investigated by the competent state authorities. In response, the State Intellectual Property Office issued a press release on 30 April 2012 attributing the media reports to what it called "unprofessional journalism" and dismissing the allegations raised against Topić as "arbitrary", "unfounded" and based on "malicious accusations".

A complaint which Topić filed in reaction to an article written by the journalist Slavica Lukić for "Jutarnji list" was, however, rejected by the Ethics Council of the Croatian Journalist's Association (Croatian: Hrvatsko Novinarsko Društvo or HND) in September 2012. The Ethics Council found that Lukić had verified the relevant information with the appropriate official institutions and that the disputed article was not written with the intention of defaming anyone but rather in defence of the public interest.

In December 2013, a Croatian NGO Juris Protecta raised questions about Topić's EPO appointment and submitted a petition to the European Parliament calling for an independent investigation into the matter. According to Intellectual Property Watch, Topić and EPO President Benoît Battistelli claim that the allegations amount to a “smear campaign.” However, a former Assistant Director at the Croatian State Intellectual Property Office, Vesna Stilin, has disputed the claims made by Topić and Battistelli in this regard.

It has been reported in the Croatian media that a criminal complaint against Topic was dismissed as inadmissible by the Zagreb County Court on 19 February 2016. Details of the case were not published but it was subsequently reported that it is currently pending before a three-judge appeal panel of the Zagreb County Court.

On 8 February 2023, the Croatian Parliament appointed Topić as a member of the Council for Electronic Media (Vijeće za elektroničke medije), together with Anita Malenica and Davor Marić.

== See also ==
- Art. 23 1/15, Art. 23 2/15 and Art. 23 1/16
