= Guellec =

- Pronunciation: pronounced [ɡɛlːek]

Origin
- Origin: Breton
- Meaning: tanned, burnished.
- Region of origin: Brittany

Other names
- Variant forms: Le Guellec, Gellec

Guellec is a surname, and may refer to:

Guellec derives from gellek which means 'burnished' in Breton. (cf. gell)

- Dominique Guellec - French economist
- Ambroise Guellec - French politician and Member of the European Parliament
- Jean-Philippe Leguellec - Canadian biathlete
