= SIPO =

SIPO or Sipo can refer to:

== Government organizations ==
- Sicherheitspolizei, often abbreviated SiPo, the Security Police of Nazi Germany
- Estonian Security Police and SD, Sipo, a security police force created by the Germans in 1942 in occupied Estonia
- Standards in Public Office Commission, Ireland
- State Intellectual Property Office, former name of China's patent office (now the Chinese National Intellectual Property Administration)
- State Intellectual Property Office (Croatia), the patent office of Croatia

== Species ==
- South Island oystercatcher or South Island pied oystercatcher, a bird species in New Zealand
- Sipo, some snakes of the genus Chironius
- Entandrophragma utile or Sipo, an African tree species - see Entandrophragma

== Other uses ==
- In electronics, serial in parallel out (SIPO) block:
  - of a serializer/deserializer (SerDes) in high speed communications.
  - of a shift register
- Sipo (footballer) (born 1988), Equatoguinean footballer

== See also ==
- Sipos (disambiguation)
- Sipoo, a municipality in Finland
