= Josef Kratochvíl =

Josef Kratochvíl may refer to:

- Josef Kratochvíl (footballer) (1905–1984), Czech footballer
- Josef Kratochvíl (civil servant), Czech civil servant and current president of the Industrial Property Office of the Czech Republic
- Josef Kratochvíl (1909–1992), Czech zoologist
