= Alison Brimelow =

British civil servant

Alison Jane Brimelow CBE (born 1949) is a British civil servant and former chief executive and Comptroller General of the UK Patent Office, now known as the Intellectual Property Office. She was the fifth President of the European Patent Office, a position she held from 1 July 2007 to 30 June 2010.

== Early life and education ==
Born in Havana, Cuba, she is one of the two daughters of Sir Thomas Brimelow, a British diplomat, who was Permanent Under-Secretary in the British Foreign Office in 1973–75 and Member of the European Parliament in 1977–78, and Jean Cull. She holds a degree from the University of East Anglia.

== Career ==
She joined the British Diplomatic Service in 1973. In 1976, she joined the Department of Trade and Industry (DTI). She worked in a variety of Headquarters policy jobs, including private office. She joined the Patent Office in 1991, where she became Head of the Trade Marks Registry.

In 1997 she returned to DTI Headquarters to work on European and International Competition Policy. She was appointed chief executive and Comptroller General of the Patent Office in March 1999. She held the post of chief executive and Comptroller General of the Patent Office from March 1999 to end of December 2003.

In 2003 she was elected President of the European Patent Office jointly with Professor Alain Pompidou of France. She resigned from the UK Civil Service on 31 December 2003. From 2003 to 2006, she was Deputy Chairman of the Administrative Council of the European Patent Organisation.

From November 2004 to December 2006, she was Chair of the Steering Board of the National Weights and Measures Laboratory, a UK Government organisation. In February 2005 she was elected Associate Fellow of Templeton College, Saïd Business School, Oxford.

Her term of office as president of the European Patent Office (EPO) began on 1 July 2007. In May 2009, she informed the EPO staff that she would not seek an extension of her contract which ended on 30 June 2010. There were initially four candidates to succeed her, Susanne Ås Sivborg, Benoît Battistelli, Roland Grossenbacher, and Jesper Kongstad. In March 2010, it was then made known that she would be succeeded by Benoît Battistelli on 1 July 2010.

In September 2010, Alison Brimelow took on the role of chairman of the Board of Trustees of Hartlebury Castle Preservation Trust. In June 2011 she became Chairman of the Intellectual Property Institute.

== Honours ==
She was appointed Commander of the Order of the British Empire in 2005, "for services to Intellectual Property Law." In 2011, she was awarded the Commander's Cross of the Order of Merit of the Federal Republic of Germany (German: Grosses Bundesverdienstkreuz).

She is a member of the Athenaeum Club.

Positions in intergovernmental organisations
Preceded by Alain Pompidou	President of the European Patent Office; 2007–2010	Succeeded by Benoît Battistelli
