= Johan van Benthem =

Johan van Benthem may refer to:

- Johannes Bob van Benthem (1921–2006), first president of the European Patent Office
- Johan van Benthem (logician) (born 1949), Dutch professor of logic
