= Swiss Federal Institute of Intellectual Property =

Facility in Bern, Switzerland

- (in German) Eidgenössisches Institut für Geistiges Eigentum (in French) Institut fédéral de la propriété intellectuelle (in Italian) Istituto federale della proprietà intellettuale (in Romansh) Institut federal da proprietad intellectuala
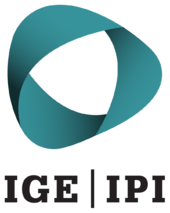

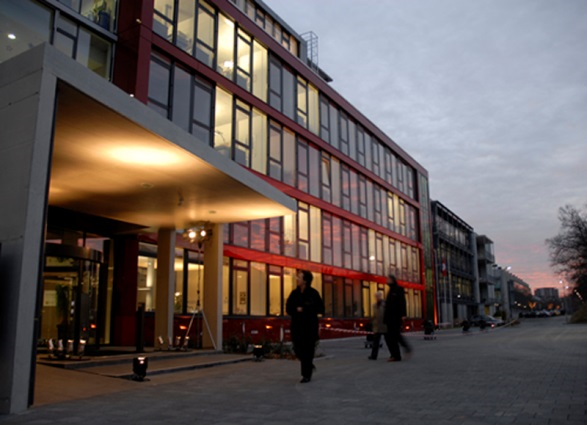
- Building of the Federal Institute of Intellectual Property in Bern

Agency overview
- Jurisdiction: Federal administration of Switzerland
- Headquarters: Bern
- Minister responsible: Beat Jans, Federal Councillor
- Parent agency: Federal Department of Justice and Police
- Website: www.ige.ch

The Swiss Federal Institute of Intellectual Property (IPI), (Note: German: Eidgenössisches Institut für Geistiges Eigentum, French: Institut fédéral de la propriété intellectuelle, Italian: Istituto federale della proprietà intellettuale) based in Bern, is an agency of the federal administration of Switzerland responsible for patents, trademarks, geographical indications, industrial designs and copyright.

It is part of the Federal Department of Justice and Police. Since 1996, it operates as an autonomous agency with control of its own budget.

== History ==
The Federal Intellectual Property Agency was founded on 15 November 1888. Albert Einstein worked there as a patent clerk for several years, including 1905, his Annus Mirabilis (miracle year). That year, while continuing to work on patents, Einstein published four groundbreaking papers that are fundamental to modern physics.

The agency was renamed the Federal Office of Intellectual Property in 1978 as part of the new administrative organisation law. On 1 January 1996, it received the status of an independent public law institution and continued under the name of the Swiss Federal Institute of Intellectual Property (IPI).

== Mandate and services ==
Federal Act on the Status and Tasks of the Swiss Federal Institute of Intellectual Property (IPIA)
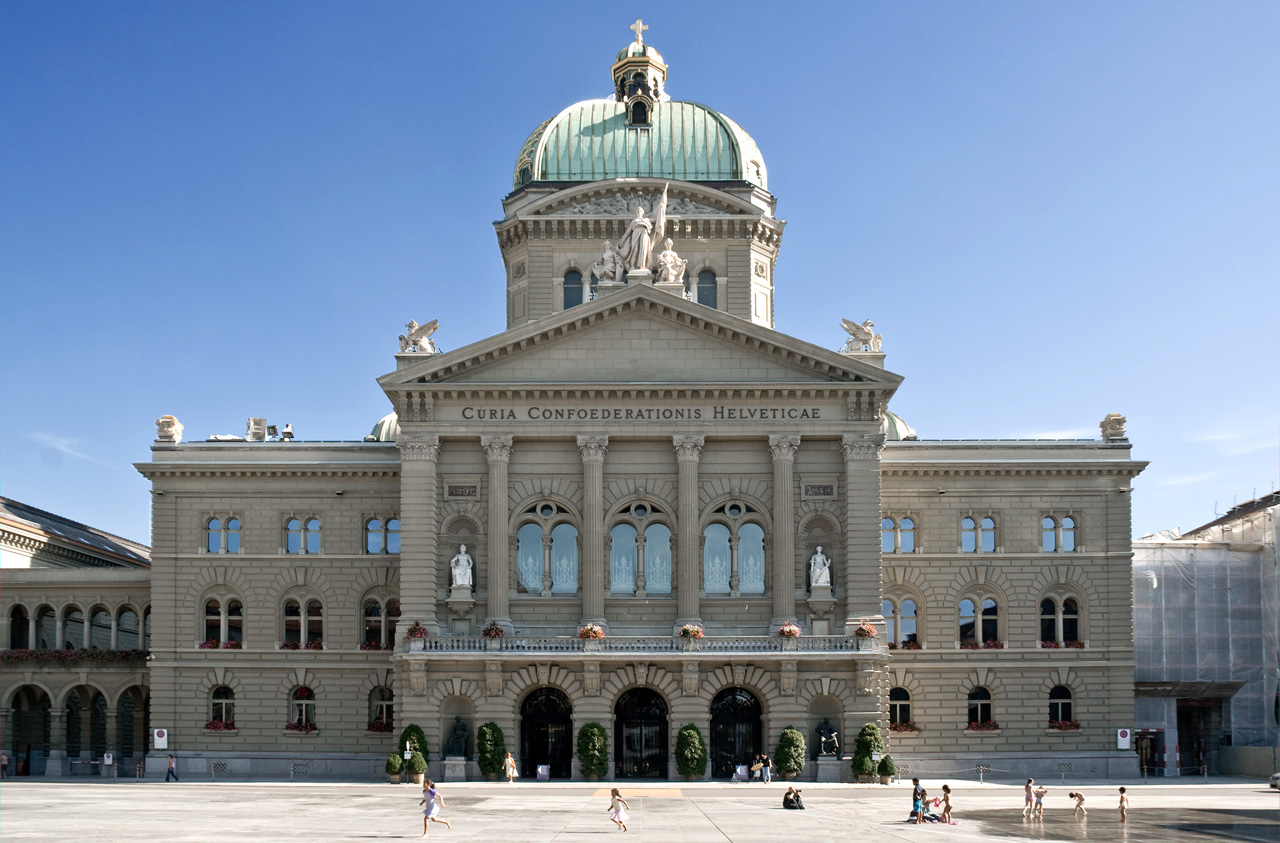

Federal Assembly of Switzerland
- Long title: (SR 172.010.31)
- Territorial extent: Switzerland
- Enacted by: Federal Assembly of Switzerland
- Enacted: 24 March 1995
- Commenced: 1 January 1996
- Status: Current legislation

The IPI is responsible for administering industrial property rights such as patents, trademarks, and designs. It collaborates with national and international bodies to safeguard Swiss indications of source. The institute also regulates copyright collection societies and provides information on intellectual property rights to individuals and businesses.

The IPI's tasks are laid down in Federal Act on the Status and Tasks of the Swiss Federal Institute of Intellectual Property (IPIA) (Note: German: Bundesgesetz über Statut und Aufgaben des Eidgenössischen Instituts für Geistiges Eigentum, IGEG; French: Loi fédérale sur le statut et les tâches de l’Institut Fédéral de la Propriété Intellectuelle, LIPI; Italian: Legge federale sullo statuto e sui compiti dell’Istituto federale della proprietà intellettuale, LIPI) adopted by the Federal Assembly in 1995. Its main tasks are:

- The granting of intellectual property (IP) rights: The IPI is the central point of contact for patent, trade mark and design applications in Switzerland and, depending on the procedure, also for international applications. It examines national applications, grants IP rights and administers the relevant registers. Its official organ for publishing IP rights is the online database Swissreg. Information from the IP registers on IP rights and protected topographies can be found in this database free of charge.
- Sovereign duty to provide information: The IPI informs industry stakeholders, educational institutions and the public about the intellectual property protection systems and how they can be utilised to the best advantage.
- Political services: The IPI prepares legislation on patents for inventions, designs, copyright and related rights, topographies of semiconductor products, trade marks and indications of source, public coats of arms and other public signs, as well as other enactments in the field of intellectual property. It advises the federal authorities and represents Switzerland in all intellectual property issues in international organisations and in negotiations with third states.
- Commercial information services: The IPI carries out patent searches on the basis of private law under the label of ip-search; in particular, it carries out prior art searches, validity searches (opposition searches), patent infringement searches (freedom-to-operate) and strategic patent analyses.

The IPI examines patent applications but this examination, as of 2021, does not include checking whether the invention meets the novelty and inventive step requirements.

== Notable employees ==
Directors General

- 1888 – 1921 Friedrich Haller
- 1921 – 1935 Walther Kraft
- 1935 – 1962 Hans Morf
- 1962 – 1969 Joseph Voyame (1923–2010)
- 1969 – 1975 Walter Stamm
- 1976 – 1985 Paul Brändli
- 1985 – 1989 Jean-Louis Comte
- 1989 – 2015 Roland Grossenbacher (born 1950)
- 2015 – present Catherine Chammartin

Technical experts

- 1902 – 1909 Albert Einstein (1879–1955)

== See also ==
- Copyright law of Switzerland
- Swiss Federal Patent Court
- Swiss made
