= Stauder =

Stauder is a German language toponymic surname. Notable people with the name include:

- Dieter Stauder (1940), German attorney-at-law and an expert in intellectual property law
- Franz Stauder (1977), former German professional tennis player
- Jacob Carl Stauder (1694–1756), Swiss-German painter in the Baroque style

== See also ==
- Stauder v City of Ulm, a landmark court case (1969) concerning the protection of human rights in the European Union
