= Banque Worms =

Former French merchant bank

- Type: Bank
- Founded: 1928
- Founder: Hypolite Worms
- Defunct: 2004
- Fate: Dissolved
- Headquarters: Paris, France
- Number of employees: 1,170 (1999)
- Parent: Worms & Cie

The Banque Worms was a merchant bank founded by Hypolite Worms in 1928 as a division of Worms & Cie. The banking services division provided financing services to other branches of Worms & Cie, which were involved in ship building, shipping and the coal trade. During World War II (1939–45), Worms & Cie was placed under German supervision, and was subject to intense scrutiny after the war on suspicions of collaboration. The banking services division was spun off as the independent Banque Worms et Cie in 1964. The bank was nationalized in 1982 by the socialist government of François Mitterrand. The bank engaged in risky real estate investments, and lost most of its value. After being re-privatized, it was owned in turn by two insurance groups, then was acquired by Deutsche Bank. The bank was wound down in 2004.

== Early years ==
Hypolite Worms joined Worms & Cie, which had been founded by his grandfather, in 1910. He became a managing partner and effective head of the organization on 1 January 1916. In 1928 Worms & Cie had three branches: coal trading, shipping, and ship building. Hypolite Worms decided to found a fourth branch for banking, the services bancaires (banking services), modelled on English merchant banks. Raymond Poincaré had stabilized the franc on 25 June 1928, and the banking industry was entering what promised to be a prosperous period.

At first the banking services department mainly handled signature transactions, or bank acceptances, in the spirit of a merchant bank. The other departments of Worms & Cie became customers, as did companies associated with the partners. Signature transactions led to discounting commercial paper. This led to deposits, which enabled new types of financial transactions and equity investments. Banking services was involved in various financing operations during the difficult period of the Great Depression. Ferdinand Vial joined the organization as chief of banking services on 4 July 1928. Lucien Guérin joined in July 1934. He had previously held the same position with the Banque de Suède et de Paris, and had connections in the Nordic and Scandinavian countries. Banking services began to establish privileged relationships with northern Europe. Gabriel Le Roy Ladurie was appointed head of the department in June 1936. By 1939 banking services had solid arrangements with banks in London and New York.

== World War II ==
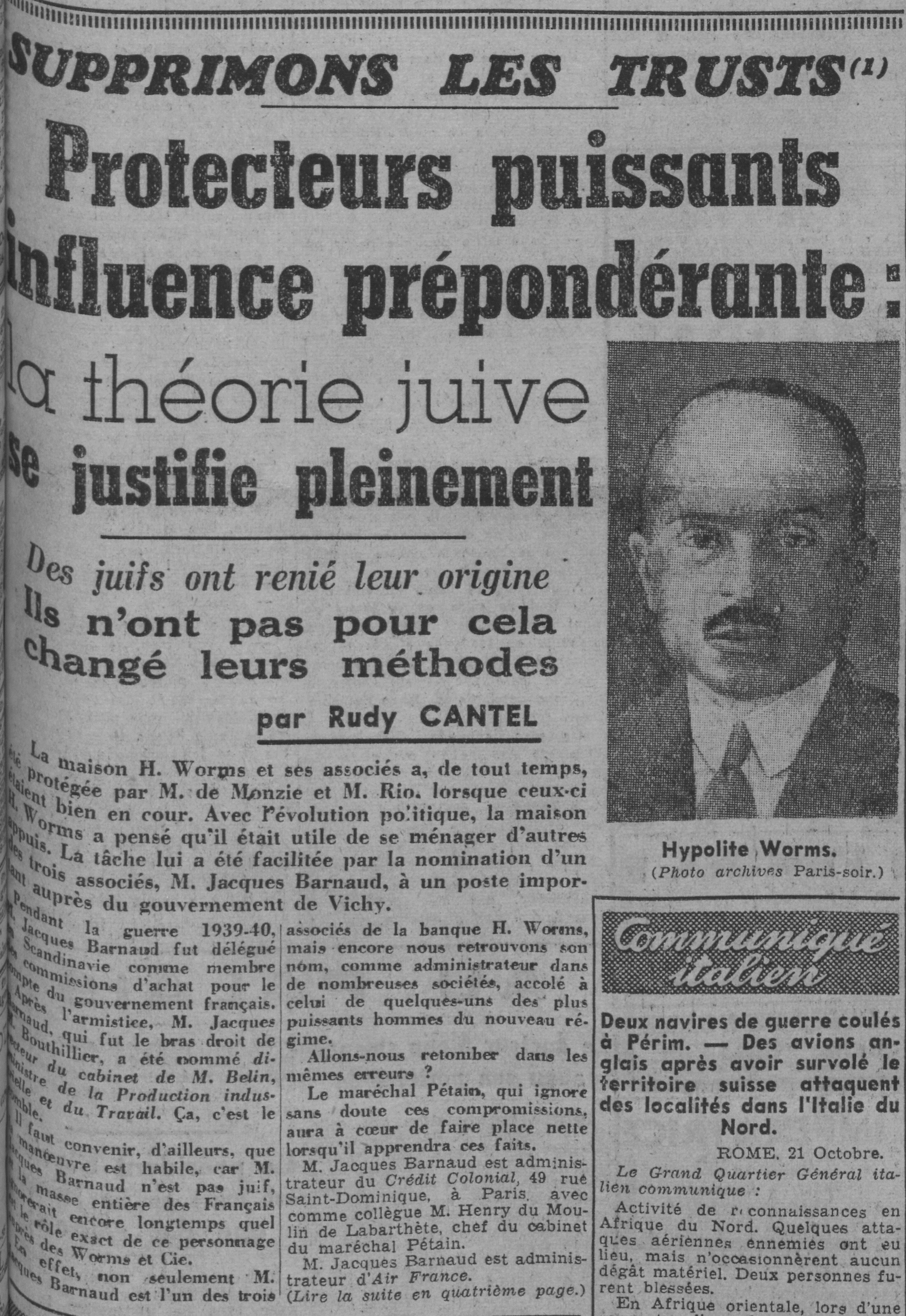
Paris-soir 23 October 1940. Antisemitic and anti-trust article attacking Worms

After the outbreak of World War II (1939–45), in November 1939, Hypolite Worms was placed in charge of the French delegation to the Franco-English Maritime Transport Executive in London. After the Fall of France in June 1940, Worms took responsibility for transferring the French merchant fleet to Britain, and on 4 July 1940 signed what was called the "Accords Worms". He then returned to France via Portugal and Spain, and reported to Admiral Darlan in Vichy. The French ordinance of 18 October 1940 placed companies, whose leaders were not considered true Aryans, under state control. Although Michel Goudchaux at once resigned from his position as associate manager, and although Hypolite Worms was born of a Christian mother and had been baptized at birth, Worms & Cie was placed under state supervision. Olivier de Sèze of the Bank of France was made provisional administrator and a German banker was appointed to the board. Hypolite Worms became the target of violent attacks in the pro-German press.

While part of Worms & Cie was installed provisionally in Nantes, the banking services department continued to operate in Paris with a small staff under the leadership of Gabriel Le Roy Ladurie, as director, and Raymond Meynial, as deputy director. Le Roy Ladurie, who spoke perfect German, was responsible for relations with the German Commissioner. On 1 November 1940, an agency of the banking services department was set up in Marseille to serve the Free Zone. In 1941 the banking services division opened an agency in Algiers, which grew rapidly and continued to operate successfully after Operation Torch in November 1942, when the Allies landed in North Africa. The main branch of banking services in Paris continued to provide financing to French companies for the remainder of the war.

After the liberation of France, the principals of Worms & Cie were investigated for possible collaboration with the Germans. Hypolite Worms and Le Roy Ladurie were arrested on 8 September 1944. They were released on 21 January 1945, and charges dismissed on 25 October 1946. The inquiries found that Worms & Cie Banking Services had only played a small and involuntary role in financing for the Germans. Jacques Barnaud, who had left the company to work for the Vichy government, was held until 20 June 1946, and was not cleared until 26 January 1949. The bank was named as a major influence in the Pacte Synarchique conspiracy theory.

== Post-war period ==
After the war Worms & Cie faced a huge reconstruction task, since much of its shipping fleet had been lost, and its shipyards destroyed. Worms & Cie Banking Services grew rapidly. On 1 July 1946, a branch was opened in Casablanca, Morocco. Banking Services was involved in many financing arrangements in the post-war years. In the 1950s, Banking Services had three agencies, in Marseille, Algiers and Casablanca. Worms et Cie took a large stake in Banque E. Hoskier et Cie, and in 1957–58 acquired Banque de l'Union Lyonnaise, which became the Lyon agency. In 1959 Worms & Cie became one of the main shareholders of the Nederlands Franse Bank NV in Amsterdam. In 1962 Worms & Cie bought Banque Coppenolle in Lille, and this became the Lille agency in June 1965.

== Independent bank ==
In 1964 it was decided to separate the Banking Services from the Worms & Cie partnership. Banque Worms & Cie was launched on 31 December 1964. Worms & Cie was now purely a holding company, owning three independent companies involved in ship building, maritime and coal services, and banking. In September 1965, an agency named Permal International Inc. was established in New York. In June 1966, Worms & Cie signed a cooperation agreement with Paribas that lead to the Paribas subsidiary Banque Foncière du Maroc and the Banque Ottomane Maroc concentrating their banking activities with Worms & Cie (Maroc). A cooperation agreement was signed with Crédit du Nord in December 1966.

On 30 March 1967, the Banque Worms & Cie general partnership become Banque Worms SA, a public limited liability company with Raymond Meynial as chairman and Robert Dubost as general manager. In April 1970, Crédit du Nord and Banque Worms took cross-shareholdings. Louis de Fouchier, president of Crédit du Nord, sat on the board of Banque Worms and Robert Dubost sat on the board of the Crédit du Nord. On 17 April 1967, the Bank of London and South America (BOLSA) and the Bank of Scotland acquired a 10% stake in Banque Worms. Meynial arranged to merge Sofibanque-Hoskier and the Banque Industrielle de Financement et de Crédit (BIFC) with Banque Worms effective retroactively to 1 January 1967. Capital was increased and new shares were purchased by Bolsa, Bank of Scotland, and the Hessische Landesbank Girozentrale.

Banque Worms now had agencies in Marseilles, Lyon, Lille, Le Havre, Montpellier, Nice and Toulouse. A subsidiary, Société Méditerranéenne de Banque, was located in Ajaccio and Bastia. The North African subsidiary, Worms and Cie-Maroc, joined forces with the Banque industrielle de l'Algérie et de la Méditerranée (BIAM) in Algiers and the Banque d'Escompte et de Crédit à L'industrie (BECI) in Tunis. The Philadelphia National Bank acquired just over 7% of the capital of Banque Worms as of 27 June 1968.

Reciprocal arrangements were made with Crédit Industriel et Commerce and its entire group, Crédit Commercial de France, Crédit du Nord and the Banque de l'Union Parisienne allowing Banque Worms customers to make withdrawals from branches of these banks across France. Banque Worms continued to make investments in areas such as real estate finance, canning, oil transport and petrochemicals. In April 1969, the bank established a subsidiary in Geneva, Switzerland, named Banque Worms et Associés (Genève) SA. On 15 December 1970, the bank's shares were floated on the Paris stock exchange. In November 1972, the bank set up Worms UK Limited in London. Guy Taittinger replaced Raymond Meynial as chairman in May 1974.

== Nationalization and later history ==
Banque Worms was nationalized in early 1982 by the French government. At the time Worms & Cie controlled the bank, and owned slightly less than 50%. From 1982 to 1984 Georges Vianès was chief executive officer of Banque Worms. The tax inspector Jean-Michel Bloch-Lainé was president of Banque Worms from 1984 to 1992, and engaged the bank in financing real estate.

In April 1989, Banque Worms mistakenly received about $2,000,000 from a debtor but refused to consent to a return of the fund. The case was litigated up to the Court of Appeals of New York and was closed in 1991 in Banque Worms v. Bankamerica International.

The Union des Assurances de Paris (UAP) was privatized in 1994. The UAP acquired the bank as part of the privatization, which proved to be a disaster due to the catastrophic real estate investments. In 1997 the AXA insurance group acquired UAP and the bank. In 1999 the bank had 1,170 employees with 16 branches in France, including three in Paris. It served medium-sized and large companies, institutions, and wealthy private clients, who accounted for 20% of the business. Services included business cycle financing, asset management and financial advice.

In October 2000, it was reported that Deutsche Bank was in talks with AXA to acquire the bank. Deutsche Bank would get a network of 17 branches with 15,000 private customers and 2,000 business customers. Assets under management amounted to €7.5 billion. The US-based subsidiary Banque Worms Capital Corp. was acquired by Deutsche Bank on 24 October 2000. In February 2001 the AXA Group confirmed that it had sold its wholly owned subsidiary Banque Worms to Deutsche Bank. The sale was due to be completed before 15 April 2001. The acquisition was completed on 2 April 2001. In 2003 the bank lost €35.47 million. The 13 branches of the bank were sold to HSBC's subsidiary Crédit Commercial de France. In April 2004, it was reported that Banque Worms, a subsidiary of Deutsche Bank, would become Licorne Extinction Gestion Initiative Réalisation with the purpose of managing, transferring and liquidating all its assets.

== See also ==
- List of banks in France

== Sources ==
- "AXA Confirms Banque Worms Sale to Deutsche Bank", Insurance Journal, Wells Media Group, 7 February 2001
- Banque Worms, S.A. v. Messrs. Worms et Cie (PDF), United States District Court, S.D. New York, 11 June 1987
- "Banque Worms va disparaître", Les Echos, 26 April 2004
- Brusset, Olivier (1 April 2000), Banque Worms vers une gestion patrimoniale globale (in French)
- Company Overview of Banque Worms Capital Corp., Bloomberg, 24 July 2017
- "Deutsche Bank achète la Banque Worms à Axa", La Tribune (in French), 2001
- "Deutsche Bank rachète la Banque Worms", Liberation, 4 April 2001
- "Jean-Michel Bloch-Lainé Président de la banque Worms (1984–1992)", Le Point (in French), 26 January 2007
- Ley, Francis (10 April 1978), Historique de la Banque Worms (1928–1978)
- Mission de concertation et de proposition sur le régime linguistique dans le système du brevet européen (in French), Ministère de l'Économie, des Finances et de l'Emploi, 26 March 2001
- "Privatisations: L'UAP a rapporté 19 milliards de FF", l'Economiste (in French), 12 April 1994
- Tagliabue, John (25 October 2000), "World Business Briefing: Europe; Banque Worms Acquisition Talks", The New York Times
