= Art. 23 1/15, Art. 23 2/15 and Art. 23 1/16 =

Art. 23 1/15
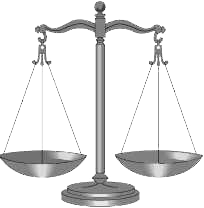
- EPO Enlarged Board of Appeal

Submitted 31 June 2015 Decided 17 September 2015
- Full case name: Administrative Council v. Respondent
- Case: Art. 23 1/15 (also referred to as: G 2301/15)
- ECLI: ECLI:EP:BA:2015:G230115.20150917
- Chamber: Enlarged Board of Appeal
- Language of proceedings: English

Ruling
- Request for a proposal of removal from Office: "Article 12a(5) RPEBA requires that the request under Article 12a(1) RPEBA specify individual incidents and the evidence for them, and give reasons why they constitute a serious ground within the meaning of Article 23(1) EPC."

Court composition
- President; I. Beckedorf
- Judges: K. Klett; A. Dimitrova; M.-B. Tardo-Dino; E. Dufresne; U. Oswald; H. Meinders

Art. 23 2/15
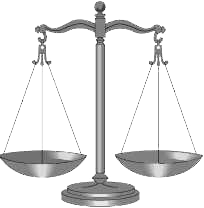
- EPO Enlarged Board of Appeal

Submitted 26 October 2015 Decided 11 February 2016
- Full case name: Administrative Council v. Respondent
- Case: Art. 23 2/15 (also referred to as: G 2302/15)
- ECLI: ECLI:EP:BA:2016:G230215.20160211
- Chamber: Enlarged Board of Appeal
- Language of proceedings: English

Ruling
- Request for a proposal of removal from Office: "Case terminated by withdrawal of the request from the Administrative Council. Reimbursement of all respondent's procedural costs proposed, as well as publication"

Court composition
- President; M.-B. Tardo-Dino
- Judges: K. Klett; A. Dimitrova; E. Dufresne; R. Moufang; U. Oswald; H. Meinders

Art. 23 1/16
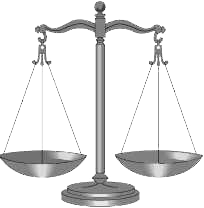
- EPO Enlarged Board of Appeal

Submitted 11 February 2016 Decided 14 June 2016
- Full case name: Administrative Council v. Respondent
- Case: Art. 23 1/16 (also referred to as: G 2301/16)
- ECLI: ECLI:EP:BA:2016:G230116.20160614
- Chamber: Enlarged Board of Appeal
- Language of proceedings: English

Ruling
- Request for a proposal of removal from Office: "Decision not to propose removal from office after threat by president of the European Patent Office to the Enlarged Board of Appeal; which the Administrative Council did not sufficiently distance itself of."

Court composition
- President; M.-B. Tardo-Dino
- Judges: E. Liiv; A. Dimitrova; I. Beckedorf; D. Rogers; U. Oswald; H. Meinders

Art. 23 1/15 (also referred to as G 2301/15), Art. 23 2/15 (also referred to as G 2302/15) and Art. 23 1/16 (also referred to as G 2301/16) are three related cases decided by the Enlarged Board of Appeal of the European Patent Office concerning the removal from office of Patrick Corcoran, a member of the Boards of Appeal, who had been previously suspended by the Administrative Council of the European Patent Organisation. According to Article 23(1) EPC, members of the Boards of Appeal may only be removed from office by the Administrative Council on a proposal from the Enlarged Board of Appeal. Two cases were successively initiated by the Administrative Council, but the Enlarged Board eventually dismissed both of them. In the third case initiated by the Administrative Council, the Enlarged Board decided not to propose the removal from office of Corcoran.

== Background ==
The European Patent Convention (EPC) is a multilateral treaty instituting the legal system according to which European patents are granted. It contains provisions allowing a party to appeal a decision issued by a first instance department of the European Patent Office (EPO). The appeal procedure is under the responsibility of its Boards of Appeal, which are institutionally independent within the EPO. According to Robin Jacob, the members of the Boards of Appeal are "judges in all but name".

The members of the Boards of Appeal are appointed by the Administrative Council of the European Patent Organisation on a proposal from the President of the European Patent Office (EPO). The Administrative Council exercises disciplinary authority over the board members and, during their five-year term, the board members may only be removed from office "if there are serious grounds for such removal and if the Administrative Council, on a proposal from the Enlarged Board of Appeal, takes a decision to this effect." The Administrative Council is also the appointing and disciplinary authority for the President of the EPO.

Further, employees of the EPO, no matter whether they are members of the Boards of Appeal, may apply to the Administrative Tribunal of the International Labour Organization (ILO) to resolve employment disputes they may have with the European Patent Organisation.

== Precursory events ==
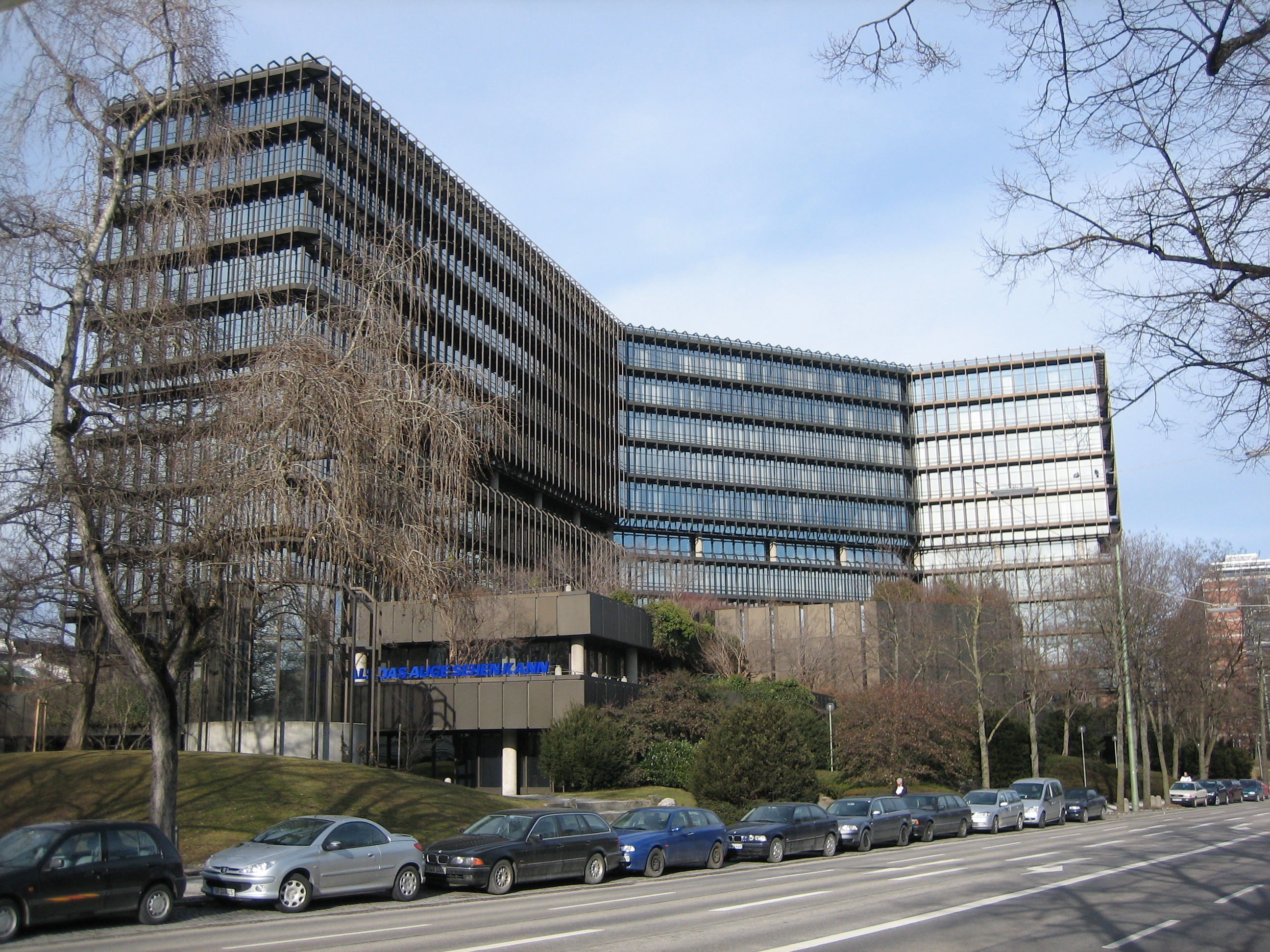
EPO headquarters in Munich, Germany

On 3 December 2014, Patrick Corcoran, an Irish member of Board of Appeal 3.5.05, "was escorted out of the [European Patent] Office by [EPO's] investigation unit," and Benoît Battistelli, president of the EPO, imposed a "house ban" on him. (Note: According to the Enlarged Board in its decision Art. 23 1/16, Summary of Facts and Submissions, point VI, the President of the EPO also ordered his suspension on 3 December 2014.) In reaction, a number of members of the Enlarged Board of Appeal, the highest body of the EPO judiciary, wrote to the Administrative Council to express their concerns over this move, regarded as challenging the judicial independence of the Boards of Appeal. Battistelli stated that he acted "in accordance with the rules at all times" and that he was "absolutely committed to the independence of the [EPO's] judiciary".

The Administrative Council of the European Patent Organisation then suspended Corcoran. (Note: The Enlarged Board regards the Administrative Council's move on 11 December 2014 as a decision "to confirm the suspension of [Corcoran]" (decision Art. 23 1/16, Summary of Facts and Submissions, point VII).) The decision (Note: The Administrative Council decision CA/D 12/14 of 11 December 2014, as explained in ILO Judgment No. 3958, p. 2.) was taken at the Administrative Council's meeting held on 10 and 11 December 2014 in Munich, Germany. The suspension is unique in the history of the EPO. Corcoran was originally suspended until 31 March 2015, for alleged misconduct "[a]s a precautionary and conservative measure" pending an investigation of the matter. According to the French newspaper Les Échos, Corcoran was accused of having launched a smear campaign against Željko Topić, one of the Vice-Presidents of the EPO. The Irish Times later reported that Corcoran had been suspended for defamatory statements he allegedly made against Battistelli using a pseudonym, and for bringing "weapons and Nazi memorabilia to work".

After the suspension of Corcoran, the Rules of Procedure of the Enlarged Board of Appeal (RPEBA) were amended by decision of 25 March 2015 (CA/D 3/15) to implement a procedure for Article 23(1) proceedings, and to fill a legislative lacuna in that respect. A new Article 12a RPEBA provides for that the Administrative Council or the Vice President of EPO in charge of the Boards of Appeal may request that the Enlarged Board of Appeal make a proposal to the Administrative Council for the removal from office of a board member.

== Proceedings and decisions ==
=== June–September 2015: first case (Art. 23 1/15) ===
Following an internal investigation, the Administrative Council requested on 25 June 2015 the Enlarged Board of Appeal to make a proposal for the removal from office of Corcoran, pursuant to Article 23(1) EPC and Article 12a of the Rules of Procedure of the Enlarged Board of Appeal. This was the first dismissal procedure instituted against a member of the Boards of Appeal in the history of the European Patent Office.

In that first case, which received the case number "Art. 23 1/15" (also referred to as "G 2301/15"), the Administrative Council sent data which it said were sufficient evidence. In its decision issued in September 2015, the Enlarged Board indicated that the Council however failed to make a statement regarding the facts which should lead to removal from office, or give arguments why the evidence should lead to removal. The Enlarged Board thus dismissed the case. Namely, the Administrative Council's request for a proposal that Corcoran be removed from office was rejected as inadmissible.

=== October 2015–February 2016: second case (Art. 23 2/15) ===
A second case, which received the case number "Art. 23 2/15" (also referred to as "G 2302/15"), was then initiated on 26 October 2015 and subsequently withdrawn by the Administrative Council. The Enlarged Board thus dismissed the case. It also ordered publication of the decision and proposed reimbursement of legal costs by the defendant.

=== February–June 2016: third case (Art. 23 1/16) ===
A third case, which received case number "Art. 23 1/16" (also referred to as "G 2301/16"), contained a redrafted request from the Administrative Council asking for a proposal for the removal of Corcoran. During first non-public oral proceedings held on 10 to 12 May 2016, the Enlarged Board of Appeal held that the Administrative Council's request was formally admissible for discussion as to its merits, unlike the first request filed in case Art. 23 1/15. The Enlarged Board also decided that public oral proceedings would be held in June 2016, in order to discuss the merits of the case. However, shortly before the scheduled oral proceedings, the Enlarged Board received a letter from the president of the EPO, who was not a party to the proceedings, indicating that he considered the planned public oral hearing and the hearing of witnesses from the Office as "unlawful". Following this intervention from the president of the EPO, the Enlarged Board considered that it could only proceed further with the proceedings if the chairman of the Administrative Council (the "petitioner" that started the proceedings, and appointing authority of the president) distanced himself from the letter. The Administrative Council replied, but the Enlarged Board deemed that the Administrative Council did not do so satisfactorily. The Board thus decided not to request removal from office of the defendant, i.e. Corcoran, without deciding on the substantive allegations made against him.

== Subsequent developments ==
=== Non-renewal of term of office ===
In 2017, the Administrative Council did not renew Corcoran's term of office.

=== ILO Administrative Tribunal decisions 3958 and 3960 ===
On 6 December 2017, the Administrative Tribunal of the International Labour Organization (ILO) issued two decisions, i.e. judgments 3958 and 3960, in which the Tribunal largely sided with Corcoran in ordering his immediate reinstatement in his position as well as monetary compensations to be paid to cover lost wages, legal costs and “moral damages”. Corcoran had filed complaints with the ILO Administrative Tribunal against his suspension. The Tribunal held that Battistelli, the President of the EPO, should not have played a decisive role in the suspension proceedings since he was the subject of the alleged defamation by Corcoran. That is, the Tribunal held that Battistelli had acted in a partial manner, had a conflict of interest, and "had improperly involved himself in the decision to suspend [Corcoran]".

=== Lifting of "house ban", and further ILO decisions ===
The "house ban" issued in December 2014 was later lifted on 11 December 2017, and Corcoran resumed his work as member of the Boards of Appeal. However, as his five-year term as member of the Boards of Appeal was not renewed by the Administrative Council, he returned to work at the EPO first-instance departments in January 2018. He was then reportedly transferred from Munich, Germany, to the EPO branch in The Hague, Netherlands, and assigned to a position outside his area of expertise. In the meantime, the Administrative Tribunal of the International Labour Organization (ILO) issued two further decisions, i.e. judgments 3959 and 3961, dismissing Corcoran's complaints relating to the confiscation of his USB memory stick by the EPO Investigative Unit on 3 December 2014, and to his "request that the Administrative Council [of the European Patent Organisation] investigate the alleged unauthorized disclosure of confidential information relating to the ongoing disciplinary procedure against him".

=== Criminal proceedings ===
In 2018, it was revealed that Benoît Battistelli, then President of the EPO, and Željko Topić, one of EPO Vice-Presidents, had initiated criminal proceedings against Corcoran before courts in Munich. These proceedings eventually resulted in the Regional Court I of Munich (German: Landgericht München I) declaring in November 2017, on appeal, Corcoran innocent of all charges, including the alleged defamation.

== Reception ==
In October 2015, Siegfried Broß, a former judge of the German Federal Constitutional Court and the Patent Division of the Federal Court of Justice, expressed the opinion that the procedure followed by the President and the Administrative Council did not comply with the rule of law and had been conducted in a manner comparable to criminal proceedings, and that confidentiality requirements had not been adhered to. He furthermore criticized the role of EPO's internal investigation unit. EPO Vice-President Raimund Lutz strongly rejected these criticisms, stating that the disciplinary proceedings against the board member were conducted by the EPO and the Administrative Council in accordance with the EPC provisions.

The case has fueled the discussion about the lack of sufficient independence of the Boards of Appeal from the executive branch of the European Patent Office, and the shortcomings of the Administrative Tribunal of the International Labour Organization (ILO) in effectively resolving employment disputes within the EPO. It has also been cited as an example of what can go wrong in supranational organizations.

== See also ==
- R 19/12, decision issued in 2014 by the Enlarged Board of Appeal of the EPO, in which the Enlarged Board allowed an objection of suspicion of partiality against its Chairman
