= Gaétan de Rassenfosse =

Belgian economist (born 1983)

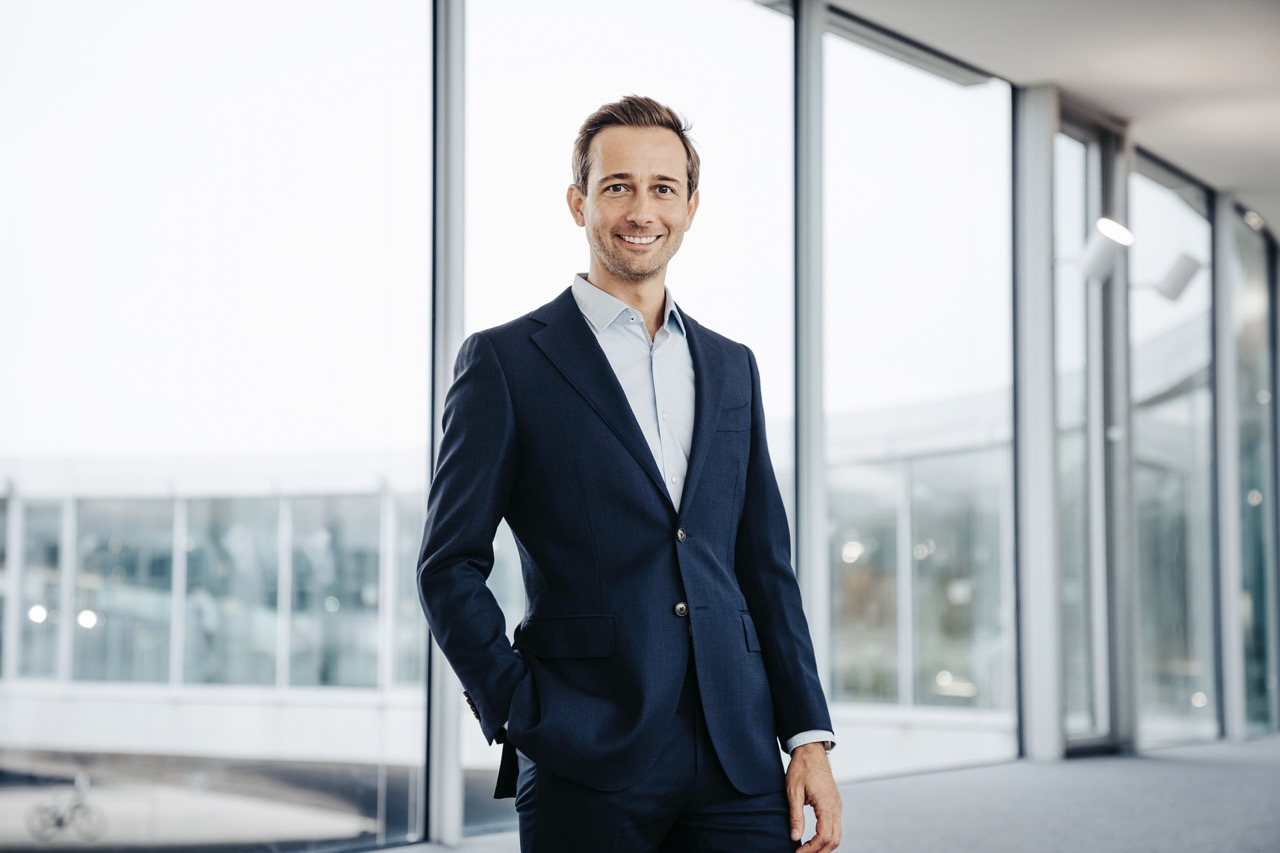
- Gaétan de Rassenfosse in 2025
- Born: 1983 (age 42–43); Anderlecht, Belgium

Academic background
- Education: Economics
- Alma mater: Université libre de Bruxelles
- Thesis: Essays on the propensity to patent: measurement and determinants (2010)
- Doctoral advisor: Bruno van Pottelsberghe

Academic work
- Discipline: Economics
- Sub-discipline: Intellectual property
- Institutions: École Polytechnique Fédérale de Lausanne (EPFL)
- Main interests: Intellectual property Patents; Economics of innovation Science policy
- Website: https://www.epfl.ch/labs/iipp/

Gaétan de Rassenfosse (born 1983 in Anderlecht, Belgium) is a Belgian economist, whose research is specialized in the field of economics of innovation. He is an associate professor at EPFL (École Polytechnique Fédérale de Lausanne), where he heads the Science, Technology and Innovation Policy Laboratory at the College of Management of Technology.

He served as a scientific advisory board member of the Observatoire des Sciences et Techniques at the Haut Conseil de l'évaluation de la recherche et de l'enseignement supérieur in Paris, France. He was a co-editor at the Journal of Economics & Management Strategy.

He was a Post-Doc Research Fellow at the University of Melbourne in Australia.

== Education and career ==
de Rassenfosse graduated in 2006 as an Ingénieur de gestion from Solvay Brussels School of Economics and Management at Université libre de Bruxelles. He subsequently joined Bruno van Pottelsberghe to pursue a Ph.D. in economics at Université libre de Bruxelles. In his Ph.D. thesis he was able to provide empirical evidence on the price elasticity of the demand for patents. After receiving his Ph.D. in 2010 de Rassenfosse joined the University of Melbourne as a research fellow, where he developed a novel way to count patents that has since been adopted by institutions such as the National Science Foundation.

He started as an assistant professor in the economics of innovation at EPFL in 2014 and was promoted to associate professor in 2022. He is the director of the Science, Technology and Innovation Policy Laboratory at the College of Management of Technology.

== Research ==
de Rassenfosse's laboratory performs empirical economic research in the following areas: intellectual property, patents, economics of innovation and science policy. His laboratory has documented the discrimination against foreigners in the patent system and has engaged in the production of open source data.

In 2024, de Rassenfosse co-led, alongside Adam B. Jaffe, a study commissioned by the U.S. Patent and Trademark Office on the agency's fee structure. The study, mandated by the Unleashing American Innovators Act of 2022 (UAIA), was submitted to Congress in December 2024.

The laboratory's research was featured in various news outlets such as RTS, Le Temps, Radio Canada and France Culture.

de Rassenfosse received the International Geneva Award 2019 by the Swiss Network for International Studies (SNIS), the McKinsey & Company Scientific Award 2010 and the CeFIP Academic Award 2008.

de Rassenfosse's research focuses on empirical analysis of innovation systems, intellectual property rights (IPR), patent systems, and science, technology & innovation (STI) policy, often utilising large‐scale patent and innovation data sets.

His work has investigated topics such as the price elasticity of demand for patents; for example, his early article "On the price elasticity of demand for patents" examined how patent filing responds to fee changes.

He has also contributed to the measurement of inventive activity via large‐scale patent counts, for instance, "The worldwide count of priority patents: A new indicator of inventive activity". More recent streams of his research address patent quality and examiner behaviour (e.g., "Low‐quality patents in the eye of the beholder: Evidence from multiple examiners"), the commercialisation of inventions (e.g., "A new approach to measuring invention commercialization: An application to the SBIR program"), and the effects of innovation procurement by governments (e.g., "Buyers' role in innovation procurement: Evidence from U.S. military R&D contracts").

Additionally, he explores how global science, innovation and patent systems respond to geopolitical and institutional factors, including studies of technology protectionism (e.g., "Technology Protectionism and the Patent System: Evidence from China") and the impact of war on research (e.g., "The effect of war on Ukrainian research").

His empirical approach emphasises rigorous econometric methods, open data for patent statistics (such as geocoding of worldwide patent data), and policy‐relevant insights for innovation governance.

Among de Rassenfosse's recent works is a widely cited study on the impact of the war in Ukraine on the country's scientific workforce. In "The Effects of War on Ukrainian Research" (2023), published in Nature's Humanities and Social Sciences Communications, he and his co-authors analyzed survey responses from more than 2,500 Ukrainian scientists to quantify how the Russian large-scale invasion affected research capacity. The study reported that approximately 18.5% of Ukrainian researchers had left the country since February 2022, with many leaving the scientific profession altogether, while a further 15% of those who remained in Ukraine were no longer engaged in scientific work. The authors also found significant reductions in time spent on research, with average weekly research hours declining by about 26%. The findings highlighted the risk of a "lost generation" of Ukrainian scientists, particularly as many who relocated abroad held only short-term or precarious academic positions. The study has been noted as one of the first systematic assessments of the war's effects on a national research system.

== Selected works ==
- Rassenfosse, Gaétan de; Potterie, Bruno van Pottelsberghe de la (2012). "On the Price Elasticity of Demand for Patents" (PDF). Oxford Bulletin of Economics and Statistics. 74: 58–77. doi:10.1111/j.1468-0084.2011.00638.x. S2CID 43660064.
- de Rassenfosse, Gaétan; Dernis, Hélène; Guellec, Dominique; Picci, Lucio; Van Pottelsberghe de la Potterie, Bruno (2013). "The worldwide count of priority patents: A new indicator of inventive activity" (PDF). Research Policy. 42 (3): 720–737. doi:10.1016/j.respol.2012.11.002.
- de Rassenfosse, Gaétan; Jensen, Paul H.; Julius, T'Mir; Palangkaraya, Alfons; Webster, Elizabeth (2019). "Are Foreigners Treated Equally under the Trade-Related Aspects of Intellectual Property Rights Agreement?". The Journal of Law and Economics. 62 (4): 663–685. doi:10.1086/705801. S2CID 214094523.
- de Rassenfosse, Gaétan; Jaffe, Adam; Raiteri, Emilio (2019). "The procurement of innovation by the U.S. Government". PLOS ONE. 14 (8) e0218927. Bibcode:2019PLoSO..1418927D. doi:10.1371/journal.pone.0218927. PMC 6690509. PMID 31404070.
- de Rassenfosse, Gaétan; Fischer, Timo (2016). "Venture Debt Financing: Determinants of the Lending Decision". Strategic Entrepreneurship Journal. 10 (3): 235–256. doi:10.1002/sej.1220.
- de Rassenfosse, Gaétan; Palangkaraya, Alfons; Webster, Elizabeth (2016). "Why do patents facilitate trade in technology? Testing the disclosure and appropriation effects" (PDF). Research Policy. 45 (7): 1326–1336. doi:10.1016/j.respol.2016.03.017.
- de Rassenfosse, Gaétan; Jaffe, Adam B. (2018). "Econometric evidence on the depreciation of innovations". European Economic Review. 101: 625–642. doi:10.1016/j.euroecorev.2017.11.005.
- Verluise, Cyril; Cristelli, Gabriele; Higham, Kyle; de Rassenfosse, Gaétan (2025). "Beyond the front page: In-text citations to patents as traces of inventor knowledge". Strategic Management Journal. doi:10.1002/smj.70027. ISSN 1097-0266.
