= Hypolite Worms =

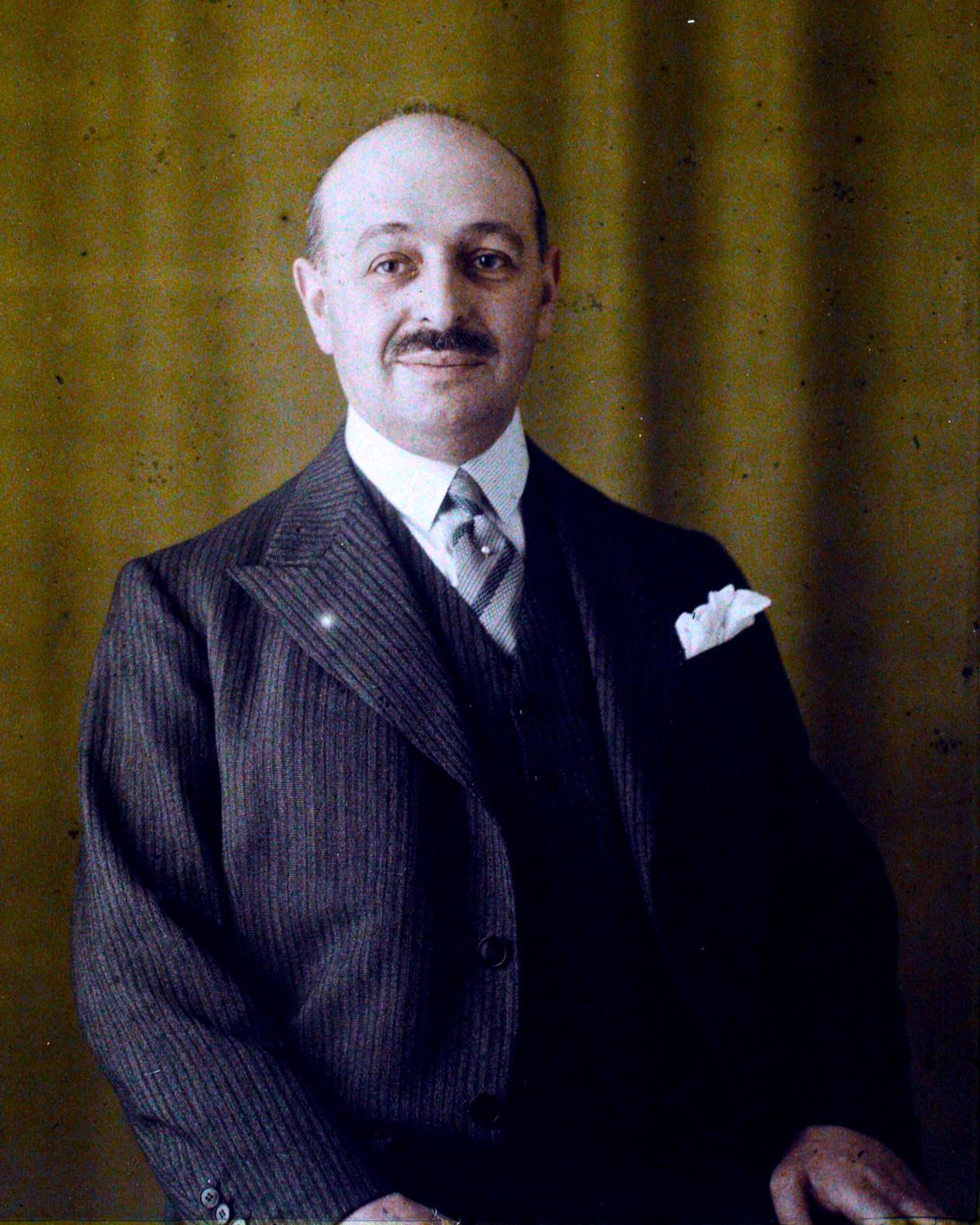
- 1930 Autochrome by Georges Chevalier
- Born: 26 May 1889; Paris, France
- Died: 28 January 1962 (aged 72)
- Occupations: Businessman, banker

Hypolite Worms, or Hippolyte Worms (26 May 1889 – 28 January 1962) was a French businessman who inherited an interest in Worms et Cie, a major operator in the coal trade and in merchant shipping. He expanded the firm into shipbuilding and merchant banking and founded Banque Worms.

== Family ==
The grandfather of Hypolite Worms, also called Hypolite Worms (1801 – 1877), was from a Jewish merchant family from Sarrelouis. He married Sephora Goudchaux, daughter of a banking family from Lorraine. In 1848, he started to import coal to Rouen and Dieppe from Cardiff and Newcastle, and by 1851, he was said to be the largest importer of English coal in France. He bought his first ships in 1855 and, in the 1860s, set up coaling stations at Port Said and Suez that would become an effective monopoly on the supply of coal to ships using the canal. After he died in 1877, Worms et Cie kept its leading position in the coal trade under various members of the Worms and Goudchaux families and ventured into the petroleum trade.

Hypolite Worms was born on 26 May 1889, in Paris. His parents were Lucien Worms, son of the first Hypolite Worms, and Virginie Houcke. His mother was Christian, and he was baptised. He married Gladys Mary Lewis-Morgan, an Anglican. Their daughter married the son of the English ambassador to Japan. Her son, Nicolas Cleaves-Worms, became managing associate of MM Worms and Co., which remained independent after Banque Worms was nationalized in 1982.

== Early years (1910–39) ==
Hypolite Worms joined Worms et Cie in 1910 at the age of 21. He became a managing partner and effective head of the organization on 1 January 1916. Hypolite Worms continued the coal and shipping businesses but also moved into building ships and banking. In 1928, Worms & Cie had three branches: coal trading, shipping, and shipbuilding. Hypolite Worms decided to found a fourth branch for banking, the Services bancaires (Banking Services). Raymond Poincaré had stabilized the franc on 25 June 1928, and the banking industry was entering what promised to be a prosperous period. Worms was impressed by English merchant banks and developed the banking arm of his company along the same lines. It mostly used its own capital and reserves rather than taking deposits and at first primarily financed other arms of the Worms business, although it soon moved into financing trade. Banking Services began to establish privileged relationships with northern Europe. Gabriel Le Roy Ladurie was appointed head of the department in June 1936. By 1939, Banking Services had solid arrangements with banks in London and New York.

== World War II (1939–45) ==
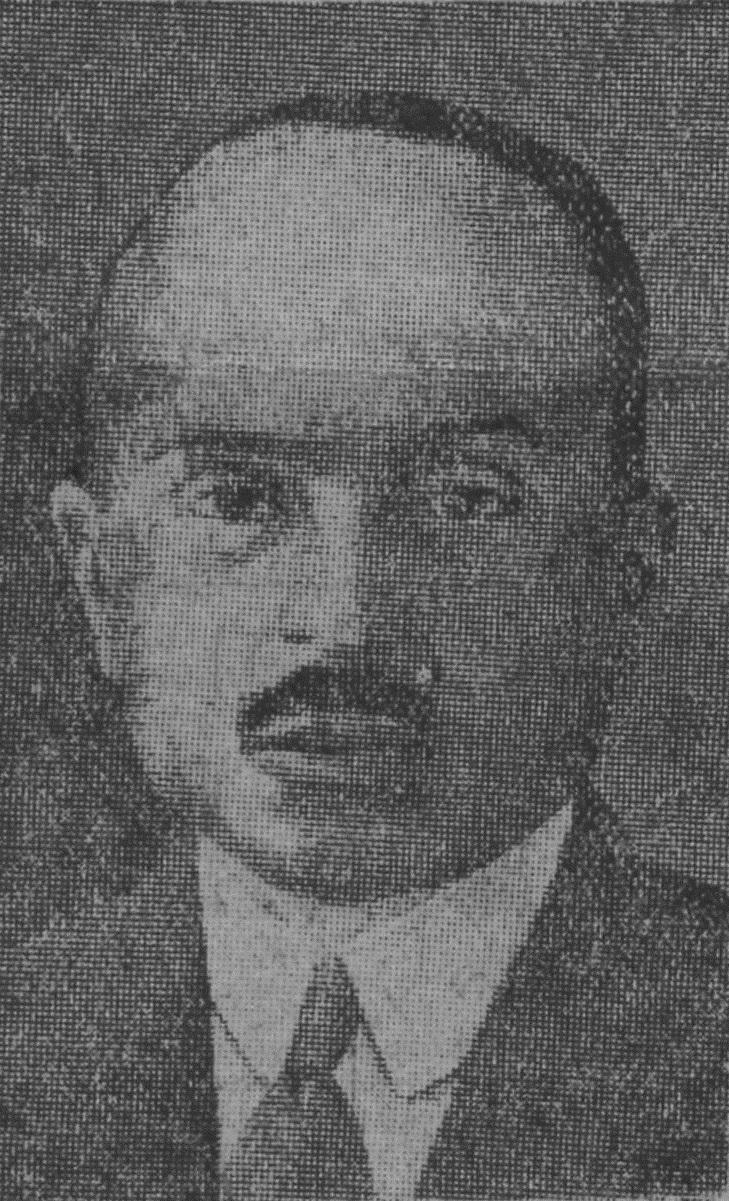
Picture from Paris-soir of 23 October 1940 illustrating an antisemitic and anti-trust article that attacked Worms

After the outbreak of World War II, in November 1939, Hypolite Worms was placed in charge of the French delegation to the Franco-English Maritime Transport Executive in London. After the fall of France in June 1940, he took responsibility for transferring the French merchant fleet to Britain and, on 4 July 1940, signed what was called the "Accords Worms". He then returned to France via Portugal and Spain and reported to Admiral Darlan in Vichy. The French ordinance of 18 October 1940 placed companies whose leaders were not considered true Arians under state control. Although Michel Goudchaux at once resigned from his position as associate manager and although Hypolite Worms was born of a Christian mother and had been baptized at birth, Worms & Cie was placed under state supervision. Olivier de Sèze of the Bank of France was made provisional administrator, and a German banker was appointed to the board. Hypolite Worms became the target of violent attacks in the pro-German press.

== Post-war (1945–62) ==
After the liberation of France, the principals of Worms & Cie were investigated for possible collaboration with the Germans. Hypolite Worms and Le Roy Ladurie were arrested on 8 September 1944. They were released on 21 January 1945, and charges were dismissed on 25 October 1946. The inquiries found that Worms & Cie Banking Services had only played a small and involuntary role in financing the Germans.

Hypolite Worms died on 28 January 1962, at the age of 72.

== Sources ==
- Cassis, Youssef; Cottrell, Philip L. (2015), Private Banking in Europe: Rise, Retreat, and Resurgence, Oxford University Press, ISBN 978-0-19-873575-5
- Coignard, Sophie; Guichard, Marie-Thérèse (2000), French Connections: Networks of Influence, Algora Publishing, ISBN 978-1-892941-02-2
- Guggenheim, Alain, "Hypolite Worms", geneanet (in French), archived from the original on October 4, 2017
- Ley, Francis (10 April 1978), Historique de la Banque Worms (1928-1978)
- Smith, Michael Stephen (2006), The Emergence of Modern Business Enterprise in France, 1800-1930, Harvard University Press, ISBN 978-0-674-01939-3
