= European Intellectual Property Institutes Network =

The European Intellectual Property Institutes Network (EIPIN) is a cooperation network of intellectual property (IP) institutions, organizing conferences. It was founded in 1999. Its aim is "to facilitate and increase cooperation among IP institutions and students in Europe".

Its members are:

- Centre for International Intellectual Property Studies (CEIPI), University of Strasbourg, France
- Magister Lvcentinvs, University of Alicante, Spain
- Queen Mary Intellectual Property Research Institute, London, United Kingdom
- Munich Intellectual Property Law Center (MIPLC), LL.M. Program, Munich, Germany
- Intellectual Property Law and Knowledge Management (IPKM), Maastricht University

== See also ==
- Intellectual property organization
