= Christophe Geiger =

Christophe Geiger is a lecturer in intellectual property law, as well as former Director General of the Centre for International Intellectual Property Studies (CEIPI) at the University of Strasbourg.
