= Albrecht Krieger =

German civil servant

Dr. jur. h. c. Albrecht Krieger (died 2 October 2007 in Berlin, Germany) was a German civil servant who was chairman of the Administrative Council of the European Patent Organisation from October 1987 to 18 October 1990.

In 1946, Albrecht Krieger started studying law at the Friedrich Wilhelm-Universität, now the Humboldt University of Berlin (German: Humboldt-Universität). In 1953, he entered the German Federal Ministry of Justice (German: Bundesministerium der Justiz) and worked there for almost forty years, until 1 May 1990.

== Publications ==
- Die Rechtsungültigkeit des Gebrauchsmuster nach § 9 des Ersten Überleitungsgesetzes, GRUR 1950, 131
- Die Rückgliederung des Saarlandes auf dem Gebiet des gewerblichen Rechtsschutzes, des Wettbewerbsrechts und des Urheberrechts, GRUR 1957, 98 (with Kurt Haertel)
- Kurt Haertel: Ein Leben für den Schutz des geistigen Eigentums, GRUR Int 1990, 654

Positions in intergovernmental organisations
Preceded by Otto Leberl	Chairman of the Administrative Council of the European Patent Organisation; 1987–1990	Succeeded by Jean-Claude Combaldieu
