= Christoph Ernst =

German civil servant

Christoph Ernst is a German civil servant, who was Chairman of the Administrative Council of the European Patent Organisation from 1 October 2017 until October 2018. In October 2018, he was appointed Vice-President of the European Patent Office's (EPO) Directorate-General Legal and International Affairs, starting on 1 January 2019, and he then resigned from his position as Chairman of the Administrative Council.

Positions in intergovernmental organisations
Preceded by Jesper Kongstad	Chairman of the Administrative Council of the European Patent Organisation; 2017–2018	Succeeded by Josef Kratochvíl
