= Alberto Casado Cerviño =

Alberto Casado Cerviño (born 15 October 1952 in Pontevedra, Spain) is a former Director General of the Spanish Patent and Trademark Office. He was appointed to this position on May 24, 2008. From July 1, 2009 to June 30, 2010, he also acted as Chairman ad interim of the Administrative Council of the European Patent Organisation. Previously, from 1994 to 2004, he served as Vice-President of the Office for Harmonization in the Internal Market (OHIM).

In June 2012, Alberto Casado Cerviño was appointed to the position of Vice-President DG 2 ("Directorate-General Operational Support") of the European Patent Office with a mandate for five years.
