= Georges Vianès =

French civil servant, corporate officer and politician

Georges Jean Gabriel Vianès (17 June 1938 - 4 February 2025) was a French civil servant, politician, and corporate officer. He was head of the French National Industrial Property Institute (INPI, standing for Institut national de la propriété industrielle in French), the French national intellectual property office from 1975 to 1982. He was also the first Chairman of the Administrative Council of the European Patent Organisation, from 19 October 1977 to 18 October 1981.

From 1982 to 1984, he was chief executive officer (French: Président directeur général, PDG) of Banque Worms, a French bank. From 1989 to 1991 he was the Head of Administration of the European Organization for Nuclear Research (CERN) in Geneva. From 1995 to 2001, he was mayor of Ferney-Voltaire, a commune in Ain, a département in eastern France. He also held the post of senior counselor at the French Court of Financial Auditors, the Cour des Comptes, ("Conseiller maître à la Cour de Comptes") until his retirement on 18 June 2007.

== Published works ==
- The New French Patent Law, 11 IIC 131, 132 (1980)
- Brevet européen : les enjeux de l'accord de Londres, Secrétariat d'Etat à l'industrie, Paris, 2001, 239 pages (pdf)

Positions in intergovernmental organisations
Preceded by (none)	Chairman of the Administrative Council of the European Patent Organisation; 1977–1981	Succeeded by Ivor J. G. Davis
