= Banque Worms v. Bankamerica International =

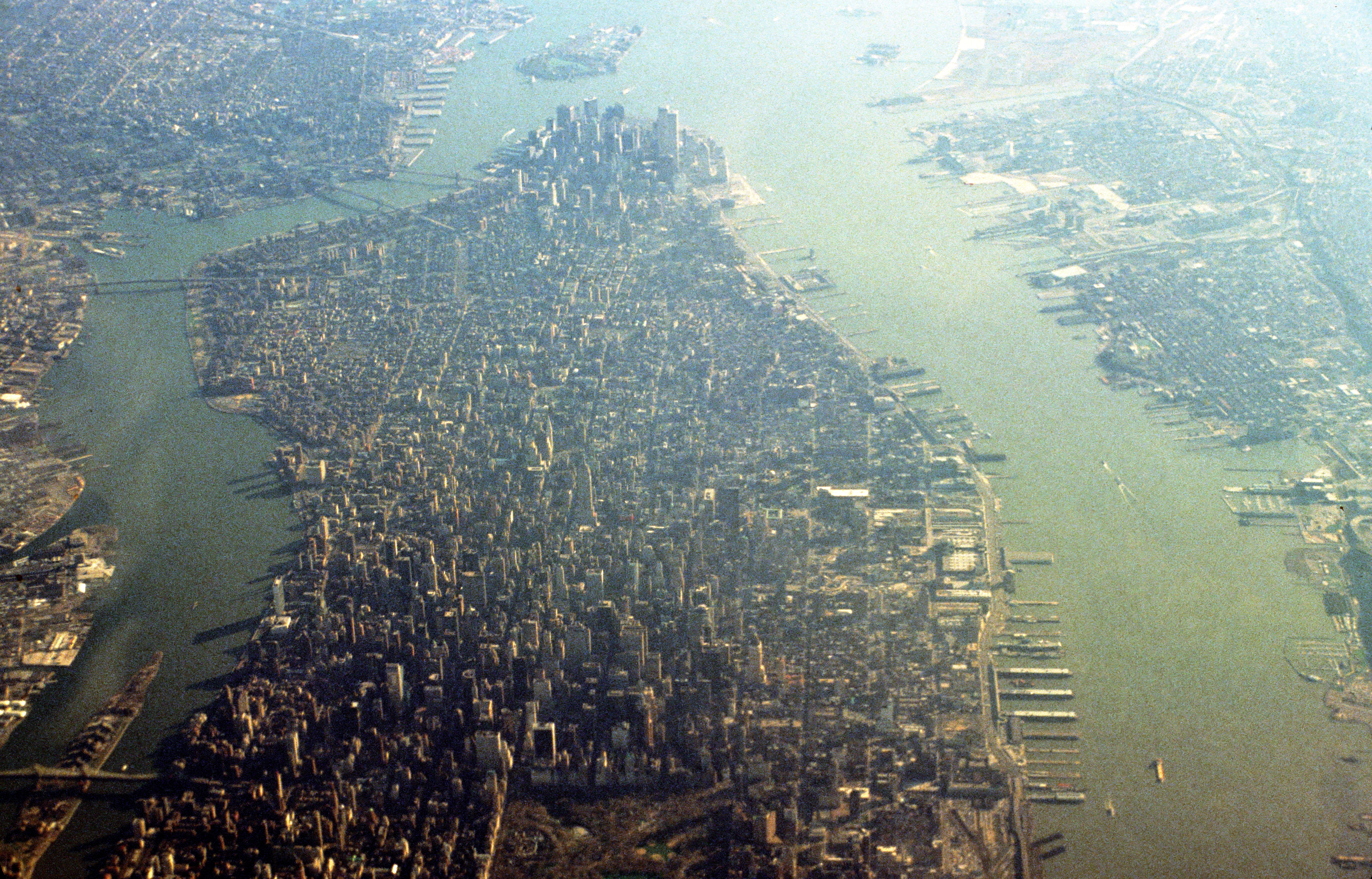
- Court: New York Court of Appeal
- Decided: 12 February 1991

Court membership
- Judge sitting: Fritz W. Alexander II

Keywords
- Debt

Banque Worms v. Bankamerica International is a 1991 case of the New York Court of Appeals. It found that accidental payment for a debt was an irreversible final settlement of the debt, even if the payer did not intend to send the money.

== Facts ==
In April 1989, Australian company Spedley Securities instructed Security Pacific International Bank's New York City office to settle a debt with the French bank Banque Worms totalling $1 974 267.97, but then changed their mind and instructed that the money not be paid. Spedley Securities later went into involuntary liquidation. But Security Pacific staff did not notice the second instruction, and the money was transferred to Banque Worms' account with Bankamerica. A complicated chain of litigation over the money followed.

== Judgment ==
The New York Court of Appeals held that Banque Worms was entitled to the money. It concluded that when a debt is paid, the receiver needs to have the right to expect that the money is theirs permanently, as the receiver "should not have to wonder whether it may retain the funds; rather, such a beneficiary should be able to consider the transfer of funds as a final and complete transaction".

In unrelated cases in Australia over Spedley's collapse, Spedley director Brian Yuill and manager of corporate finance Jamie Craven received prison sentences.

== In re: Citibank August 11, 2020 ==
A related case with an opposite conclusion was decided by the United States Court of Appeals for the Second Circuit in 2022.

In 2020 Citibank, administering a loan received by Revlon, a distressed cosmetics company, was asked to pay back $7.8m to some but not all of Revlon's lenders. The intention was to do this as part of a disputed attempt to restructure the loan in which the lenders who opposed the restructuring would receive nothing. As this was not a standard procedure there was no standardised setting to do this on the bank's software, and its staff accidentally paid off the entire loan, sending the creditors almost $900 million of Citibank's own money.

Judge Jesse Furman of the District Court for the Southern District of New York initially found for the creditors, but the Second Circuit ultimately ruled that the cases were not comparable, concluding there was no expectation that the loan would be completely paid off unexpectedly before it was due. The case led to the adoption of erroneous-payment provisions in syndicated loan agreements, commonly known as "Revlon clauses".
