= Alain Pompidou =

French scientist and politician (1942–2024)

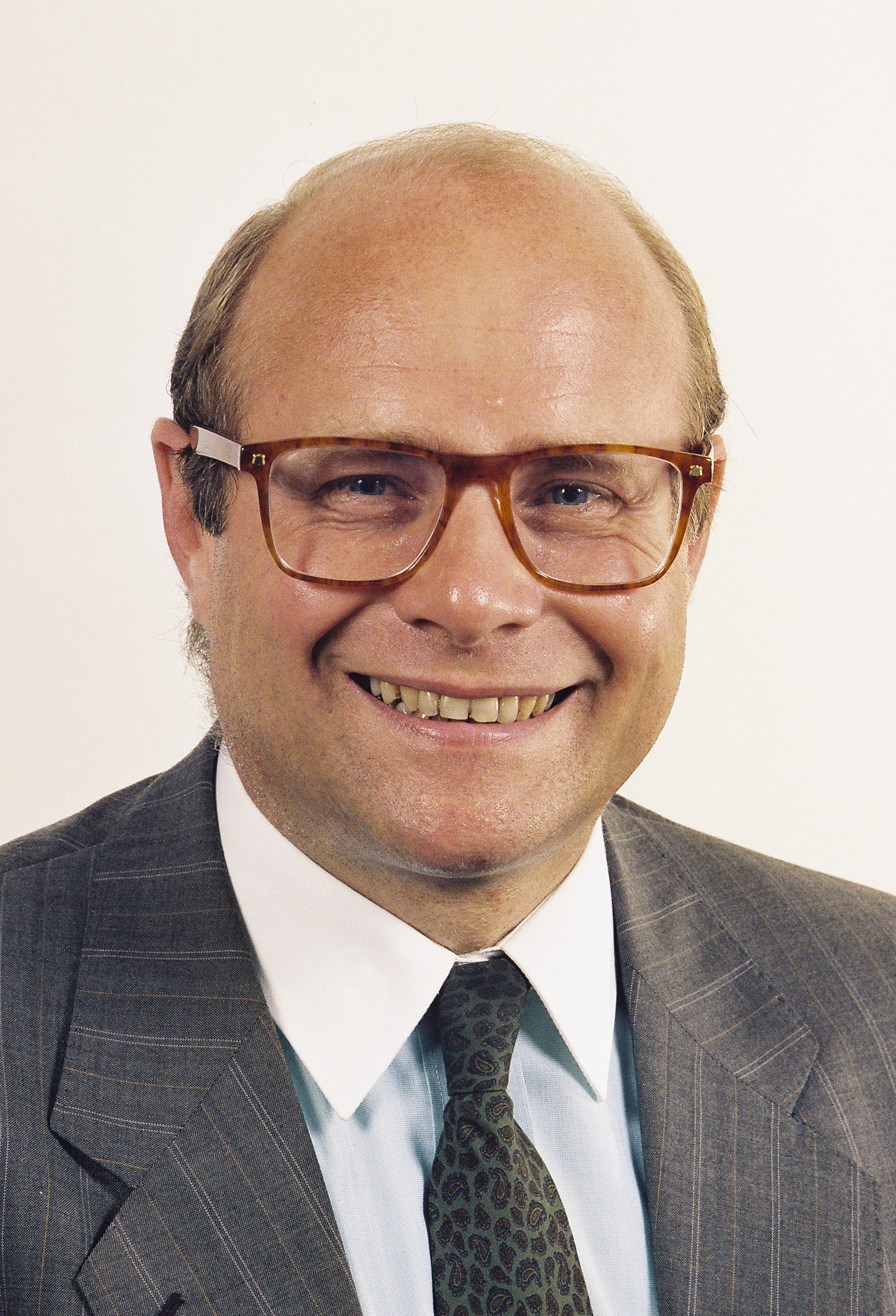
- Official portrait, 1989

Member of the European Parliament
- In office 1989–1999

President of the European Patent Office
- In office 2004–2007
- Preceded by: Ingo Kober
- Succeeded by: Alison Brimelow

Personal details
- Born: Alain Jacques Jean Pompidou; 5 April 1942 Paris, France
- Died: 11 December 2024 (aged 82) Paris, France
- Party: RPR
- Parent(s): Georges Pompidou; Claude Pompidou
- Education: Pierre and Marie Curie University

Alain Pompidou (French: [alɛ̃ pɔ̃pidu]; 5 April 1942 – 11 December 2024) was a French scientist and politician. A professor of histology, embryology, and cytogenetics, he was the fourth president of the European Patent Office (EPO) from 1 July 2004, to 30 June 2007. He was the adopted son of Georges Pompidou, former President of France.

== Biography ==
=== Background ===
Pompidou was born in Paris on 5 April 1942.

=== Professor of histology, embryology and cytogenetics (1974–2004) ===
Pompidou took doctorates in medicine, biology, and science. From 1974 to 2004, he was professor of histology, embryology and cytogenetics in the medical faculty of the University of Paris. Until 2004 he was also director of the laboratory of the Cochin – St Vincent de Paul – La Roche Guyon Hospital in Paris, head of the cytogenetics and pathology department, and chairman of the hospital group's advisory board. He hold tenures at the University of Alabama at Birmingham and at the Memorial Sloan-Kettering Cancer Center in New York.

He was also the author of numerous articles and monographs on science, ethics and society, as well as on biomedical ethics.

=== Advisor for science policy and science ethics ===
Pompidou served on the consultative and scientific committee of numerous national, European and international organisations, including the World Health Organization (WHO), UNESCO and the European Commission.

From 1990 to 2004, he was a member and founder of the French Academy of Technologies.

Between 1986 and 1997 he acted as a special adviser to the French prime minister, the minister of research and higher education and the minister of health.

He was also the author of Souviens-toi de l'homme: l'éthique, la vie, la mort (Payot, Paris, 1990).

Pompidou was rapporteur of the subcommission on ethics of outer space activities of the World Commission on Ethics (COMEST) of the UNESCO, and he became a member, then vice-chair of COMEST in 2004. From 1999 to 2004, he served as a spokesman on research and space policy on the French Economic and Social Council. In 1999, he authored the joint report of UNESCO and the European Space Agency (ESA) about The Ethics of Space Policy.

=== Member of the European Parliament (1989–1999) ===
As a member of the European Parliament from 1989 to 1999, he was particularly concerned with the EU Framework Programmes for Research and Technological Development, with the preparation of the Directive on the legal protection of biotechnological inventions ("gene patent directive"), and with bioethical issues as well as in innovation policy.

From 1994 to 1999 he was president of the European Parliament's Scientific and Technological Options Assessment, as well as President of the "Intergroupe Ciel et Espace Européen".

=== President of the European Patent Office (2004–2007) ===
In 2004, he was elected by the Administrative Council of the EPO as a result of a compromise. Although former presidents of the EPO held their post for at least seven years, Alain Pompidou was president for three years. He was succeeded by Alison Brimelow for an equal term. Alain Pompidou was the first Frenchman to hold the post of President of the EPO.

On 30 June 2004, the day before becoming president of the EPO, he and Albert-Claude Benhamou were granted EP 1358481, filed on 16 March 2001, for a "Device for in situ analysis and/or treatment consisting of a flexible rod and a micro-system fixed at one end of said flexible rod".

As the first president of the EPO with a background that is not specific to intellectual property, his action aimed at making the Organisation more open and at raising awareness about the importance of patent policy, in particular among policy makers.

=== The Saint Vincent de Paul Mortuary ===
Between 1990 and 2004 he was professor in charge of a number of medical services at Saint-Vincent-de-Paul hospital, in Paris, where in 2005 a collection of 351 foetuses and still-born babies was discovered.

The Parquet de Paris (Paris Public Prosecutor's office) found that no violation of French criminal law had taken place. The relevant ministries decided to put the case to the so-called Disciplinary Commission (the competent jurisdiction regarding lecturers and hospital employees of university hospitals) which reprimanded Pompidou. Incurring a reprimand is extremely rare.

=== Death ===
He died on 11 December 2024 in Paris at the age of 82.

== Honours ==
- Officier of the National Order of the Legion of Honour (2011)
- Officer of the Order of National Merit of France (Officer de l'Ordre national du Mérite)
- Chevalier of the Ordre des Palmes Académiques (2002)
- Officier of the Order of Leopold (Belgium - 2018)

== See also ==
- Roland Grossenbacher, former chairman of the Administrative Council of the European Patent Organisation
- Dominique Guellec, former chief economist at the European Patent Office
- Peter Messerli, Vice-President of the European Patent Office, head of the DG Appeals
- Bruno van Pottelsberghe, chief economist at the European Patent Office.

Positions in intergovernmental organisations
Preceded by Ingo Kober	President of the European Patent Office; 2004–2007	Succeeded by Alison Brimelow
