= Sipos =

Sipos, Sipoș or Šipoš may refer to:

== Geography ==
- Sipoș, tributary of the river Vâlcele in Covasna County, Romania
- Sipoș, tributary of the river Olt in Harghita County, Romania

== People ==
Sports

- Adrián Sipos (born 1990), Hungarian handball player
- Anna Sipos (born 1908), Hungarian table tennis player
- Dávid Šípoš (born 1998), Slovak footballer
- Ferenc Sipos (1932–1997), Hungarian footballer and trainer
- Gábor Sipos (born 2002), Hungarian footballer
- Hajnalka Sipos (born 1972), Hungarian footballer
- Leon Šipoš (born 2000), Croatian footballer
- Lilla Sipos (born 1992), Hungarian footballer
- Margit Sipos (born 1908), Hungarian swimmer
- Márton Sipos (1900–1926), Hungarian swimmer
- Norbert Sipos (born 1981), Hungarian footballer
- Vilmos Sipos (1914–1978), Hungarian footballer and manager

Film

- Jessica Sipos, Canadian actress
- László Sipos (1918–1944), Hungarian film producer and director
- Shaun Sipos (born 1981), Canadian actor
- Zsuzsanna Sipos, Hungarian set decorator

Society

- George Sipos, Canadian poet and journalist
- Nora Sipos (1900–1988), New Zealand businesswoman

== See also ==
- Chironius, a genus of snakes commonly called sipos
- Sipo (disambiguation)
