= Centre for International Intellectual Property Studies =

International Centre, Intellectual Property Studies, (1963)

The Centre for International Intellectual Property Studies, or Centre d'Études Internationales de la Propriété Intellectuelle (CEIPI) in French (formerly the "Centre for International Industrial Property Studies", or "Centre d'Études Internationales de la Propriété Industrielle" in French), is a Strasbourg, France-based training centre for specialists in intellectual property law. It was founded in 1963, as part of the University of Strasbourg by Professors Daniel Bastian (law) and Hubert Forestier (chemistry).

The centre is organized in three sections: the French section, the international section, and the research section. The CEIPI is member of the European Intellectual Property Institutes Network (EIPIN). The former General Directors of the CEIPI were Professor Yves Reboul, followed by Christophe Geiger. The current General Directors of the CEIPI is Yann Basire.

== See also ==
- European Patent Convention (EPC)
- European patent law
- Ingo Kober
- Intellectual property organization
- Romuald Singer
- Dieter Stauder
