= Árpád Bogsch =

Hungarian-American international civil servant

- Born: February 24, 1919; Budapest, Hungary
- Died: September 19, 2004 (aged 85); Geneva, Switzerland
- Occupation: Attorney
- Years active: 1942-1997
- Known for: Director General of WIPO
- Notable work: Universal Copyright Convention: An Analysis and Commentary (book)

Árpád Bogsch (February 24, 1919 – September 19, 2004) was a Hungarian-American international civil servant. He was born in Budapest, Hungary, and became an American citizen in 1959. From 1973 to 1997, he was Director General of World Intellectual Property Organization (WIPO). He was also Secretary General of the International Union for the Protection of New Varieties of Plants (UPOV). He died in Geneva, Switzerland.

== WIPO ==
In 1993, Bogsch described China's intellectual property development as unprecedented in the history of intellectual property. China cited Bogsch's statement in responding to U.S. criticism and the dynamic led to growth in the China-WIPO relationship.

== Tributes ==
There have been a number of tributes made in Bogsch's memory. The main building at WIPO headquarters in Geneva is named the "Árpád Bogsch building" in his honor. The Hungarian Intellectual Property Office, in the country of Bogsch's birth, features a bust of Bogsch by sculptor Tibor Borbás. The International Federation of Inventors' Associations established the Árpád Bogsch Memory Medal in 2010, to be awarded to individuals who support invention and innovation in the same spirit as Bogsch.

== Documentary films featuring him ==
Bogsch was featured in the 1988 Swiss documentary film A Szellem Tulajdona (Property of the Intellect), directed by Zoltán Bonta.

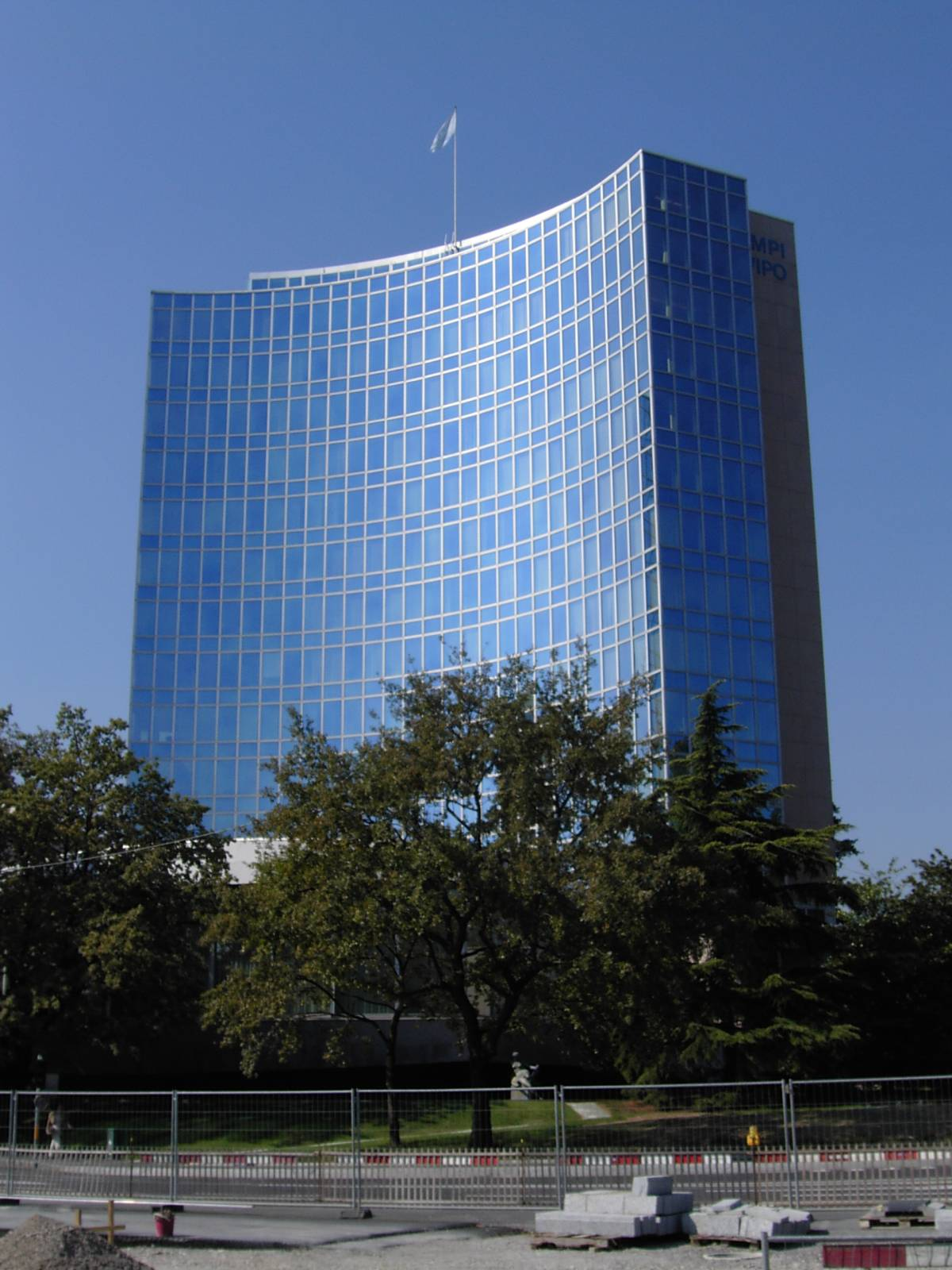
The Árpád Bogsch building

== Notable works ==
- Bogsch, Arpad (1958). Universal Copyright Convention: An Analysis and Commentary. New York: Bowker. LCCN 58-13137. OCLC 902072883. A comprehensive annotation of the Universal Copyright Convention.

Positions in intergovernmental organisations
Preceded by Georg Bodenhausen	Director General of World Intellectual Property Organization (WIPO); 1973–1997	Succeeded by Kamil Idris
