= Makoto Nakajima =

Japanese civil servant

Commissioner of the Japan Patent Office

Personal details
- Born: January 2, 1952 (age 74)
- Education: University of Tokyo
- Profession: Civil servant

Makoto Nakajima (中嶋 誠, Nakajima Makoto; born January 2, 1952) was the commissioner of the Japan Patent Office until he was succeeded by Masahiro Koezuka (肥塚 雅博).

== Government service ==
Upon graduating from the University of Tokyo with a law degree, Nakajima began working in the Ministry of International Trade and Industry in April 1974. In May 1988, the Industrial Organization and Industrial Policy Bureau chief. Later, Nakajima became the director of the Director of the Budget and Accounts Division for the Minister's Secretariat, and eventually served as the director of the MITI's Kansai region branch. In 2004, Nakajima served as the director-general of the Ministry of Economy, Trade and Industry Trade and Economic Cooperation Bureau, until his appointment as commissioner of the Japan Patent Office in 2005.

== Japan Patent Office ==
While serving in the role of commissioner, Nakajima entered into new agreements with the United States Patent and Trademark Office and other patent offices for the Patent Prosecution Highway, a set of rules for fast-tracking patents by sharing information between patent offices in different countries. He also reached a similar agreement with the Korean Intellectual Property Office and the State Intellectual Property Office of the People's Republic of China. Nakajima also took steps to increase efficiency and reduce duplication of work within the Japan Patent Office.

== See also ==
- Shinjiro Ono
