= Josef Kratochvíl (civil servant) =

Josef Kratochvíl is a Czech civil servant and current president of the Industrial Property Office of the Czech Republic. On 12 December 2018 he was elected Chairman of the Administrative Council of the European Patent Organisation, a position he took over on 1 January 2019 for a three-year term.

Positions in intergovernmental organisations
Preceded by Christoph Ernst	Chairman of the Administrative Council of the European Patent Organisation; 2019–present	Incumbent
