= Intellectual Property Watch =

Intellectual property law reader

IP-Watch
- Type: Daily Blogs/Monthly Reporter
- Format: 16 page reporter/online articles
- Editor: William New
- Founded: 2004; 21 years ago
- Political alignment: Neutral
- Headquarters: Geneva, Switzerland
- ISSN: 1661-7355
- Website: www.ip-watch.org

Intellectual Property Watch is a Geneva-based publication reporting on policy issues and influences relating to international organizations (IOs), especially those in Geneva such as the World Intellectual Property Organization, World Trade Organization, World Health Organization and International Telecommunication Union. It also follows policy developments outside Geneva, and does some investigative reporting.

Besides almost daily articles and occasional special columns, a monthly reader is published about intellectual property and the policies that affect it.

IP-Watch is an editorially independent news agency whose startup funding came from several sources, the MacArthur Foundation, the Rockefeller Foundation, and the Open Society Institute. Currently, they accept subscription fees for their Monthly Reporter and a subscriber-only online content area, but do not take anonymous donations nor donations from any private corporations, except in the form of subscriptions to their reporting services. Most of the online content is open access, published under the Creative Commons license.

Intellectual Property Watch has no formal owner, and their board of directors meets twice a year to discuss business and legal matters.

The website openly presents both industry and industry critics in their "Inside Views" section. They also provide interested developing countries with free copies of their newsletter.

The founder and board chair is Carolyn Deere.

== IP-Watch v. USTR ==
IP-Watch, represented by Yale Law School's Media Freedom and Information Access Clinic, is suing the United States Trade Representative to compel disclosure of documents pertaining to the Trans-Pacific Partnership under the Freedom of Information Act.
