= Zoltán Bonta =

Hungarian filmmaker and videographer

Zoltán Bonta (born 8 January 1954, Budapest) is a Hungarian filmmaker and videographer. From 1985 to 1987, he was member of Directory in Béla Balázs Studio (BBS). Since 1979 assistant to Gábor Bódy among other filmdirectors, az Ferenc András, Ferenc Kardos, Sándor Simó, Lajos Koltay, Pál Sándor, János Dömölky, Tamás Sas, Fabio Carpi, Gary Jones, Rakesh Mehra. Collaborating since 2004 with Professor Géza Bethlenfalvy tibetologist, indologist on promoting in books and films the Indian-Hungarian historical and cultural relations. Founder of the Oriental Film Association.
