= Takashi Suzuki (government official) =

Japanese public official (born 1949)

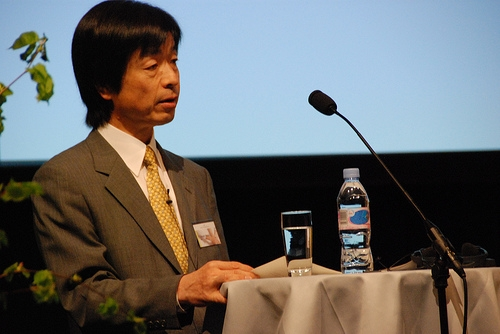
Takashi Suzuki, Commissioner of the Japan Patent Office

Takashi Suzuki (鈴木隆史, Suzuki Takashi; born Tuesday, June 21st, 1949) is a Japanese public official.

Suzuki graduated from Kyoto University and joined the Ministry of International Trade and Industry in 1973. He was appointed General Manager of the Washington office of Japan National Oil Corporation in May 1988, Deputy Director-General of the Agency for Natural Resources and Energy in July 2001, and Director of the Economic and Industrial Policy Bureau in July 2006. He was also Commissioner of the Japan Patent Office from July 2008, but has since stepped down.
