= Shinjiro Ono =

Japanese patent attorney (died 2022)

Deputy Commissioner of the Japan Patent Office
- In office June 2002 – October 2005

Personal details
- Born: 1947/1948
- Died: 3 June 2022 (aged 74)
- Education: Tokyo Metropolitan University
- Profession: Civil servant

Shinjiro Ono (小野 新次郎, Ono Shinjirō; 1947/1948 – 3 June 2022) was the deputy commissioner of the Japan Patent Office from June 2002 until October 2005. He served in numerous positions in the Japan Patent Office and as the First Secretary of the Permanent Mission of Japan in Geneva, Switzerland. Ono worked with a Japanese patent firm.

== Government service ==
=== Japan Patent Office ===
Ono graduated from Tokyo Metropolitan University with a Bachelor of Science from the Department of Industrial Chemistry. Shortly thereafter in April 1970, Ono joined the Japan Patent Office, studying abroad in the United States in 1978 and 1979. In 1998, Ono became the Director-General of the Fourth Examination Department, overseeing chemicals. Ono served as the Director-General of the Appeals Department from 2001 to 2002. In June 2002, Ono was appointed deputy director of the Japan Patent Office, a position he filled until October 2005.

As Deputy Director, Ono attempted to improve the patent examination system to increase examination quality and reduce the time between application and approval. He also advocated the implementation of a patent prosecution highway, and improved communication with foreign patent offices on patents for cutting-edge technology.

=== Diplomacy ===
From 1982 to 1985, Ono served as the First Secretary of the Permanent Mission of Japan in Geneva, Switzerland.

== Post-government work ==
Ono worked for Japanese patent firm Yuasa and Hara. He became a member of the board of advisers for the International Intellectual Property Institute in February 2006.

== See also ==
- Makoto Nakajima
