= State Intellectual Property Office (Croatia) =

- Državni zavod za intelektualno vlasništvo

Agency overview
- Formed: 1991
- Headquarters: Zagreb, Croatia
- Employees: 90 (31 Dec 2018)
- Annual budget: HRK 17.6 million (€2.3 million) (2018)
- Website: www.dziv.hr

The State Intellectual Property Office of the Republic of Croatia (SIPO Croatia; Croatian: Državni zavod za intelektualno vlasništvo) is a government agency responsible for registration of patents, trademarks and design in Croatia. It was established in 1991, originally under the name "Republic Industrial Property Office" and then "State Patent Office". Since 1996, its name is "State Intellectual Property Office."

== List of directors general ==
The following persons have held the office of Director General:

1. Nikola Kopčić (1992 - 2002)
2. Hrvoje Junašević (2002 - 2004)
3. Željko Topić (2004 - 2012)
4. Ljiljana Kuterovac (2012 - )
