= United International Bureaux for the Protection of Intellectual Property =

Former United Nations agency

The United International Bureaux for the Protection of Intellectual Property (BIRPI) was an international organization. It was set up in 1893 to administer the Berne Convention for the Protection of Literary and Artistic Works and the Paris Convention for the Protection of Industrial Property. The BIRPI is the predecessor of the World Intellectual Property Organization (WIPO).

BIRPI is an acronym for Bureaux Internationaux Réunis pour la Protection de la Propriété Intellectuelle (French for "United International Bureaux for the Protection of Intellectual Property").

== History ==
=== 1883 — Paris Convention for the Protection of Industrial Property ===
In 1873, a pressing issue became evident for creators, in that they feared that others would steal their ideas since there was no way to regulate such things. Many exhibitors chose not to attend the International Exhibition of Inventions in Vienna, Austria that year. In 1883, the Paris Convention for the Protection of Industrial Property came about to address this issue, and became the first step in intellectual property protection.

=== 1886 — Berne Convention ===
There were still some gaps in protection after the Paris Convention, so in 1886, there was the Berne Convention for the Protection of Literary and Artistic Works. This meant that creative works, such as music, books, and paintings, were also given protections.

=== 1893 — BIRPI established ===
In 1893, the International Bureau established by the Paris Convention and the International Bureau established by Berne Convention, both to carry out administrative tasks, merged to form the BIRPI.

=== 1960 — Move ===
Originally based in Bern, Switzerland, the BIRPI moved to Geneva in 1960.

=== 1970 — Name Change Convention ===
The BIRPI changed to the WIPO (World Intellectual Property Organization). The Convention changed the name, while also making it an intergovernmental organization which is led by member-states.

=== Beyond ===
The last director of the BIRPI was Georg Bodenhausen.

== See also ==
- Convention establishing the World Intellectual Property Organization
