= Susanne Ås Sivborg =

Swedish civil servant

Susanne Birgitta Ås Sivborg was the Director of Lantmäteriet (Swedish National Land Survey) between 1 January 2018 and 6 December 2024. Before that, she was Director General of the Swedish Patent and Registration Office. She was candidate for the position of President of the European Patent Office, which was to be filled on 1 July 2010, but was not elected to the position.
