= Jesper Kongstad =

Danish patent official

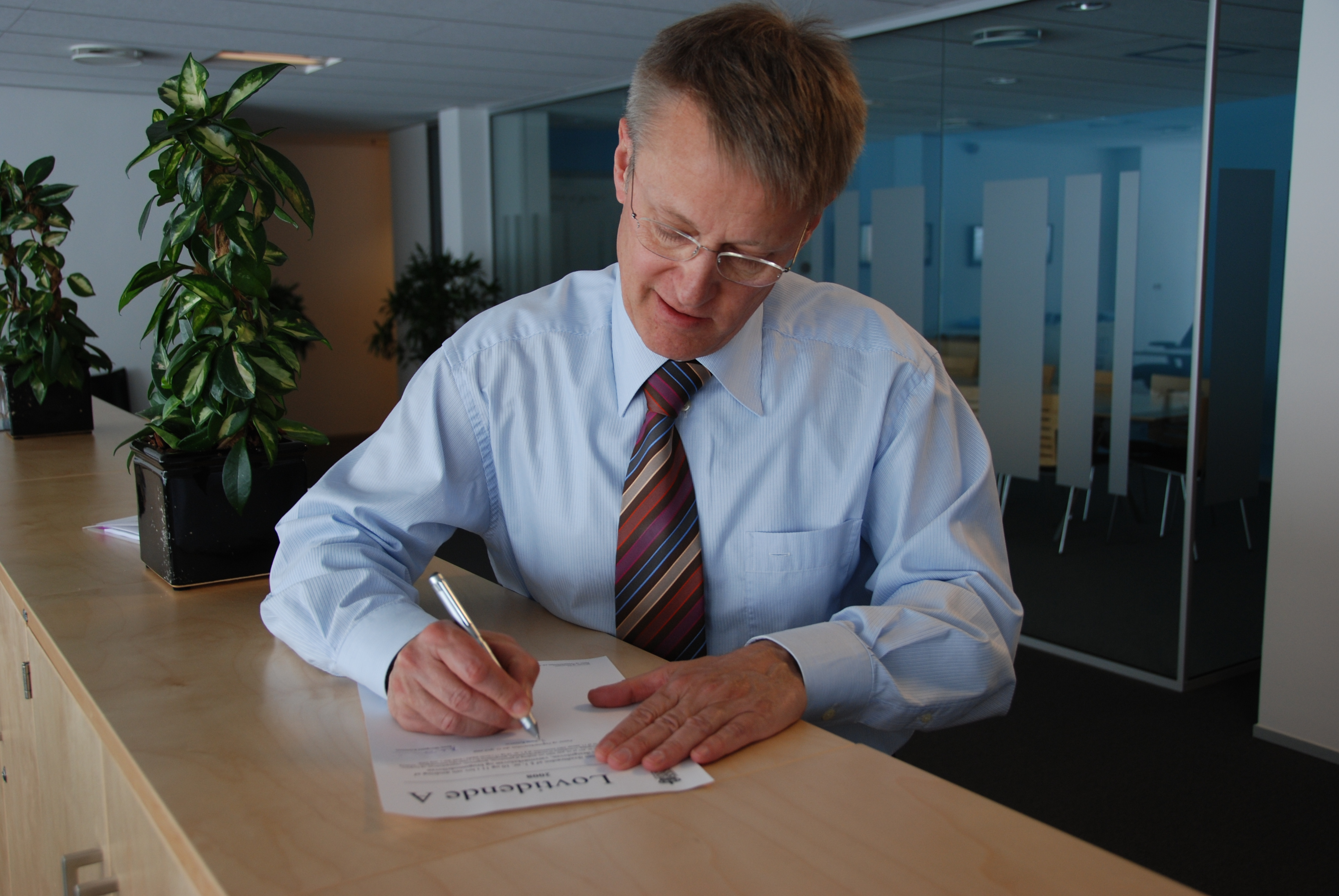
Jesper Kongstad

Jesper Kongstad was Chairman of the Administrative Council of the European Patent Organisation from 2010 to September 2017. Until September 2017, he was also Director General of the Danish Patent and Trademark Office. In 2009, he was candidate for the position of President of the European Patent Office, which was to be filled on 1 July 2010, but, in December 2009, he withdrew his candidacy. Jesper Kongstad had been elected as Chairman of the Administrative Council of the European Patent Organisation on 29 June 2010. He took up office on 1 July 2010 for a period of three years, later extended to six years.

Positions in intergovernmental organisations
Preceded by Benoît Battistelli	Chairman of the Administrative Council of the European Patent Organisation; 2010–2017	Succeeded by Christoph Ernst
