= Dominique Guellec =

French economist

Dominique Guellec is a French economist. He formerly held the post of chief economist at the European Patent Office (EPO) (2004–2005). He is senior economist at Organisation for Economic Co-operation and Development (OECD) where he is in charge of the department monitoring innovation policies.

== Bibliography ==
- The Economics of the European Patent System: IP Policy for Innovation and Competition, Oxford University Press, 2007, with Bruno van Pottelsberghe, ISBN 0-19-929206-X

== See also ==
- Alain Pompidou
- Bruno van Pottelsberghe
