= Administrative Council of the European Patent Organisation =

Chairmen of the Administrative Council of the European Patent Organisation
1. Georges Vianès (19 October 1977 - 18 October 1981), French.
2. Ivor J. G. Davis (19 October 1981 - 18 October 1984), British.
3. Otto Leberl (19 October 1984 - October 1987), Austrian.
4. Albrecht Krieger (October 1987 - 18 October 1990), German.
5. Jean-Claude Combaldieu (19 October 1990 - 18 October 1993), French.
6. Per Lund Thoft (19 October 1993 - 30 November 1995), Danish.
7. Julián Álvarez-Álvarez (1 December 1995 - 4 March 1997), Spanish.
8. Sean Fitzpatrick (5 March 1997 - March 4, 2000), Irish.
9. Roland Grossenbacher (March 5, 2000 - March 4, 2009), Swiss. ^{a}
10. Benoît Battistelli (March 5, 2009 - June 30, 2009), French.
10a. Alberto Casado Cerviño (July 1, 2009 - June 30, 2010) (Chairman ad interim), Spanish.
11. Jesper Kongstad (July 1, 2010 - September 30, 2017), Danish.
12. Christoph Ernst (October 1, 2017 - October 2018), German.
13. Josef Kratochvíl (January 1, 2019 - ), Czech.
^{a} After he stepped down, Roland Grossenbacher was made "Honorary Chairman" of the Administrative Council.

The Administrative Council of the European Patent Organisation is one of the two organs of the European Patent Organisation (EPOrg), the other being the European Patent Office (EPO). The Administrative Council acts as the Organisation's supervisory body as well as, to a limited extent, its legislative body. The actual legislative power to revise the European Patent Convention (EPC) lies with the Contracting States themselves when meeting at a Conference of the Contracting States. In contrast, the EPO acts as executive body of the Organisation.

== Composition and competences ==
The Administrative Council is composed of Representatives of the Contracting States and is responsible for overseeing the work of the European Patent Office, ratifying the budget and approving the actions of the President of the Office. The council is also competent for amending the Implementing Regulations of the EPC and some provisions of the Articles of the EPC. Each Contracting State on the Administrative Council has one vote, except under certain circumstances provided for by Article 36 EPC.

The Chairperson of the Administrative Council is responsible for the work of the council and its function. The Chairperson also presides over the meetings of the council.

Under Article 28 EPC, the Administrative Council has set up a Board composed of five of its members, including the Chairman, the Deputy Chairman and three other members elected by the Administrative Council, to perform duties assigned by the Administrative Council. The Board is informally called "Board 28", named after Article 28 EPC, and as of 2008 was carrying out a "workload study", i.e., a study on how to manage the workload facing the EPO.

The Administrative Council is in charge of appointing the President of the EPO. A majority of three-quarters of the votes of the Contracting States represented and voting is required for appointing the President of the EPO. Reaching a decision on the appointment of a president was difficult in 2003, leading to a split tenure (as a result of a compromise, Alain Pompidou (France) was elected for three years and Alison Brimelow (United Kingdom) succeeded him for an equal term), and was difficult again in 2009, requiring twenty votes and four meetings. When voting, a lot of the members of the Administrative Council are reportedly working under instructions from their respective government, whereas the governments "can have many motivations for supporting one person rather than another."

== Criticism ==
The Staff Union of the European Patent Office (SUEPO) has criticized the Administrative Council as being in a conflict of interest situation:

The heads of the national delegations in the Administrative Council are almost without exception heads of their respective national patent offices. For many of the national offices their 50% share of the renewal fees constitutes a very substantial proportion of their annual budget (in several cases well over 50%). In their function as heads of national offices these heads of delegation thus have an interest in having many patents granted, and having them granted quickly.

== See also ==
- Art. 23 1/15, Art. 23 2/15 and Art. 23 1/16, decisions relating to the suspension of a member of the Boards of Appeal of the EPO
