= Ingo Kober =

Ingo Kober (born 22 July 1942 in Liegnitz, now Legnica in Poland) was the third president of the European Patent Office.

After completing his legal studies, Ingo Kober began his professional career in 1972 as judge and public prosecutor in Mannheim and Tauberbischofsheim. In 1975 he moved to the Federal German Ministry of Justice (MoJ), where he served until 1982. He then worked for a short time as chief legal policy adviser before returning to the MoJ in November 1982 as head of its "Cabinet and Parliamentary Affairs" department. Subsequently he took charge of personnel and organisation (1985), then of overall administration at the MoJ (1986).

In January 1991, Ingo Kober was appointed Secretary of State (German: Staatssekretär) at the MoJ, a position he held until taking over as third president of the European Patent Office. He held this post from 1 January 1996 to 30 June 2004. In 2007 he was President of the Administrative Council of the Centre for International Industrial Property Studies (CEIPI), which is part of the Robert Schuman University.

Positions in intergovernmental organisations
Preceded by Paul Braendli	President of the European Patent Office; 1996–2004	Succeeded by Alain Pompidou
