= Georg Bodenhausen =

Dutch civil servant

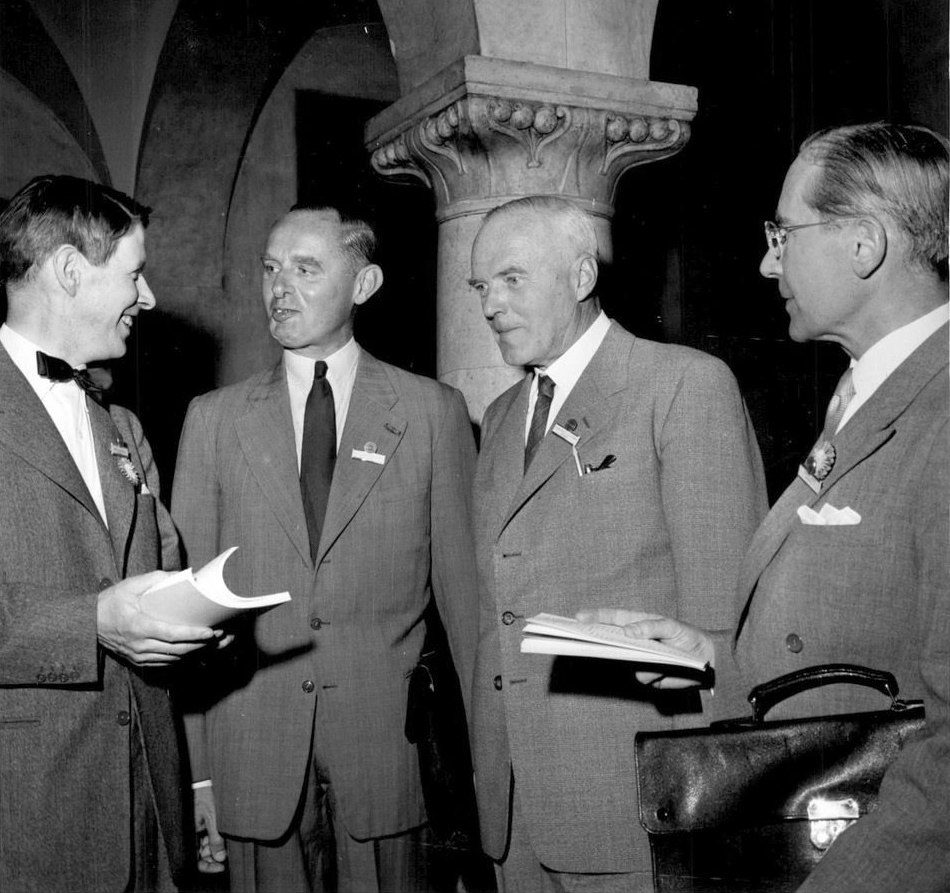
l.t.r. Seve Ljungman, Georg Bodenhausen, Christian von Sydow (AIPPI-congress, 1958)

Georg Hendrik Christiaan Bodenhausen (11 July 1905, Utrecht – 1 October 1997, Lausanne) was a Dutch civil servant. He was director of the United International Bureaux for the Protection of Intellectual Property (BIRPI) from 1963 to 1970, and the first director-general of the World Intellectual Property Organization (WIPO) from 1970 to 1973. From 1946 to 1963, he was a law professor at Utrecht University.

== Bibliography ==
- Guide to the Application of the Paris Convention for the Protection of Industrial Property As Revised at Stockholm in 1967 (United International Bureaux For the Protection of Intellectual Property (BIRPI); World Intellectual Property Organization (WIPO); February 1, 1968) ISBN 92-805-0368-5

Positions in intergovernmental organisations
Preceded by ?	Director of the United International Bureaux for the Protection of Intellectual Property (BIRPI); 1963–1970	Succeeded by None
Preceded by None	Director General of World Intellectual Property Organization (WIPO); 1970–1973	Succeeded by Árpád Bogsch
