= Paul Braendli =

Swiss intellectual property administrator

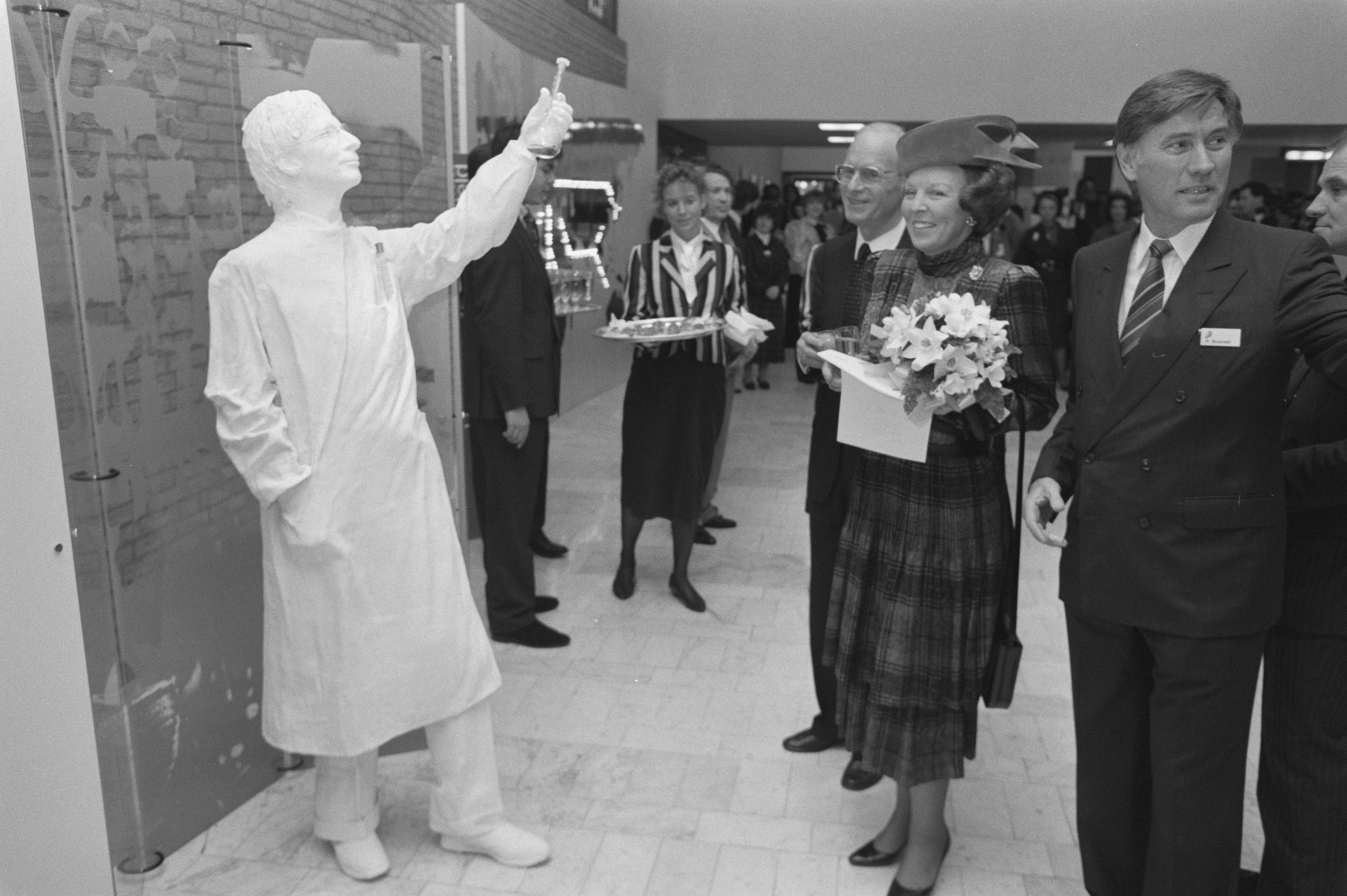
Paul Braendli (far right) at the EPO in 1988

Paul Braendli (1930 – 2026) was a Swiss patent attorney and intellectual property administrator. He was the second president of the European Patent Office (EPO), serving from 1 May 1985 to 31 December 1995.

Positions in intergovernmental organisations
Preceded by Johannes Bob van Benthem	President of the European Patent Office; 1985–1995	Succeeded by Ingo Kober
