= Johannes Bob van Benthem =

Dutch lawyer

Johannes Bob van Benthem (5 January 1921 in Buitenzorg – 11 September 2006 in The Hague) was a Dutch lawyer. He was the first president of the European Patent Office (EPO), from 1977 to 1985.

He obtained a Doctorate in Dutch Law from the University of Amsterdam in 1946. Then, he worked for the Netherlands Patent Office (Octrooiraad), first as a lawyer starting in 1946, then later on as President of the Netherlands Patent Office from 1968 to 1977, prior to working at the European Patent Office (EPO). "He was awarded honorary doctorates by the law faculties of Munich and Strasbourg Universities."

Since the beginning of December 2007, a street near the buildings of the European Patent Office in Rijswijk, near The Hague, Netherlands, is named after him. More particularly, "the stretch of Koopmansstraat between Tinbergenstraat and Limpergstraat [is] known as Van Benthemlaan". In October 2013, the address of the EPO headquarters in Munich was also renamed in his honor.

Positions in intergovernmental organisations
Preceded by (none)	President of the European Patent Office; 1977–1985	Succeeded by Paul Braendli
