= Dieter Stauder =

German lawyer

Dieter Stauder (born 1940) is a German attorney-at-law and an expert in intellectual property law. He was the Director of the International Section of the Centre for International Industrial Property Studies (French: Centre d'Etudes Internationales de la Propriété Industrielle or CEIPI), which is a part of the University of Strasbourg, France, from 1992 to 2007. From 1992 to 2005, he was member of the European Patent Office. He also worked as an attorney-at-law with the firm Bardehle Pagenberg Dost Altenburg Geissler.

He coauthored the 1200-page book "Singer/Stauder, The European Patent Convention, A Commentary, 2003", which was considered as an international reference book on the European Patent Convention. He has published at least 100 academic papers.

== Bibliography ==
- Singer/Stauder, The European Patent Convention. A Commentary, edited by Margarete Singer and Dieter Stauder, Carl Heymanns Verlag KG, Munich 2003. (sample in pdf)
