= Bruno van Pottelsberghe =

Belgian economist (born 1968)

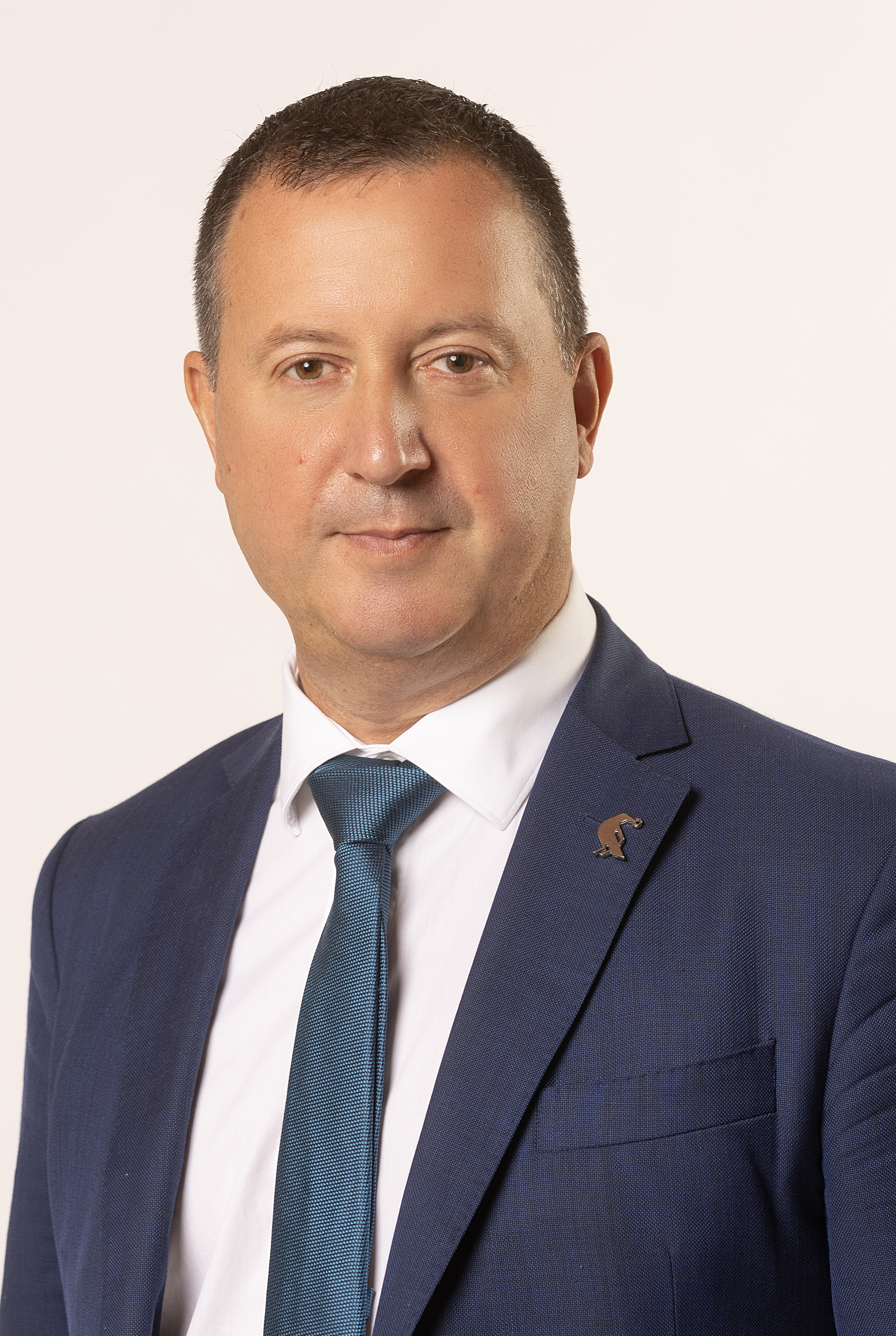
- Portrait on the Corvinus University of Budapest website, 2024 (by Tamás Lékó)
- Born: Bruno J. M. T. G. van Pottelsberghe de la Potterie; August 17, 1968 (age 58); Uccle, Brussels, Belgium
- Education: Université libre de Bruxelles, Belgium
- Occupation: Economist
- Title: Rector of Corvinus University of Budapest, Hungary

Bruno J. M. T. G. van Pottelsberghe de la Potterie (born 17 August 1968) is a Belgian economist and the Rector of the Corvinus University of Budapest since August 2024. He was previously a professor of economics at the Université libre de Bruxelles.

== Early life and education ==
Bruno van Pottelsberghe was born in Uccle, Brussels, Belgium, on 17 August 1968. From 1970 to 1978, he lived in Zaire, now the Democratic Republic of the Congo. He graduated from the Université Libre de Bruxelles (ULB) as a Bachelor in Economics in 1990, a Master in Business Economics in 1992, and a Master in Econometrics in 1994. He worked towards a Ph.D. in Economics at the same university, on a Mini-ARC Scholarship, between September 1992 and September 1996, graduating in 1998. His doctoral dissertation was entitled "Assessing the Efficiency of Science and Technology Policies inside the Triad" and was supervised by Henri Capron.

== Career ==
=== Université libre de Bruxelles ===
From 1996 until 2024, van Pottelsberghe was employed in various positions at Université libre de Bruxelles. From September 2010 to 2024 he was a full professor (professeur ordinaire) with the title of Solvay SA Chair of Innovation and for two separate terms was Dean of the Solvay Brussels School of Economics and Management there, retiring in August 2024.

=== Outside ULB ===
He was Economist at the European Patent Office, Munich, November 2005 to December 2007, then Senior Research Fellow at the Bruegel Think-Tank, December 2007 to September 2011. While there, he was a contributor to Bruegel's Memos to the new Commission: Europe's economic priorities 2010–2015 (2009), edited by André Sapir and addressed to the Barroso Commission.

=== Corvinus University of Budapest ===
In May 2024, he was appointed for a term of office of four years as Rector of the Corvinus University of Budapest, effective from August 2024. He speaks French and English fluently, but not Hungarian, noting in an interview that as a result "I may take time to fully understand complex institutional dynamics within the University. But I do come with new ideas and different ways to look at things."

== Research and contributions ==
Pottelsberghe's research activity focuses on innovation and patents, with over 60 published articles as of November 2026. He has supervised several Ph.D. students, including Gaétan de Rassenfosse.

== Personal life ==
Pottelsberghe is married, with two children.

== Books ==
- Pottelsberghe B. van, 2017, Growth, R&D spillovers and the role of patent systems - A compendium of 20 years of research on innovation economics, World Scientific Publisher, 300 pages - ISBN 9789813141148
- Guellec D. and B. van Pottelsberghe de la Potterie, 2007, The Economics of the European Patent System, Oxford University Press; also published in Chinese by National Publication Foundation, China, 2007, 250 pages - ISBN 9780199216987
- Pottelsberghe B. van, June 2009, Lost Property: the European patent system and why it doesn’t work, Bruegel Blueprint, 68 pages – ISBN 978-9-078910-12-1
