= Roland Grossenbacher =

Roland Edouard Grossenbacher is a Swiss lawyer, who served as chairman of the Administrative Council of the European Patent Organisation from 5 March 2000 to 4 March 2009. He was appointed at this post for a first three-year term on 5 March 2000. He was then reelected in 2002 for a second term, beginning on 5 March 2003. In December 2005, he was again re-elected as Chairman of the Council from a third term from 5 March 2006 to 4 March 2009. After he stepped down in March 2009, he was made "Honorary Chairman" of the Administrative Council of the European Patent Organisation.

He joined the Swiss Federal Institute of Intellectual Property in 1976, and was its director from 1989 to 2015. His first contact with patents was when he was involved "in a lawsuit while working as an attorney at law for a very small law firm." He originally came "from the copyright area" and wrote his PhD on copyright. He studied at the Zurich University from 1969 to 1974.

He was candidate for the position of President of the European Patent Office, which was to be filled on 1 July 2010, but was not elected to the position.

== Publications ==
- Die Entwicklung des Welturheberrechtsabkommens im Hinblick auf den Beitritt der Sowjetunion, Diss. Zürich 1977
- Das Uebersetzungsrecht des Welturheberrechtsabkommens und Schutzausnahmen im sowjetischen Urheberrecht: konventionsrechtliche Grenzen innerstaatlicher Einschränkungen des Uebersetzungsrecht, Film und Recht, 1977, Vol 21 No 12, p 816-821

Positions in intergovernmental organisations
| Preceded by Sean Fitzpatrick | Chairman of the Administrative Council of the European Patent Organisation; 2000–2009 | Succeeded by Benoît Battistelli |
