= GRUR =

GRUR can refer to

- German Association for the Protection of Intellectual Property (German: Deutsche Vereinigung für gewerblichen Rechtsschutz und Urheberrecht)
- Gewerblicher Rechtsschutz und Urheberrecht, its journal

== See also ==
- Gewerblicher Rechtsschutz und Urheberrecht, Rechtsprechungs-Report (GRUR-RR)
- GRUR International
