= Gilson =

Gilson may refer to:

== People ==
- Gilson (name), a list of people with the surname or given name
- Gilson (footballer, born 1967), Brazilian forward Gilson Simões de Souza
- Gilson (footballer, born 1973), Brazilian Macedonian football defensive midfielder Gilson Jesus da Silva
- Gilson (footballer, born 1991), São Toméan football defender Gilson Pereira do Espirito Santo
- Gilson de Jesus (born 1957), also known as simply Gilson, Brazilian former basketball player

== Places ==
- Gilson, Warwickshire, England, a hamlet
- Gilson, Illinois, United States, a village
- Gilson Butte, Utah, United States, a rocket launching site

== Other uses ==
- Gilson College, a Seventh-day Adventist School on the outskirts of Melbourne, Australia
- Gilson Brothers Co., a manufacturer of outdoor power equipment

== See also ==
- Gillson, a list of people with the surname
- Gelson, a list of people with the given name or nickname
