= Rechtsschutz =

Rechtsschutz is used in the name of the following academic journals:

- Gewerblicher Rechtsschutz und Urheberrecht, monthly intellectual property law journal published in German
- Gewerblicher Rechtsschutz und Urheberrecht, Internationaler Teil, monthly journal published in German until 2019, renamed GRUR International and published in English since 2020
- Gewerblicher Rechtsschutz und Urheberrecht, Rechtsprechungs-Report, monthly intellectual property law journal published in German
