= Gilson (name) =

Gilson is both an English and French surname and a given name. Notable people with the name include:

== Surname ==
- Alf Gilson (1881–1912), English footballer
- Étienne Gilson (1884–1978), French philosopher and historian of philosophy
- Earl Gilson (1923–2004), American politician
- François Gilson (born 1965), Belgian comics writer
- Franklin L. Gilson (1846–1892), American politician, judge and district attorney
- Georges Gilson (1929–2024), French Catholic archbishop and vicar general of the Archdiocese of Paris
- Jamie Gilson (1933–2020), American children's book author
- Jerome Gilson (born 1931), American trademark lawyer
- Luther F. Gilson (1829–1890), American politician
- Paul Gilson (1865–1942), Belgian composer
- Tom Gilson (1934–1962), American actor
- Tom Gilson (American football) (born 1988), American football player

== Given name ==
- Gilson de Jesus (born 1957), Brazilian former basketball player
- Gilson Lavis (1951–2025), English drummer with the band Squeeze
- Gilson Lubin, Canadian comedian
- Gilson Machado Filho (born 1998), Brazilian politician
- Gilson Silva (born 1987), Cape Verdean footballer
- Gilson Varela (born 1990), Cape Verdean footballer

== See also ==
- Gilson (disambiguation)
- Gilsinho (disambiguation)
- Gillson
