= FSR =

FSR may refer to:

== Broadcasting ==
- Fox Sports Radio, an American radio network
- Fox Sports Racing, a U.S. motorsports TV channel
- Yle FSR, a Finnish radio network

== Entertainment ==
- Flower, Sun, and Rain, a video game from Grasshopper Manufacture
- Folk Soul Revival, an American country music band
- Forces of Satan Records, a defunct Norwegian record label
- Fresh Sound, a Spanish record label
- Fresh Sounds Records, a defunct American record label
- Full Surface Records, an American record label

== Politics ==
- Financial Services Roundtable, an American lobby group
- Former Soviet republics
- Friends of Soviet Russia, an American friendship organization

== Science and technology ==
- Fractional synthetic rate
- Finite-state recognizer
- Fisheye State Routing
- Flood Studies Report, a hydrological text
- Force-sensing resistor
- Free spectral range
- FidelityFX Super Resolution, part of AMD's FidelityFX toolset

== Scouting ==
- Federation of Scouts of Russia
- Forestburg Scout Reservation, a Boy Scout Camp in New York, United States

== Other uses ==
- First ScotRail, a defunct Scottish rail company
- First Strike Ration of the United States Army
- Five-second rule (basketball)
- Fleet Street Reports: Cases on Intellectual Property Law
- Floor space ratio
- Forest Service Road
- Fort Smith Railroad, an American rail company
- Full-service restaurant
- Fabryka Samochodów Rolniczych "Polmo" w Poznaniu, a defunct Polish car manufacturer
