= Dan L. Burk =

American academic

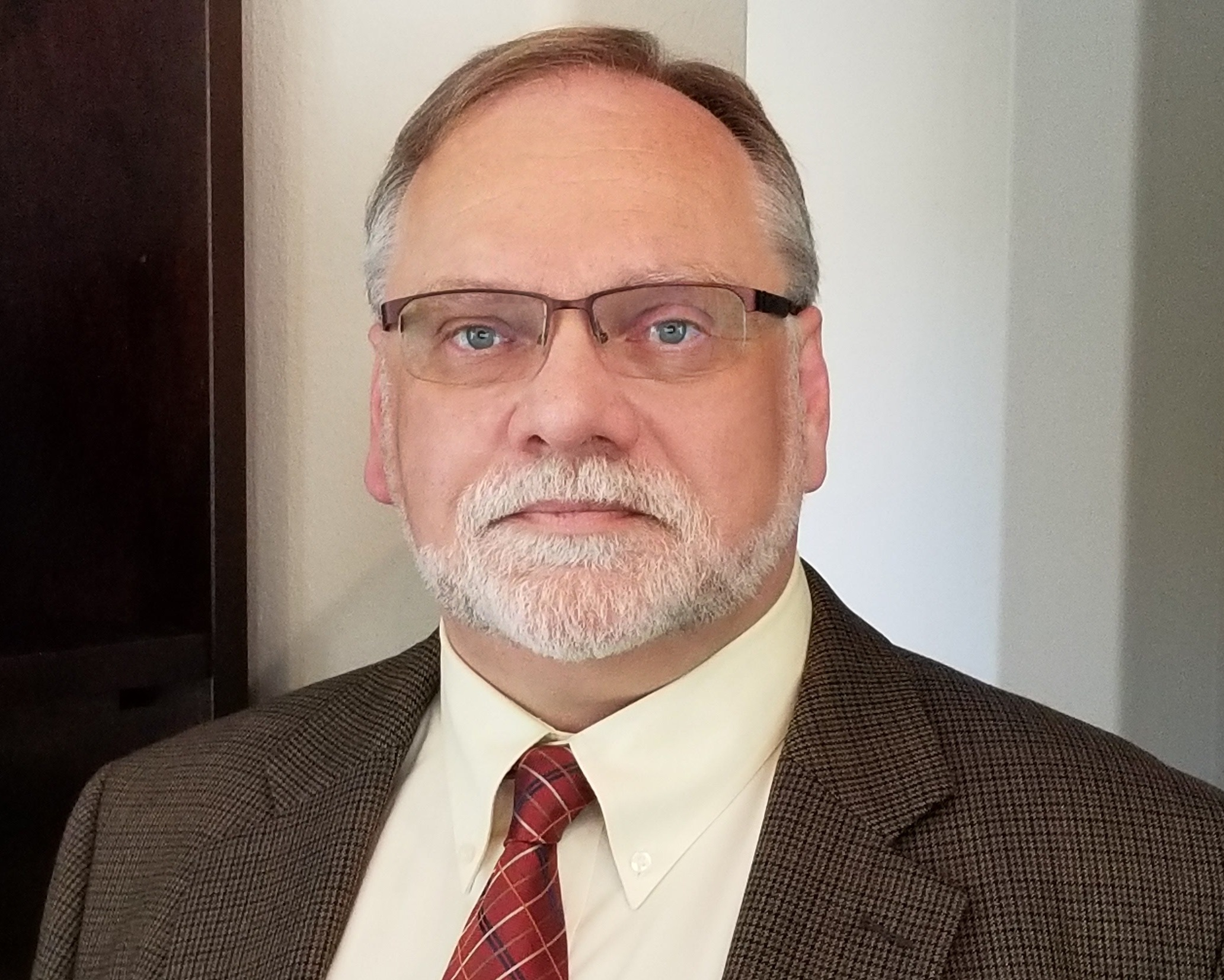
- Born: Los Angeles, California, U.S.
- Died: February 4, 2024
- Education: Brigham Young University (BS); Northwestern University (MS); Arizona State University (JD); Stanford Law School (MSL)
- Scientific career
- Fields: Intellectual Property, Gene Patenting, Patent Law
- Workplaces: Seton Hall University School of Law (1997–1999); University of Minnesota Law School (2000–2008); University of California, Irvine School of Law (2008–2024)

Dan L. Burk was an American legal scholar who was Chancellor's Professor of Law at the University of California, Irvine School of Law and a founding member of the law faculty. His areas of expertise included intellectual property, gene patenting, digital copyright, electronic commerce and computer trespass.

== Education ==
Burk held a B.S. in Microbiology (1985) from Brigham Young University, an M.S. (1987) in Molecular Biology and Biochemistry from Northwestern University, a J.D. (1990) from Arizona State University, and a J.S.M (1994) from Stanford University.

== Academic career ==
Burk was an assistant professor at Seton Hall University School of Law from 1995 to 1997, and an associate professor from 1997 to 1999. He served as a professor at the University of Minnesota Law School from 2000 to 2008. In 2008, he became a founding faculty member at the University of California, Irvine, School of Law, where he is currently Chancellor's Professor of Law.

He had been a visiting professor at a number of universities in the United States, including George Mason University School of Law from 1993 to 1995; Cardozo Law School (Yeshiva University) and Ohio State University in 1999; University of Minnesota Law School from 1999 to 2000; Boalt Hall School of Law (University of California, Berkeley) in 2003; and Cornell University Law School in 2005.

He also taught in institutions across the world, including: Università Cattolica del Sacro Cuore in Italy from 2001 to 2004; the University of Toronto Faculty of Law in Canada in 2003; the University of Tilburg in the Netherlands in 2007; the Munich Intellectual Property Law Center, Max Planck Institute for Innovation and Competition in Germany from 2004 to 2016; the University of Haifa in Israel in 2010; the University of Lucerne in Switzerland in 2014; and the Paris Institute of Political Studies in France in 2016.

== Academic distinctions ==
In 2015, he was selected for a Leverhulme visitorship to the London School of Economics and Political Science, where he delivered a series of Leverhulme Public Lectures on “Biotechnology and Software Patenting in the Information Society”.

In 2017, he was awarded the Fulbright U.S. Scholar Award in Cybersecurity to the Oxford Internet Institute in the United Kingdom for the fall 2017, according to the U.S. Department of State and the J. William Fulbright Foreign Scholarship Board.

== Death ==
Burk, who had cancer, died at his home at the age of 61.

== Scholarly impact ==
Burk's scholarship has dealt with legal issues created by emerging technologies. His 1996 article on “Federalism in Cyberspace” became the basis of several early decisions by U.S. federal courts regarding state regulation of the Internet, including American Library Association v. Pataki (S.D. N.Y. 1997) and American Civil Liberties Union v. Johnson (10th Cir. 1999), and was important in shaping the character of present Internet activity. Another notable article, “The Trouble With Trespass” (2000), influenced courts considering legal claims regarding “trespass to computers,” while Burk's analysis of the issue was adopted in the landmark opinion of the California Supreme Court in Intel Corp. v. Hamidi.

His work on "Patenting Speech" offered an examination of patent law and the First Amendment; in a widely discussed article asking "Do Patents Have Gender?" he examined the "gender gap" in the patent system; and his 2003 article on "Policy Levers in Patent Law," written with Mark A. Lemley, is ranked among the most cited law articles of all time.

His 2009 book with Lemley, The Patent Crisis and How the Courts Can Solve It, has been "highly recommended" by Choice, the publishing branch of the Association of College and Research Libraries (ACRL), and has received positive reviews in the Journal of High Technology Law and the Indian Journal of Intellectual Property Law. Burk also testified before Congress regarding this latter work during hearings on the America Invents Act.

== Public Lectures ==
- Leverhume Public Lectures at the London School of Economics, March 2015: The Gene Patent Controversy, The Software Patent Puzzle, and Patenting Information Technologies

== Books and publications ==
Burk's articles have been published in law reviews and journals including: the Harvard Law Review, the Minnesota Law Review, the Lewis & Clark Law Review, the Northwestern University Law Review, the Stanford Law Review, the National Law Journal, the Duke Journal of Gender Law & Policy, and the International Review of Intellectual Property and Competition Law. Burk's most recent book with Mark A. Lemley, The Patent Crisis and How the Courts Can Solve It, was published by the University of Chicago Press in 2009.

A full list of publication is available here.
