= Dev Gangjee =

- Awards: Rhodes Scholarship

Academic background
- Education: National Law School of India University; University of Oxford

Academic work
- Discipline: Law
- Sub-discipline: Intellectual property law
- Institutions: University of Oxford; London School of Economics (former)
- Website: www.law.ox.ac.uk/people/dev-gangjee

Dev Gangjee is Professor of Intellectual Property Law in the Law Faculty of the University of Oxford and a Law Fellow at St Hilda's College, Oxford. He was Director of the Oxford IP Research Centre (OIPRC) until 2023 and is also on the Editorial Boards of the Modern Law Review and Queen Mary Journal of Intellectual Property. He is a visiting professor at the Munich Intellectual Property Law Centre and has held visiting fellowships at the Institute of Intellectual Property in Tokyo, the IP Research Institute of Australia at UNSW, Hong Kong University, the National University of Singapore and the University of Berne.

== Academic career ==
Gangjee graduated from the National Law School of India and completed his postgraduate degrees in Oxford as a Rhodes Scholar. He was senior lecturer at the London School of Economics where he won teaching prizes before joining Oxford (where he also won a student welfare award). He was appointed as Professor of Intellectual Property Law in 2019. He was also the Des Voeux Chambers (DVC) Oxford-HKU Visiting Fellow in 2018.

Gangjee's research focuses on Branding and Trade Marks, Geographical Indications and Copyright law. He regularly advises national governments, law firms, international organisations and the European Commission on IP issues.

== Selected publications ==
- Bently, Sherman, Gangjee, and Johnson, Intellectual Property Law (6th ed) (OUP 2022)
- Simon Fhima and Gangjee, The Confusion Test in European Trade Mark Law (OUP 2019)
- Gangjee, Research Handbook on Intellectual Property and Geographical Indications (Elgar Publishing 2016)
- Gangjee, Relocating the Law of Geographical Indications (CUP 2012)
