= Jerome Gilson =

American lawyer

- Born: January 12, 1931 (age 95); Illinois
- Occupations: lawyer, author
- Spouse: Jamie Gilson

Jerome Gilson (born January 12, 1931) was an American trademark lawyer and author of a multivolume treatise on trademark law.

== Life ==
Jerome Gilson was born in Chicago, Illinois on January 12, 1931.

In 1952, he graduated from the University of Missouri and served in the United States Army from 1952 to 1955. He graduated from the Northwestern University School of Law in 1958.

He was married to author Jamie Gilson and has three adult children, Tom, Matthew and Anne. He lives in a suburb of Chicago.

== Career ==
Gilson practiced trademark law with the Chicago law firm Brinks Gilson & Lione beginning in 1963 and became a name partner in 1983. That firm merged with the international law firm Crowell & Moring in 2021.

Gilson handled significant matters in federal court and before the Trademark Trial and Appeal Board. He mediated federal trademark infringement actions and counseled clients on a variety of trademark litigation issues.

Gilson authored or co-authored numerous scholarly articles on trademark law on topics including zombie trademarks, scandalous trademarks, and proving trademark ownership online.

From 1988 to 1993, Gilson was an Advisor on the American Law Institute project that led to the publication of the Restatement (Third) of the Law of Unfair Competition.

Gilson served on the board of directors of the International Trademark Association from 1978 to 1980 and was Counsel to the Association from 1991 to 1994. He also served as Reporter on the International Trademark Association's Trademark Review Commission from 1984 to 1987. The Commission analyzed federal trademark law, known as the Lanham Act, and its work led to the enactment of the Trademark Law Revision Act of 1988. Gilson assisted in drafting the legislation and testified on it before the United States Congress.

== Books and articles ==
Matthew Bender & Co. began publishing Gilson's regularly updated treatise Trade-Mark Protection and Practice in 1974. The treatise was renamed Gilson on Trademarks in 2007. Gilson authored the treatise from 1974 to 2005, after which he became a collaborator on the treatise with his daughter, Anne Gilson LaLonde, who took over authorship. The treatise is now ten volumes and is published by LexisNexis.

== Acclaim ==
In 2007, Gilson was inducted into the IP Hall of Fame, sponsored by Intellectual Asset Management magazine.

Gilson received two lifetime achievement awards, one from Managing Intellectual Property magazine in 2008 and the other from World Trademark Review in 2011.

In 2003, Gilson was ranked one of the top five U.S. trademark practitioners in Euromoney magazine's Best of the Best Expert Guide, receiving the most votes nationwide.

Gilson and his daughter, Anne Gilson LaLonde, received four Burton Awards for Legal Achievement, in 2003, 2005, 2006 and 2011, for articles they co-authored.

In 2001, the International Trademark Association bestowed on Gilson the President's Award for Dedicated and Distinguished Service. The Association gave Gilson the award because he "was a member of the U.S. Trademark Review Commission and served as its reporter. The Commission's work culminated in the Trademark Law Revision Act of 1988, changing the landscape of U.S. trademark law and practice."

In 1998, Gilson was named the top trademark practitioner in the world by Managing Intellectual Property magazine, based on an international survey of attorneys.
