= Joseph Straus =

Joseph Straus (born 1938 in Trieste, Italy) is professor of intellectual property law, former director of the Max Planck Institute for Intellectual Property, Competition and Tax Law, Munich, Germany, and Chairman of the Managing Board of the Munich Intellectual Property Law Center (MIPLC). According to the Intellectual Asset Management magazine, he is "one of the world's most influential patent scholars." He is member and dean of the Class "Social Sciences, Law and Economics" of the European Academy of Sciences and Arts.
