= Land consumption =

Expansion of built-up area

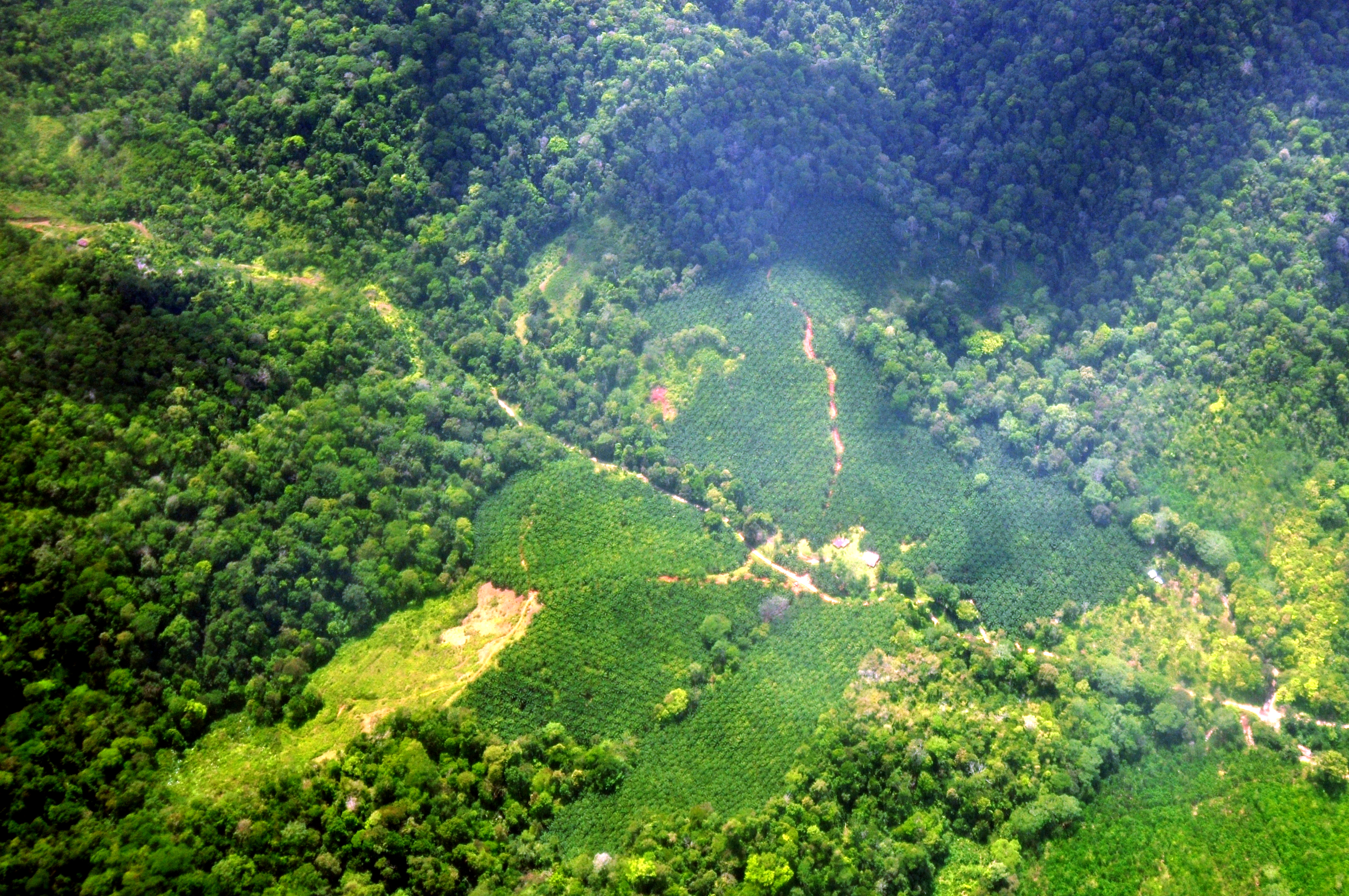
Tropical forest deforestation for oil palm plantations in Costa Rica

Land consumption as part of human resource consumption is the conversion of land with healthy soil and intact habitats into areas for industrial agriculture, traffic (road building) and especially urban human settlements. More formally, the European Environment Agency (EEA) has identified three land consuming activities:

- the expansion of built-up area which can be directly measured;
- the absolute extent of land that is subject to exploitation by agriculture, forestry or other economic activities; and
- the over-intensive exploitation of land that is used for agriculture and forestry.

In all of those respects, land consumption is equivalent to typical land use in industrialized regions and civilizations.

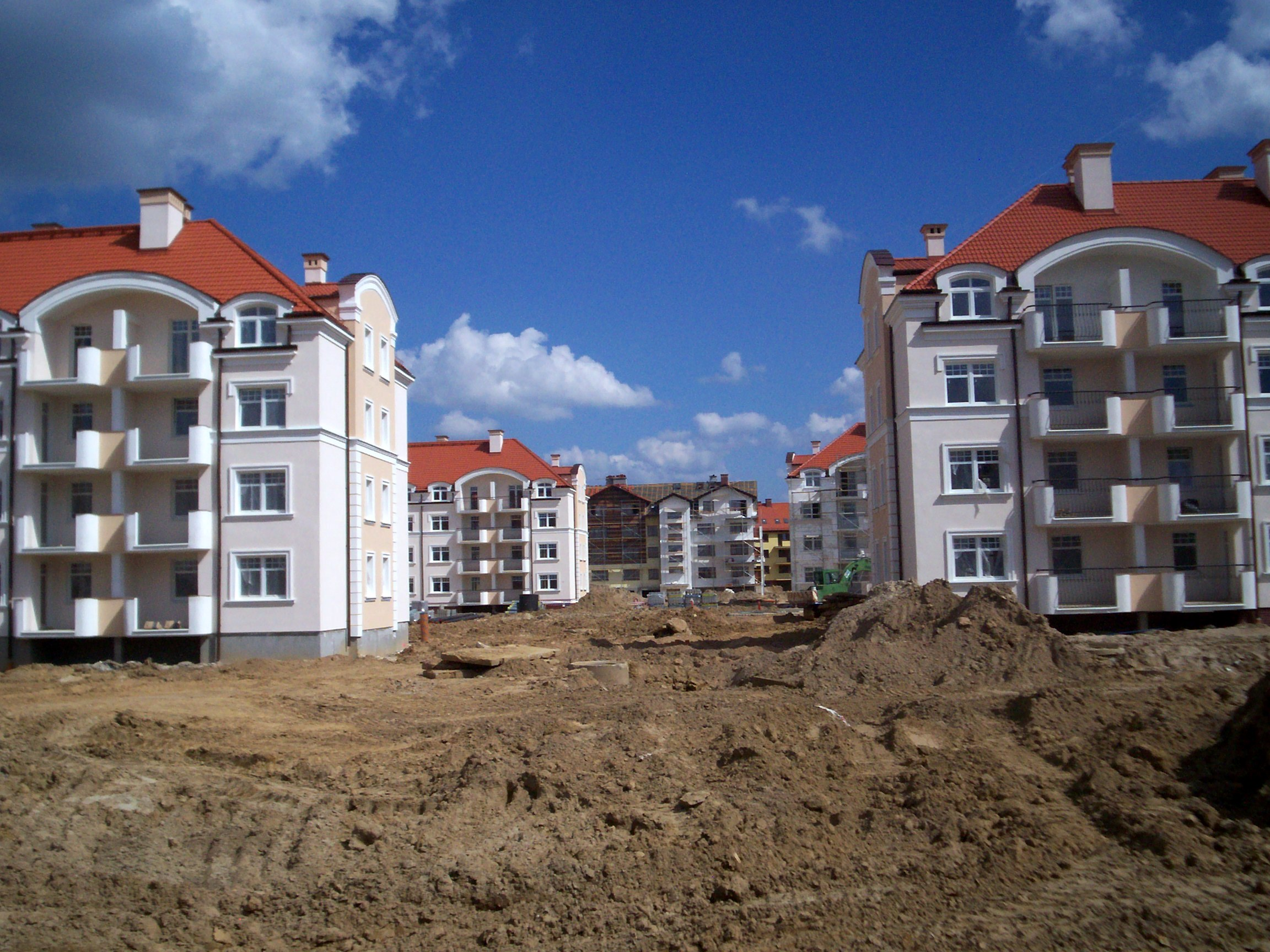
Building construction in Olsztyn, Poland

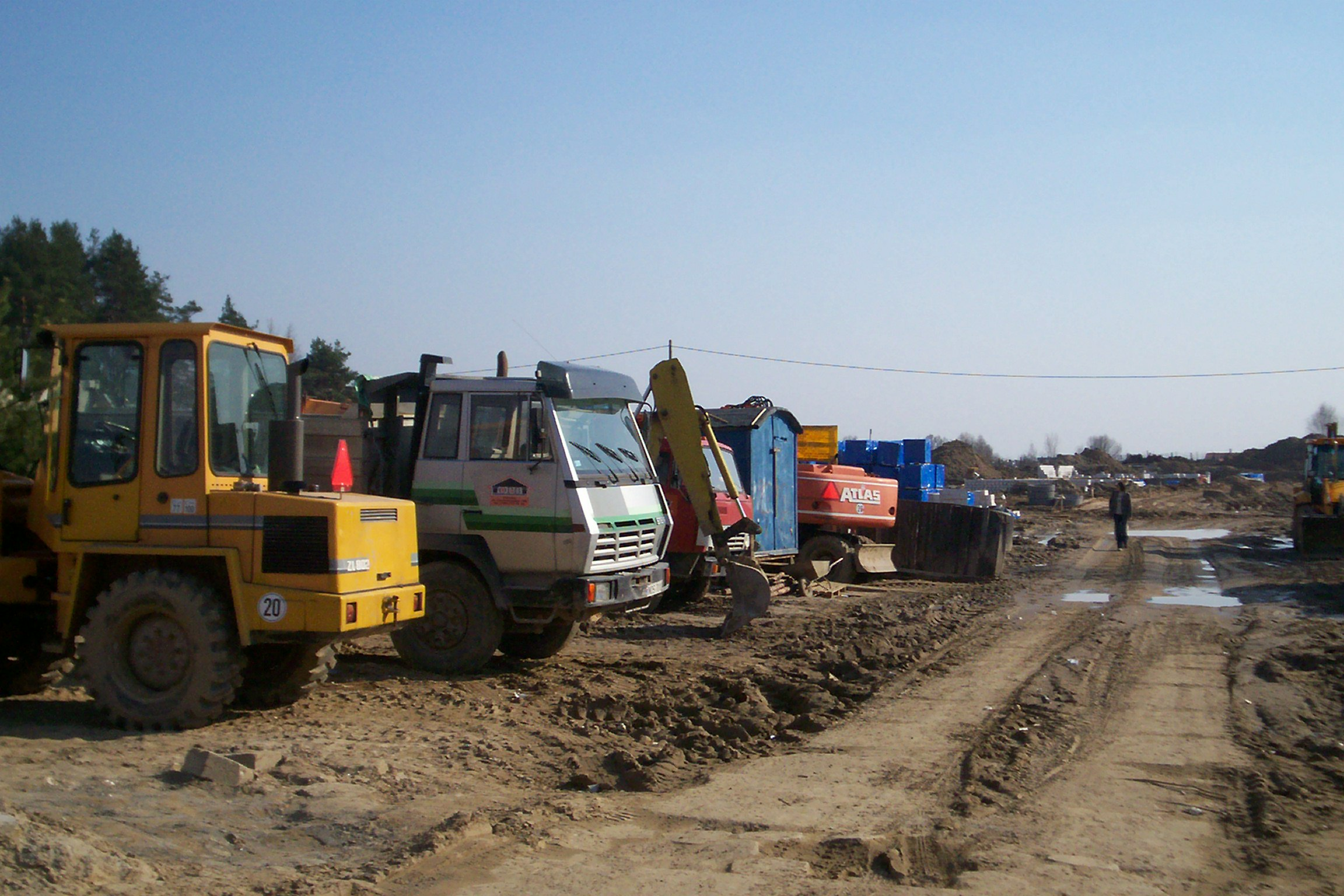
Road construction in Olsztyn, Poland

Since these land-consuming activities are virtually irreversible, the term land loss is also used. From 1990 to 2000, 1.4 million hectares (3.5×10^{6} acres) of open space were consumed in the U.S. In Germany, land is being consumed at a rate of more than 70 hectares (170 acres) every day (~250 thousand hectares (620,000 acres) per 10 years).

Land loss can also happen due to natural factors, like erosion or desertification - nevertheless most of those can also eventually be tracked back to human activities. Another slightly different interpretation of the term is the forced displacement or compulsory acquisition of a native people or settlers from their original land due to land grabbing, etc. Again, in most cases, this will be due to economic reasons like search for profitable investment and commodification of natural resources.

Reducing global land loss, which progresses at an alarming rate, is vital since the land footprint, the area required both domestically and abroad to produce the goods and services consumed by a country or region, can be much larger than the land actually used or even available in the country itself. Much of Europe's consumption needs are met using land outside the borders of the European Union: the Soil Atlas published by the Institute for Advanced Sustainability Studies (IASS) in Potsdam, Germany, says that Europe is "the continent that is most dependent on land beyond its borders to sustain its lifestyle, its agricultural industry and its hunger for energy". Such land is also referred to as "imported land". For the European Union, land take is estimated approximately about to 1.2 million hectares in 21 EU countries over the period 1990–2006.

While land prices have surged in the first few years of the 21st century, land consumption economy still lacks environmental full-cost accounting to add the long-term costs of environmental degradation.

== Consequences of land consumption ==
The major effects of land conversion for economic growth are:

- Land degradation
- Habitat loss – built-up areas support only particularly adapted species
- Soil degradation – loss or contamination of top soil by civilization waste and general pollution
- Soil compaction – buildings, heavy machinery and vehicle traffic compact the soil to a degree that macrobiotic soil life is eradicated
- Impervious surfaces – asphalt and concrete seal off the soil from the atmosphere and disrupt natural water and biogeochemical cycles

Urban growth reduces open space in and around cities, impacting biodiversity and ecosystem services

— McDonald et al.

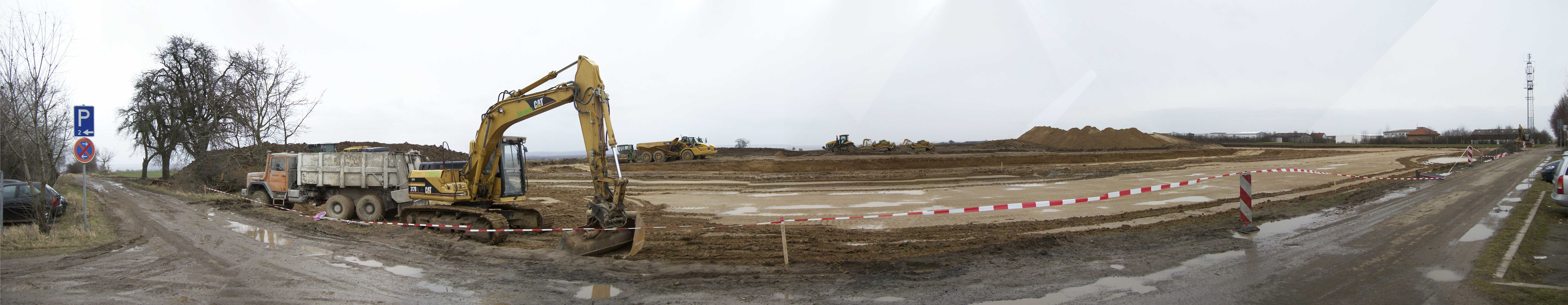
Land conversion in Wörrstadt, Germany

== See also ==
- Land reclamation
- Land rehabilitation
- Land restoration
- Land use
