= IPKat =

- Website type: Weblog
- Creators: Jeremy Phillips, Ilanah Simon Fhima
- Website: http://www.ipkat.com
- Commercial: No
- Registration: No
- Launched: 2003

IPKat is a law blog founded in June 2003, and dedicated to intellectual property law (IP) with a focus on European law. The content comprises news of recent judicial rulings, decisions of patent and trade mark granting authorities, primary and secondary legislation, practice and procedural notes and recent publications, together with comments.

== Contributors ==
A feature of the blog is the expression of opinions through the often contrasting observations made by two fictional cats, the IPKat himself and his female companion Merpel. A third feline, the AmeriKat, analyses IP developments in the U.S.

IPKat was founded by Jeremy Phillips, who had previously launched the Managing Intellectual Property magazine and sold it to Euromoney Publications in 1991.

As of December 2017, the contributors included Annsley Merelle Ward (a.k.a. "the AmeriKat"), and Neil J. Wilkof. Johanna Gibson stepped down in January 2009, as did David Pearce in February 2011, Jeremy Phillips in 2015, and Mark Schweizer at the end of 2017.

== Awards and recognition ==
In July 2005, IPKat was named in Managing Intellectual Property magazine (which Phillips founded fourteen years earlier) as one of the 50 most influential people in the IP world.

In August 2008, IPKat was voted top of the 'IT law and governance' category in Computer Weekly magazine's 2008 IT blog awards. In the same year, a legal book reported it as being "one of the best-known and most successful of all law blogs".

In January 2010, the United States Library of Congress selected the IPKat for inclusion in its historic collections of Internet materials related to Legal Blawgs. In December 2010, IPKat was selected as one of the American Bar Association's Top 100 Legal Blawgs.

== Trademark ==
IPKat is a registered Community Trade Mark (Registered Number: 008150286).
