= Jeremy Phillips =

British legal scholar

- Born: 25 December 1951 (age 74)
- Education: Cambridge University; University of Kent

Jeremy Phillips (born 25 December 1951) is a retired British academic, author, editor, publisher, and commentator in intellectual property (IP) law. In 2007, he was reported to be "a respected IP academic" and "a well-known figure among IP lawyers."

== Career ==
He read law at Cambridge University in the early 1970s and went on doing a PhD at the University of Kent. He then taught law at Trinity College Dublin, Durham University, and Queen Mary University of London.

In 1990, he launched the Managing Intellectual Property magazine and sold it to Euromoney Publications in 1991. He also edited the magazines Patent World, Trademark World and Copyright World and cofounded the IPKat weblog. He also contributed to the Afro-IP blog and the Class 46 blog on European Trade Mark law. He was editor of the Journal of Intellectual Property Law & Practice (JIPLP), European Trade Mark Reports and European Copyright and Design Reports journals. He was also a council member of the Intellectual Property Institute.

He was consultant at the law firm Slaughter and May until May 2007 and worked as a consultant at the law firm Olswang from June 2007 until his retirement in 2015. He was visiting professor at the Faculty of Laws of University College London (UCL), the Bournemouth Law School, Bournemouth University, and the University of Alicante. He was also professorial fellow at the Queen Mary Intellectual Property Research Institute from 2003 to 2006.

== Bibliography ==
Partial list.

- Employees' Inventions in the United Kingdom, ESC Pub., 1982, ISBN 0-906214-11-4, coauthored with M J Hoolahan
- An Introduction to Intellectual Property Law, Butterworths Law, 1995, ISBN 0-406-04515-1, coauthored with Alison Firth
- Trade Mark Law: A Practical Anatomy, Oxford University Press, 2003 ISBN 0-19-926796-0
