= List of intellectual property law journals =

This list includes notable journals and magazines concerned with intellectual property (IP) law and business, and their various sub-fields, such as copyright, patent and trademark laws. The list also includes official journals and gazettes of patent offices.

== Academic, by language ==
=== English ===
- American Intellectual Property Law Association Quarterly Journal
- Berkeley Technology Law Journal
- Cardozo Arts & Entertainment Law Journal
- Chicago-Kent Journal of Intellectual Property
- Columbia Journal of Law & the Arts
- Cybaris
- European Intellectual Property Review
- Fordham Intellectual Property, Media & Entertainment Law Journal
- GRUR International (named Gewerblicher Rechtsschutz und Urheberrecht, Internationaler Teil and published in German until 2019, and since 2020 in English)
- Harvard Journal of Law & Technology
- IDEA: The Intellectual Property Law Review
- Intellectual Property and Technology Forum
- Intellectual Property and Technology Law Journal
- International Review of Intellectual Property and Competition Law
- John Marshall Review of Intellectual Property Law
- Journal of the Copyright Society of the USA
- Journal of Intellectual Property Law
- Journal of Intellectual Property and Entertainment Law
- Journal of Intellectual Property Law & Practice
- Journal of Intellectual Property Rights
- Journal of the Patent and Trademark Office Society
- Journal of World Intellectual Property
- New Zealand Intellectual Property Journal
- Northwestern Journal of Technology and Intellectual Property
- The Trademark Reporter
- Tulane Journal of Technology and Intellectual Property
- Wake Forest Journal of Business and Intellectual Property Law
- The WIPO Journal

=== German ===
- Gewerblicher Rechtsschutz und Urheberrecht
- Gewerblicher Rechtsschutz und Urheberrecht, Internationaler Teil (until 2019 in German, renamed GRUR International and published in English since 2020)
- Gewerblicher Rechtsschutz und Urheberrecht, Rechtsprechungs-Report
- Mitteilungen der deutschen Patentanwälte

=== French ===
- Propriété industrielle

== Business, by language ==
=== English ===
- epi Information
- Intellectual Asset Management
- Managing Intellectual Property
- Patent Information News (also in German and French)
- Patent World
- World Intellectual Property Review
- World Trademark Review

== Official ==
Some national and supranational patent and trade mark offices publish official gazettes, in which applications, registrations, and other official actions relating to specific intellectual property rights are officially published. In some countries, publication in the gazette is required for an action to take effect. Some patent and trade mark offices additionally publish journals or periodicals, which contain more general notices, new guidance and procedural rules, and other information. The list below is of a small selection of official gazettes and journals, and indicates the publishing office after each gazette or journal listed.

=== Gazettes ===
- European Patent Bulletin - European Patent Office
- PCT Gazette - World Intellectual Property Organization
- Trademarks Journal - Canadian Intellectual Property Office
- Trademark Official Gazette - United States Patent and Trademark Office
- PIBD (Propriété industrielle bulletin documentaire) - Institut national de la propriété industrielle

=== Journals ===
- Official Journal of the European Patent Office
- PCT Newsletter

== Case law reporters ==
- European Patent Office Reports
- Fleet Street Reports: Cases on Intellectual Property Law
- United States Patents Quarterly

== See also ==
- List of law journals
