= ISSN National Centre India =

Indian government agency

ISSN National Centre, India is the national agency responsible for assigning International Standard Serial Numbers (ISSNs) to serial publications published in India. It operates under the CSIR–National Institute of Science Communication and Policy Research (CSIR-NIScPR), a constituent laboratory of the Council of Scientific and Industrial Research (CSIR), Government of India.

The centre facilitates the identification and registration of scholarly journals, magazines, newspapers, annual reports, and other continuing resources published in the country. It also maintains the national ISSN database and coordinates with the ISSN International Centre in Paris, France, to ensure compliance with international ISSN standards. The ISSN National Centre serves publishers, academic institutions, research organizations, and government agencies by providing unique identifiers for serial publications, thereby supporting their discoverability and bibliographic control.
