= Queen Mary Journal of Intellectual Property =

Queen Mary Journal of Intellectual Property Law
- Discipline: Intellectual property law, industrial property law, patent law, trade mark law, design law, copyright law
- Language: English
- Edited by: Professor Johanna Gibson, Lord Hoffmann

Publication details
- History: 2011–present
- Publisher: Edward Elgar Publishing on behalf of the Queen Mary Intellectual Property Research Institute (United Kingdom)
- Frequency: 4/year

Standard abbreviations
- ISO 4: Queen Mary J. Intellect. Prop.

Indexing
- ISSN: 2045-9807 (print); 2045-9815 (web)
- LCCN: 2012205385
- OCLC no.: 847747447

Links
- Journal homepage; Journal page at publisher's website

The Queen Mary Journal of Intellectual Property (QMJIP) is a quarterly double-blind peer-reviewed academic journal, that publishes articles as well as analysis pieces and case reports about intellectual property matters. The journal has been published by Edward Elgar Publishing since April 2011, according to which "[i]t is the only IP journal with an Impact Factor included in the Social Sciences Citation Index".

QMJIP is overseen by Professor Johanna Gibson (Herchel Smith Professor of Intellectual Property Law and Director of the Queen Mary Intellectual Property Research Institute (QMIPRI) and Lord Hoffmann (former judge of the House of Lords and Honorary Professor of Intellectual Property Law, Centre for Commercial Law Studies, Queen Mary University of London).

== See also ==
- List of intellectual property law journals
