= WTR =

WTR may refer to:

- Wayne Taylor Racing
- Woomera Test Range
- World Trademark Review
- Within the Ruins, an American metalcore band
- Working time reduction
- The EU Wire Transfer Regulation
