= JIPR =

JIPR may refer to:

- Jerusalem Institute for Policy Research
- Journal of Intellectual Property Rights
