= Intellectual Property Institute =

Intellectual Property Institute may refer to:

- Intellectual Property Institute (United Kingdom)
- Intellectual Property Institute, at the University of Richmond School of Law, Virginia, US
- International Intellectual Property Institute, Washington, D.C., US
