= Gerhard Schricker =

German legal scholar (1935–2021)

Gerhard Schricker (25 June 1935 – 6 April 2021) was a German legal scholar with a focus on intellectual property and competition law. He was a full professor at LMU Munich from 1973 to 2000 and served as Director of the Munich-based Max Planck Institute for Foreign and International Patent, Trademark, and Copyright Law (now the Max Planck Institute for Innovation and Competition) between 1971 and 2003.

== Life ==
Schricker was born in Nuremberg and studied law at LMU Munich with stays at the University of Padua and the University of Salamanca. Having passed his first Staatsexamen with the (rarely awarded) highest possible grade (sehr gut – very good), he became a research assistant in 1960 at the LMU's Institute for Foreign and International Patent, Trademark, and Copyright Law. Under the supervision of Eugen Ulmer, Schricker commenced a doctorate and in 1961 became Doctor of Law summa cum laude with a thesis on misleading advertisement under Italian competition law in comparison to German competition law. He completed his second Staatsexamen in 1964.

From 1966, he worked as a senior researcher at the newly founded Max Planck Institute for Foreign and International Patent, Trademark, and Copyright Law. While at the institute, Schricker pursued a habilitation, again under Eugen Ulmer's supervision, and in 1969 received his venia legendi in the areas of "Civil Law, Trade Law, Intellectual Property, and Comparative Private Law" from LMU. His habilitation thesis, a comparative study of the relationship between breaches of statutory duties and the concept of unfair competition, quickly became a standard work in the field and helped shape German competition law jurisprudence. In 1970, Schricker became a Scientific Member of the Max Planck Society.

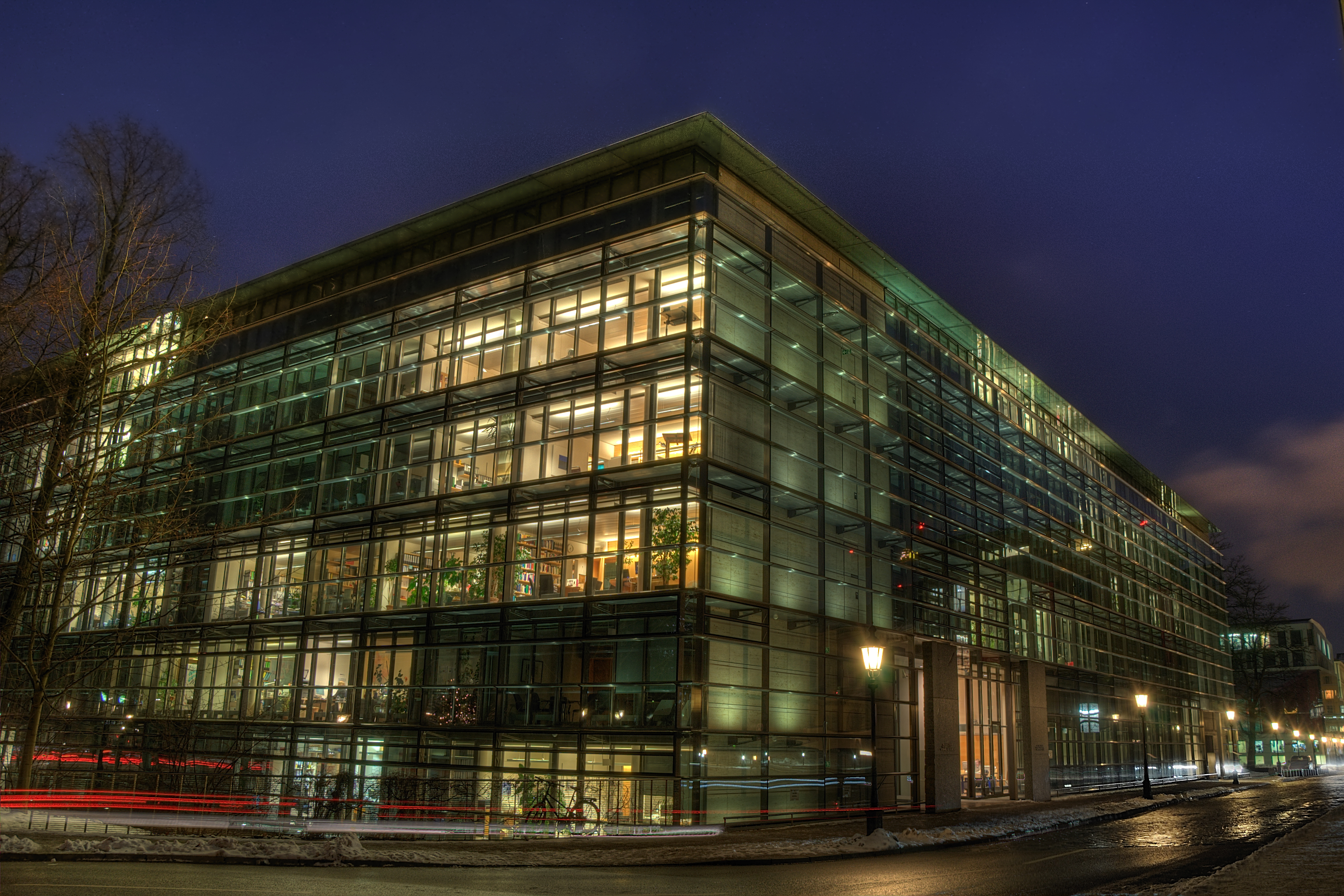
Max Planck Institute for Foreign and International Patent, Copyright and Competition Law. The institute moved into its new building (pictured) during Gerhard Schricker's directorship.

In 1971, after declining two offers of a full professorship by the universities of Hamburg and Würzburg, Gerhard Schricker became co-director of the Max Planck Institute for Foreign and International Patent, Trademark, and Copyright Law (alongside Eugen Ulmer and Friedrich-Karl Beier). Two years later, he was also appointed to the Chair of Trade and Economic Law, Industrial Property, and Copyright at LMU. He served as Dean of the Faculty of Law for a term beginning in 1979. Following the retirement of Friedrich-Karl Beier in 1991, Schricker became the sole Managing Director of the Max Planck Institute, a position that he held until 2001. He retired as professor in 2000, having supervised six habilitation and more than 180 dissertation theses.

Schricker was president of the German ALAI group from 1982 through 1998. He was a member of the Executive Committee of the German Association for the Protection of Intellectual Property (GRUR) for 27 years and headed GRUR's Standing Committee on Copyright and Publishing Law for more than 20. From 1990 through 2004, he was a volunteer member of the Board of Directors of VG Wort, the second-largest German collective management organization.

Gerhard Schricker died in April 2021. According to a death announcement by his family, his death followed a "prolonged and severe illness".

== Awards and honours ==
Gerhard Schricker was awarded the Great Cross of Merit of the Federal Republic of Germany in 2001. In the same year, he was conferred membership in the Academia Europaea. He was made an honorary member of VG Wort in 2004. In 2006, Schricker was awarded the Rudolf Callmann Medal by GRUR. He held honorary doctorates from the Université libre de Bruxelles, Stockholm University, and Yonsei University (Seoul).

A festschrift edited by Friedrich-Karl Beier was published in 1995 in honour of Gerhard Schricker on the occasion of his 60th birthday. Rather unusually for the genre, the contributions were interdependent and effectively formed a self-contained 900-page study of copyright contract law. In 2003, a low-circulation booklet (dubbed a "mini 'festschrift'" in the preface) was published by Munich's Max Planck Institute; it contained the addresses given at a celebratory event on the occasion of Gerhard Schricker's retirement and Eugen Ulmer's 100th birthday. In the same year, the institute also dedicated to Schricker a comprehensive directory of publications by Max Planck Institute researchers. Two separate festschriften, one of which on the topic of Japanese copyright law, were punlished in 2005 to celebrate Schricker's 70th birthday.

== Positions ==
Schricker was opposed to attempts by German courts to impose a "threshold of creativity" (Gestaltungshöhe) requirement for the copyright protection of some categories of works, which he believed to raise the bar for protection in contravention of international and European law. In his view, not protecting works with a low degree of originality would constitute a "significant loss of substance" for copyright law, give rise to demarcation problems, and erode the foundation of substantial parts of the copyright industries.

Gerhard Schricker took a particular interest in the Europeanisation of copyright law, arguing that "the European Single Market necessarily requires a harmonised copyright law". He repeatedly criticised a "neglect" of authors' moral rights in the European discourse.

== Publications ==
In a 2003 article, Schricker's list of publications was described as comprising more than 300 individual items. A comprehensive list of works is contained in Ansgar Ohly's and others' festschrift in celebration of Schricker's 70th birthday.

=== Treatise on copyright ===
- Urheberrecht: Kommentar (1st edn, Beck 1987), 1561 pp [also as author of numerous sections therein; 2nd edn 1999, 2145 pp; 3rd edn 2006, 2657 pp; 4th edn 2010, edited by Ulrich Loewenheim, 2531 pp; 5th edn 2017, edited by Ulrich Loewenheim, Matthias Leistner, and Ansgar Ohly, 3184 pp; 6th edn 2020, edited by Ulrich Loewenheim, Matthias Leistner, and Ansgar Ohly, 3343 pp]

Schricker was the founding editor of a treatise on German copyright law (1st edn 1987). Editorial responsibility for the Schricker commentary was later (4th edn 2010) passed on to Ulrich Loewenheim, and the work continues to be updated on a regular basis (6th edn 2020). It is widely regarded as the leading academic treatise on German copyright law and has been praised as "the flagship of copyright law from its first edition". In reviews of the first edition, Haimo Schack called the work "brilliant" and Stig Strömholm described the treatise as among the books that as soon as one has become familiar with them, "one can no longer imagine how it had been possible to live and work without them".

=== Selected monographic works ===
- Die täuschende Werbung im italienischen Wettbewerbsrecht: Darstellung der Rechtslage in Italien im Vergleich zum deutschen Recht (Heymanns 1962), 241 pp [dissertation thesis]
- Gesetzesverletzung und Sittenverstoß: Rechtsvergleichende Untersuchung zur wettbewerbsrechtlichen Haftung bei Verletzung außerwettbewerbsrechtlicher Normen (Beck 1970), 298 pp [habilitation thesis]
- La répression de la concurrence déloyale dans les États membres de la Communauté Economique Euro : tome II/1 (Belgique, Luxembourg) (Dalloz 1974), with Bernard Francq and Detlef Wunderlich, 1039 pp
- La répression de la concurrence déloyale dans les États membres de la Communauté Economique Euro : tome V (Italie) (Dalloz 1975), 334 pp
- Verlagsrecht: Kommentar zum Gesetz über das Verlagsrecht vom 19.6.1901 (2nd edn, Beck 1984), with Theodor Maunz, 807 pp [3rd edn 2001, 880 pp; 1st edn 1952 by Walter Bappert and Theodor Maunz]
- Urheberrechtliche Probleme des Kabelrundfunks: Studie im Auftrag der Medienkommission der Länder zur wissenschaftlichen Begleitung der vier Kabelpilotprojekte (Nomos 1986), 114 pp
- Patent- und Urheberrecht an Hochschulen: Die Verwertung von Erfindungen und urheberrechtlich geschützten Werken an Hochschulen wissenschaftlich Tätiger (Nomos 1988), with Rudolf Kraßer, 194 pp

=== Selected edited works ===
- Recht der Werbung in Europa (edition ZAW 1990), 5 vols [1990–1991]
- Urheberrecht auf dem Weg zur Informationsgesellschaft (Nomos 1997), 287 pp
- International Encyclopedia of Comparative Law: Volume XIV (Copyright) (Brill 2007), with Eugen Ulmer
