= New Zealand Intellectual Property Journal =

- Discipline: Interllectual Property
- Language: English

Publication details
- History: 1995–present
- Frequency: Quarterly

Standard abbreviations
- ISO 4: N. Z. Intellect. Prop. J.

Indexing
- ISSN: 1359-9054

The New Zealand Intellectual Property Journal (ISSN 1359-9054) is a quarterly law review published by Butterworth since 1995. It is available on LexisNexisNZ and covers intellectual property law. The language of publication is English. The preferred abbreviation is: NZIPJ.

== See also ==
- List of intellectual property law journals
