= PCT Newsletter =

The PCT Newsletter is a monthly publication of the World Intellectual Property Organization (WIPO). It contains "up-to-date news about the Patent Cooperation Treaty (PCT)", which provides a system for filing international (patent) applications. The PCT Newsletter is published in English only. Important changes to the PCT are mentioned and explained in the PCT Newsletter.

The first issue of the PCT Newsletter was published in March 1994 on a subscription basis. Since January 1997, the issues are published online, free of charge. Since January 2008, the PCT Newsletter is available only online, and no longer as a paper publication.

== See also ==
- Official Journal of the European Patent Office
- List of intellectual property law journals
