= Journal of Intellectual Property Law & Practice =

The Journal of Intellectual Property Law & Practice is a monthly peer-reviewed law journal covering intellectual property law and practice, published by Oxford University Press. The journal was established in November 2005. Its founding editor-in-chief was Jeremy Phillips (Queen Mary Intellectual Property Research Institute). As of December 2025, the editors were Eleonora Rosati (Stockholm University and Bird & Bird), Stefano Barazza (Swansea University), and Marius Schneider. Contributions range from concise "Current Intelligence" articles, "Practice Points" focusing upon how to optimise a particular aspect of IP practice, as well as lengthier articles and book reviews. The journal is supplemented by a blog.

== See also ==
- List of intellectual property law journals
