= Journal of World Intellectual Property =

Peer-reviewed law journal

The Journal of World Intellectual Property is a peer-reviewed law journal covering international intellectual property law subjects, published by John Wiley & Sons. The journal is published three times a year (March, July, and November).

Contributions range from full articles to smaller notes. The journal specializes in all international and comparative aspects of intellectual property law, including trade, investment, technology, management, and enforcement of IP. It publishes historically in WTO and TRIPS articles, but it also publishes articles in other areas of IP law.

The journal was established in 1999. The current Editor in Chief is Dr Andres Guadamuz of the University of Sussex, and the Associate editors are Dr Alexandra Giannopoulou and Mr Sevki Karaduman.

== Metrics ==
The journal has an Impact Factor of 0.69, H-Index 12, and an SJR index of 0.257.

== See also ==
- List of intellectual property law journals
