= Gilsinho =

Gilsinho is the Portuguese diminutive of the name Gilson. Gilsinho may refer to:

- Gilsinho (footballer, born 1977), born Gílson Domingos Rezende Agostinho, Brazilian football striker
- Gilsinho (footballer, born 1981), born Gilson Adriano de Oliveira, Brazilian football midfielder
- Gilsinho (footballer, born 1984), born Gilson do Amaral, Brazilian football striker
