= Soil sealing =

Covering of soil surfaces

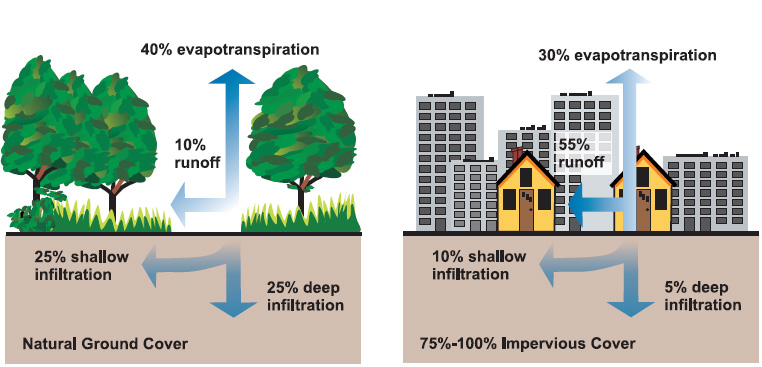
Comparison of natural ground cover with impervious urban construction

Soil sealing or soil surface sealing is the loss of soil resources due to the covering of land for housing, roads or other construction work. Covering or replacing the topsoil with impervious materials like asphalt and cement as a result of urban development and infrastructure construction paired with compaction of the underlying soil layers results in the mostly irreversible loss of relevant soil ecosystem services. The global rise in population has heightened the need for soil sealing, which in turn leads to the degradation of land. Sealed land is a serious form of land take (use of land specifically for building settlements, roads, and businesses). Soil sealing and land take together leads to the complete loss of soil functions, including its biological, physical and chemical properties.

== Impacts ==
Replacing natural soil with man-made surfaces greatly affects the process of water infiltration. These artificial surfaces don't allow water to seep through as easily as soil does, leading to increased surface runoff. Additionally, sealing the soil for underground construction alters water movement, further diminishing the soil's natural ability to purify water. In cities, having lots of heat-absorbing concrete and asphalt but not enough cooling vegetation creates heat islands effect.

Using human-made materials to cover soil significantly affects its ability to provide essential services like food production. This occurs when fertile agricultural land is converted into buildings and houses. Countries with rapidly growing populations and economies are experiencing notable loss of agricultural land due to development.

Soil sealing affects the soil's function as a natural habitat. By completely covering the uppermost layer of soil with man-made substances, it creates fragmented habitats for local biodiversity. Consequently, this leads to soil biodiversity loss. Further, these impacts worsen with a decrease in the soil's carbon and nitrogen content, as well as its respiration rate.

Soil's intangible benefits such as spiritual connection, learning, and feeling like we belong to this place, are at risk because land take and soil sealing for urban projects are removing recreational spaces in city centers. The impact on cultural services becomes apparent when people worldwide are willing to invest more money in homes located in areas with natural surroundings.

== Assessment ==
Various methods are employed globally to evaluate soil sealing. Some of the methods are

- Wet sieving tests
- Raindrop impact tests under field and laboratory conditions
- Penetration resistance (PR)
- Consistency Index (C5–10)
- Soil stability Index (StI)
- Crusting Index (CI)
- Normalized difference vegetation index (NDVI)
- Normalized Difference Built-up Index (NDBI)
- Soil Adjusted Vegetation Index (SAVI)

== Soil unsealing ==
A complete soil unsealing process involves entirely removing any human-made materials like asphalt and cement that obstruct the soil's natural functions, thereby restoring its ability to perform its natural processes. There is very limited research about the process of soil unsealing. Due to mostly irreversible losses, soil unsealing is very difficult. However, by following some steps soil unsealing is feasible.

- Transforming urban, barren, or previously used dumping soils into spaces for urban parks, green roofs, and gardens. However, it's essential that the soil is thoroughly decontaminated before any such use to ensure the safety of the environment and the health of those who will be using these spaces. This technique aligns with a European research project in urban planning that emphasizes minimizing construction in green areas and reusing existing industrial sites known as brownfields.
- Removing sealed surfaces or buildings to offset the environmental impact of upcoming new urban projects. This approach is employed in the Walloon Region and Germany, where the "no net land take" principle ensures that urban development plans do not result in a net increase in land usage.

A field trial in Palermo, Italy, applying minimal-disturbance de-sealing techniques to long-sealed urban soils found that vegetated rehabilitation stabilised water infiltration and increased microbial activity over eighteen months, while crushed-asphalt treatments preserved higher permeability but supported less vegetation cover.

== See also ==
- Soil compaction
- Land consumption
- Impervious surface
