= Cybaris =

- Discipline: Intellectual property law, American law
- Language: English

Publication details
- History: 2010–present
- Publisher: Mitchell Hamline School of Law
- Frequency: Biannually

Standard abbreviations
- Bluebook: Cybaris Intell. Prop. L. Rev.
- ISO 4: Cybaris

Links
- Journal homepage

Cybaris: An Intellectual Property Law Review is a biannual law review published by Mitchell Hamline School of Law. It was established in 2010 and focuses on intellectual property law. Cybaris was featured in an article published by Patently-O. The founding editors-in-chief were Jennell Bilek and Ryan C. Smith (2010). The current editor-in-chief is Molly R. Littman.

Cybaris has its own searchable database in Westlaw (CYBARIS), and is included Westlaw's index of law reviews (TP-ALL).

== See also ==
- List of intellectual property law journals
- William Mitchell College of Law
- Mitchell Hamline School of Law
