= Annals of Library and Information Studies =

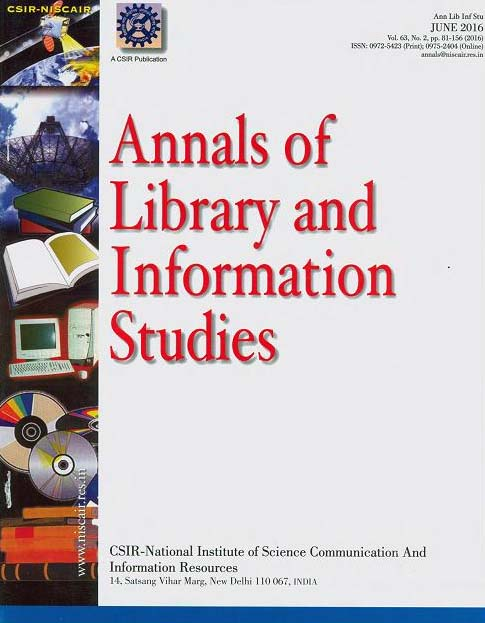
- Language: English
- Edited by: G. Mahesh

Publication details
- History: 1954–present
- Publisher: National Institute of Science Communication and Information Resources (India)
- Frequency: Quarterly
- Open access: Yes

Standard abbreviations
- ISO 4: Ann. Libr. Inf. Stud.

Indexing
- ISSN: 0972-5423 (print); 0975-2404 (web)
- OCLC no.: 607675250

Links
- Journal homepage

Annals of Library and Information Studies is a quarterly journal in library and information studies publishing original papers, survey reports, reviews, short communications, and letters pertaining to library science, information science and computer applications in these fields. It is an open access academic journal, published since 1954 by the CSIR-National Institute of Science Communication and Information Resources, formerly the Indian National Scientific Documentation Centre.

It covers library and information science, scientometrics, and documentation and is listed in Library and Information Science: A Guide to Key Literature and Sources.

== Editors-in-chief ==
The following persons have been or are editor-in-chief:

- S. R. Ranganathan (1954–1963)
- S. Parthasarathy (1964–1972)
- B. Guha (1973–1984)
- T. N. Rajan (1985–1987)
- B.K. Sen (1988–1989)
- S.I. Islam (1990)
- J.K. Ahluwalia (1991–1993)
- S.B. Ghosh (1994–1997)
- J.L. Sardana (1998–2000)
- Renu Arora (2001–2011)
- G. Mahesh (2012–present))

== History ==
At its founding, the journal was titled Annals of Library Science. In 1964, the name was changed to Annals of Library Science and Documentation. The current title was assigned in 2001.

The founding editor was S.R. Ranganathan, who contributed to about 50% of the articles during 1954 to 1963.

== Abstracting and indexing ==
- FRANCIS
- Indian Library and Information Science Abstracts (India)
- Library and Information Science Abstracts
- Library, Information Science & Technology Abstracts, as a Core Journal, 03/01/2004 to present
- PASCAL
- Scopus 2011 to present indexed

== See also ==
- Open access in India
