= World Intellectual Property Review =

Intellectual property law magazine

- Categories: Publishing, Intellectual Property
- Company: Newton Media
- Based in: London, UK
- Website: www.worldipreview.com

The World Intellectual Property Review (WIPR) is a bimonthly magazine providing news and analysis on issues in intellectual property. Between July 2011 and June 2012, the average number of copies per issue was about 5,200. All copies were distributed for free. The magazine is published since 2006 by Newton Media Ltd, which also publishes the World Intellectual Property Review Annual, a guide to "intellectual property developments in the past year." WIPR is not indexed in any major legal periodicals database, such as Web of Science, Scopus, Dimensions, lens.org, World Wide Science, Open Alex, etc.

== See also ==
- List of intellectual property law journals
