= The Trademark Reporter =

- Discipline: Business law
- Language: English

Publication details
- History: 1911–present
- Frequency: Bimonthly

Standard abbreviations
- Bluebook: Trademark Rep.
- ISO 4: Trademark Report.

Indexing
- ISSN: 0041-056X

Links
- Journal homepage

The Trademark Reporter is a bimonthly peer-reviewed academic journal covering trademark law and related topics. It was first established in 1911 and is published by the International Trademark Association. Articles published by the journal have been cited by different courts.

== See also ==
- List of intellectual property law journals
