= Gillson =

Gillson is a surname. Notable people with this surname include:

- Bob Gillson (1905–1992), American football player
- Kevin Gillson, convicted American teenage sex offender
- Malca Gillson (1926–2010), Canadian filmmaker

== See also ==
- Gilson
