= Mitteilungen der deutschen Patentanwälte =

German intellectual property law journal

- Frequency: Monthly
- Founded: 1934
- Country: Germany
- Language: German

Mitteilungen der deutschen Patentanwälte (English: Bulletin of the German patent attorneys) is a monthly intellectual property law journal published in German, since 1934. The publisher is the Chamber of German Patent Attorneys (German: Vorstand der Patentanwaltskammer).

== See also ==
- List of intellectual property law journals
