= Official Journal of the European Patent Office =

The Official Journal of the European Patent Office (OJ EPO) is a monthly trilingual publication of the European Patent Office (EPO). It contains "notices and information of a general character issued by the President of the European Patent Office, as well as any other information relevant to [the European Patent Convention (EPC)] or its implementation". The Official Journal is published in German, English and French, the three official languages of the EPO. The three texts coexist in the same issue of the journal. The journal is published on the last day of the month.

== History ==
The first issue of the Official Journal of the EPO was published in December 1977, two months after the European Patent Convention entered into force on October 7, 1977. The first issue starts with a foreword by Johannes Bob van Benthem, the first President of the EPO.

Until 2014, the Official Journal was published both on paper and online. On January 1, 2014, the paper edition was discontinued; only the online edition remains (free of charge). In addition, as from 2014, the articles are no longer referenced by their page number, but carry a reference number starting with "A", e.g. OJ EPO 2014, A12. In 2016, the Official Journal editorial office moved from the EPO Munich office to its Vienna office.

== Publication of decisions of the Boards of Appeal ==
Only specific decisions of the Boards of Appeal of the EPO are published in the Official Journal:

- the decisions of the Enlarged Board of Appeal (in practice, opinions of the Enlarged Board of Appeal are published as well);
- as of 2002, individual decisions of the boards of appeal on the initiative of the board concerned.

Other decisions are published on the EPO web site.

== See also ==
- PCT Newsletter
- List of intellectual property law journals
- Official Journal of the European Union
