= Tulane Journal of Technology and Intellectual Property =

- A typical JTIP cover.
- Discipline: Intellectual property law
- Language: English

Publication details
- History: founded in 1997
- Publisher: Tulane University Law School (USA)
- Frequency: Annual

Standard abbreviations
- Bluebook: Tul. J. Tech. & Intell. Prop.
- ISO 4: Tulane J. Technol. Intellect. Prop.

Indexing
- ISSN: 1533-3531

Links
- Journal homepage

The Tulane Journal of Technology and Intellectual Property (JTIP) is a student-edited journal of the Tulane University Law School. JTIP examines legal issues relating to technology, including topics such as antitrust, computer law, contracts, constitutional law, copyrights, information privacy, patents, torts, trade secrets, trademarks, and all other policy implications of law and technology in society.

== Membership ==
JTIP's editorial members are second- and third-year law students who work under the guidance of faculty advisors. Membership is determined by an annual write-on competition.

=== 2025-2026 Board ===
- Editor in Chief: Navya Kolli
- Senior Managing Editor: Samuel Montanari
- Senior Notes & Comments Editor: Leielani Ealey
- Senior Articles Editor: Peyton Friedlander
- Senior Business Editor: Isa Reyes-Klein

=== 2022-2023 Board ===
- Editor in Chief: Hayley LeBlanc
- Senior Managing Editor: Harry Phillips
- Senior Notes & Comments Editor: Hong Nguyen
- Senior Articles Editor: Caroline Wippman
- Senior Business Editor: Marissa Kinsey

=== 2021-2022 Board ===
- Editor in Chief: Kaitlyn Rodnick
- Senior Managing Editor: Charlie Jonas
- Senior Notes & Comments Editor: Gabrielle Balasquide
- Senior Articles Editor: Rebecca Alba
- Senior Business Editor: Sarah Hunt-Blackwell

=== 2016-2017 Board ===
- Editor in Chief: Casey Ebner
- Senior Articles Editor: Jake Kronish

=== 2015-2016 Board ===
- Editor in Chief: Alexandra Triana
- Senior Managing Editor: Joshua Mastracci
- Senior Notes & Comments Editor: Alexandrea Kinzinger
- Senior Articles Editor: Lillian Grappe
- Senior Business Editor: Kyle Sutton
- Senior Symposium Editor: Caitlin Poor
- Senior Communications Editor: Toni Xu

=== 2011-2012 Board ===
- Editor in Chief: Chad Sanders
- Senior Managing Editor: Matthew DeIulio
- Senior Notes & Comments Editor: Russell Withers
- Senior Business Editor: Jacklina Len
- Senior Communications Editor: Brooke Childers

== Significant articles ==
- Thomas P. Haggerty (2006). "Note, "A Blue Note: The Sixth Circuit, Product Design and the Confusion Doctrines in Gibson Guitar Corp. v. Paul Reed Smith Guitars, LP 8 Tul". J. of Tech. & Intell. Prop. Vol. 219.

== See also ==
- Intellectual property law
- List of intellectual property law journals
- Tulane University Law School
