= Gelson =

Gelson is a Portuguese-language masculine given name.

== People with the given name Gelson ==
- Gelson Domingos da Silva (c.1965 – 2011), Brazilian TV cameraman killed while reporting
- Gelson Fernandes (born 1986), Swiss footballer
- Joseph Gelson Gregson (1835–1909), English Baptist missionary to India
- Gelson Martins (born 1995), Portuguese footballer
- Gelson Rodrigues (born 1982), Brazilian footballer
- Gelson Silva (born 1967), Brazilian football manager
- Gelson Singh (born 1994), Indian cricketer

== People nicknamed Gelson ==
- Geraldo dos Santos Júnior (born 1979), Brazilian footballer known as Gelson
- Jacinto Muondo "Gelson" Dala (born 1996), Angolan footballer

== See also ==
- Gelson's Markets, supermarket chain in California, US
