= Science Reporter =

- Editor: Hasan Jawaid Khan
- Categories: Popular science
- Frequency: Monthly
- Publisher: Council of Scientific and Industrial Research
- Founded: 1964
- Country: India
- Language: English
- ISSN: 0036-8512
- OCLC: 4782353

Science Reporter is a monthly popular science magazine that has been published in India since 1964 by the National Institute of Science Communication and Information Resources, a government agency based in New Delhi. It is published in English and is read principally in India and neighbouring countries.

The magazine was originally intended to make citizens aware of the research taking place in various scientific institutions in the country. It has now outgrown this initial agenda, becoming a popular science magazine that covers many national and international science issues. There are reports of current interest, as well as essays written by eminent national scientists on modern technologies, the country's science policy, and the like. Regular columns on science fiction, puzzles, hobby projects, crosswords are also present.

== Open Access ==
The journal is available under open access after six months of the print publication.
