= Journal of Intellectual Property and Entertainment Law =

- Discipline: Law
- Language: English
- Edited by: Student board

Publication details
- Former names: IP and Entertainment Law Ledger
- History: 2011–present
- Publisher: New York University School of Law (United States)
- Frequency: Biannual

Standard abbreviations
- Bluebook: N.Y.U. J. Intell. Prop. & Ent. L.
- ISO 4: J. Intellect. Prop. Entertain. Law

Indexing
- ISSN: 2324-6286

Links
- Journal homepage

The New York University Journal of Intellectual Property and Entertainment Law (or JIPEL) is a student-edited law review at New York University School of Law. The journal publishes articles, essays, notes, and commentary that cover a wide range of topics in intellectual property law and entertainment law.

JIPEL was first published by NYU's Intellectual Property and Entertainment Law Society in 2009 as the IP and Entertainment Law Ledger, before being spun off as an independent journal in 2011. It features articles and essays on legal topics by practitioners and academics, as well as notes, case comments, and book annotations written by journal members.

JIPEL publishes two issues per year on diverse topics in intellectual property and entertainment law. Past articles have been cited in criminal cases and Supreme Court filings. It was recognized both in and out of legal circles in 2020 for publishing a legal article co-authored by the rapper Pitbull.
