= Johanna Gibson =

Johanna Gibson is Herchel Smith Professor of Intellectual Property Law in the Centre for Commercial Law Studies, Queen Mary, University of London.

Her research centers around intellectual property law, cultural theory, traditional knowledge, animal law and development. She is the Editor-in-Chief of the Queen Mary Journal of Intellectual Property and was the founder of the journal.

Until January 2009, Johanna was also a team member of the intellectual property blog, IPKat, along with Jeremy Phillips, Ilanah Simon and David Pearce.

== Selected recent publications ==
- Owned, An Ethological Jurisprudence of Property. From the Cave to the Commons, Routledge, 2019, ISBN 978-0367356576;
- Intellectual Property, Medicine and Health, Routledge, 2017 (2nd Ed)ISBN 9780367593780;
- The Logic of Innovation: Intellectual Property, and What the User Found There, Routledge, 2014 ISBN 9781409454175
- Creating Selves: Intellectual Property and the Narration of Culture, Aldershot: Ashgate, 2006 ISBN 0-7546-4707-2;
- Community Resources: Intellectual Property, International Trade and Protection of Traditional Knowledge, Aldershot: Ashgate Publishing, 2005, 387, ISBN 0-7546-4436-7;
