= Jamie Gilson =

American children's writer (1933–2020)

- Born: July 4, 1933; Beardstown, Illinois
- Died: February 11, 2020 (aged 86); Wilmette, Illinois
- Occupation: Writer
- Writing career
- Period: 1970s-present
- Genre: Children
- Website: www.jamiegilson.com

Jamie Marie Gilson (née Chisam; July 4, 1933 – February 11, 2020) was an American author of twenty-one children's books. Explaining her approach to writing, Gilson said, "I watch what kids are doing and write stories based on what I see.

== Life ==
Gilson was born in Beardstown, Illinois on July 4, 1933. She lived in several Midwestern towns growing up, including Boonville, Missouri, Pittsfield, Illinois, Independence, Missouri, and Oak Park, Illinois. In 1951, she graduated from Oak Park and River Forest High School in Oak Park, Illinois. She attended the University of Missouri and graduated from Northwestern University’s School of Speech.

She was married to trademark attorney Jerome Gilson and has three adult children, Tom, Matthew and Anne. She lived in a suburb of Chicago for most of her life.

She died on February 11, 2020, at her home in Wilmette, Illinois, at 86 years old.

== Career ==
Gilson taught junior high school for a year, then wrote, produced, and acted in educational radio programs for radio station WBEZ in Chicago. Next, she wrote commercials for radio station WFMT in Chicago, as well as writing films and film strips for Encyclopædia Britannica Films. Gilson also wrote the monthly “Goods” column and other articles for Chicago magazine for ten years. She published her first book for children in 1978, Harvey the Beer Can King. Her final book, My Teacher is an Idiom, was published August 25, 2015.

== Books ==
Most of Gilson's books were humorous contemporary fiction set in Illinois, with the exception of Stink Alley, a story of the Pilgrims set in seventeenth-century Holland. Sam Mott, the sixth-grade narrator of her book Do Bananas Chew Gum?, comes to terms with his dyslexia, and Harvey Trumble, a seventh-grader, encounters some difficulties trying to Americanize a young Vietnamese refugee in Hello, My Name is Scrambled Eggs. Drawing on her own experience as an award-winner at the Pillsbury Bake-Off in 1954 for her "American Piece-A-Pie" recipe, her Can't Catch Me, I'm the Gingerbread Man features twelve-year-old Mitch McDandel, the only male contestant in a national bake-a-thon. In Thirteen Ways to Sink a Sub, the girls and boys in Room 4B compete to see who can make their substitute teacher cry first. Several of her books (including 4B Goes Wild, the sequel to Thirteen Ways) feature the adventures of fifth-grader Hobie Hanson, and her most recent books center on Richard and Patrick, second graders in Mrs. Zookey's class. Gilson got many of her ideas from her local elementary school, Central School in Wilmette, Illinois, attended by each of her three children.

== Acclaim ==
Jamie Gilson received many awards for her children's books. In 2005, she received the Prairie State Award for Excellence in Writing for Children, presented by the Illinois Reading Council. She received the Society of Midland Authors Award for Children's Fiction for her book Stink Alley in 2003. In 1981, Gilson received the Carl Sandburg Award from the Friends of the Chicago Public Library for her book Do Bananas Chew Gum? Previous honorees include David Mamet, John Updike, Henry Louis Gates Jr., Kurt Vonnegut and Joyce Carol Oates.

Gilson also received several children-voted awards for Thirteen Ways to Sink a Sub, including the Buckeye Children's Book Award in 1987, the Pacific Northwest Young Reader's Choice Award in 1985, and the Sequoyah Book Award in 1985. She received the Charlie May Simon Award, also child-voted, for Do Bananas Chew Gum? in 1981.

== Bibliography ==
- My Teacher is an Idiom (2015)
- Chess! I Love It! I Love It! I Love It! (2008)
- Gotcha! (2006)
- Stink Alley (2002)
- Bug in a Rug (1998)
- Wagon Train 911 (1996)
- It Goes Eeeeeeeeeeeee! (1994)
- Soccer Circus (1993)
- You Cheat! (1992)
- Sticks and Stones and Skeleton Bones (1991)
- Itchy Richard (1990)
- Greatest Hero of the Mall (1989)
- Double Dog Dare (1988)
- Hobie Hanson, You're Weird (1985)
- Hello, My Name is Scrambled Eggs (1985)
- 4B Goes Wild (1983)
- Thirteen Ways to Sink a Sub (1982)
- Can't Catch Me, I'm the Gingerbread Man (1981)
- Do Bananas Chew Gum (1980)
- Dial Leroi Rupert, DJ (1979)
- Harvey the Beer Can King (1978)
