= German Association for the Protection of Intellectual Property =

Professional association

The German Association for the Protection of Intellectual Property (German: Deutsche Vereinigung für gewerblichen Rechtsschutz und Urheberrecht, or GRUR e. V.) is a German professional association "concerned with the protection of intellectual property rights". It was founded in 1891 and publishes:

- Gewerblicher Rechtsschutz und Urheberrecht (GRUR),
- Gewerblicher Rechtsschutz und Urheberrecht, Rechtsprechungs-Report (GRUR-RR),
- GRUR International

== See also ==
- Intellectual property organization
