= Fleet Street Reports =

- Discipline: Intellectual property law, British law
- Language: English

Publication details
- History: 1963–present
- Frequency: Monthly

Standard abbreviations
- ISO 4: Fleet Str. Rep.

Indexing
- ISSN: 0141-9455

The Fleet Street Reports: Cases in Intellectual Property Law (ISSN 0141-9455) is a monthly journal published by Sweet & Maxwell since 1963 and covering intellectual property law. The language of publication is English.

== See also ==
- List of intellectual property law journals
