= Intellectual Property and Technology Forum =

- Type: Law Journal
- School: Boston College Law School
- Editor-in-chief: William W. Shields IV
- Managing editor: Elizabeth O'Brien
- Headquarters: 885 Centre St, Newton, MA 02459
- Website: bciptf.org

The Intellectual Property & Technology Forum & Journal, (Boston Coll. Intell. Prop. & Tech. F.), at Boston College Law School is an academic journal dedicated to technology law and intellectual property.

The journal publishes an online blog and a legal publication called the Intellectual Property and Technology Forum Journal, which is currently ranked in the Washington and Lee School of Law Law Journal Rankings. The journal publishes two issues each year, and is designed, edited and published by second and third-year law students.
