= Journal of Intellectual Property Rights =

- Discipline: Intellectual property law
- Language: English
- Edited by: Kanika Malik

Publication details
- History: 1996–present
- Publisher: National Institute of Science Communication and Information Resources
- Frequency: Bimonthly

Standard abbreviations
- ISO 4: J. Intellect. Prop. Rights

Indexing
- ISSN: 0971-7544 (print); 0975-1076 (web)

Links
- Journal homepage

The Journal of Intellectual Property Rights is a bimonthly peer-reviewed law journal covering intellectual property law that is published by the Indian National Institute of Science Communication and Information Resources. The journal was established in 1996 and publishes contributed and invited articles, case studies, patent reviews, technical notes on current IPR issues, literature reviews, world literature on intellectual property rights, national and international news, book reviews, and conference reports covering topics on trademarks, patents, copyright law, trade secrets, and internet law. The journal is abstracted and indexed in Scopus. The editor-in-chief is Kanika Malik.

== See also ==
- List of intellectual property law journals
