= National Institute of Science Communication and Information Resources =

Information science institute in New Delhi, India

Coordinates: 28.639°N 77.173°E

National Institute of Science Communication and Information Resources

The National Institute of Science Communication and Information Resources (NISCAIR), located at New Delhi, India, was an information science institute in India founded in 2002. In 2021, the institute was merged with National Institute of Science, Technology and Development Studies to form National Institute of Science Communication and Policy Research (NIScPR). It operated under the umbrella of the Council of Scientific and Industrial Research (CSIR) that comprise 38 other labs and institutes in India. The institute published several academic journals and magazines.

== History ==
In 2002, the Indian Scientific Documentation Centre (INSDOC), which came into being in 1952 under CSIR, was merged with NISCOM in 2002, to form National Institute of Science Communication and Information Resources (NISCAIR).

== General services ==
- E-Publishing
- Editing
- Indexing
- Print & Production
- Herbarium Techniques
- Taxonomical Identification of Plants
- Identification of crude Plants-based products
- Contents, Abstracts and Photocopy Service (CAPS)
- CSIR Knowledge Gateway
- Document Copy Supply Services
- Literature Search Services
- ISSN
- Short term courses in Science Communication, Digital Libraries, Information Technology and Library Automations etc.
- Translation Services
- Training Programmes

== National Science Library services ==
- Reader's Service
- Technical Query Service
- Copying Service
- Inter Library Loan Service
- e-Journals Access
- National Science Digital Library nsdl
- Traditional Knowledge Digital Library

== Open access ==
18 journals and 3 popular science magazines (Science Reporter and its Hindi and Urdu editions) published by CSIR-NISCAIR are available as open access from the NISCAIR Online Periodicals Repository website.

=== List of publications ===
Academic journals

- Annals of Library and Information Studies (ALIS)
- Applied Innovative Research (AIR)
- Bharatiya Vaigyanik evam Audyogik Anusandhan Patrika (BVAAP)
- Indian Journal of Biochemistry and Biophysics (IJBB)
- Indian Journal of Biotechnology (IJBT)
- Indian Journal of Chemistry, Section A (IJCA)
- Indian Journal of Chemistry, Section B (IJCB)
- Indian Journal of Chemical Technology (IJCT)
- Indian Journal of Experimental Biology (IJEB)
- Indian Journal of Engineering and Materials Sciences (IJEMS)
- Indian Journal of Fibre & Textile Research (IJFTR)
- Indian Journal of Geo-Marine Sciences (IJMS)
  - Formerly Indian Journal of Marine Sciences
- Indian Journal of Natural Products and Resources (IJNPR)
  - Formerly Natural Product Radiance (NPR)
- Indian Journal of Pure & Applied Physics (IJPAP)
- Indian Journal of Radio & Space Physics (IJRSP)
- Indian Journal of Traditional Knowledge (IJTK)
- Journal of Intellectual Property Rights (JIPR)
- Journal of Scientific and Industrial Research (JSIR)
- Journal of Scientific Temper (JST)

Magazines

- Science Reporter (SR)
- Vigyan Pragati (VP)
- Science Ki Duniya (SKD)

Repository

- Natural Products Repository (NPARR)

== Associateship in Information Science (AIS) ==
NISCAIR offered Associateship in Information Science (AIS), a two-year master's degree level professional programme, earlier.
