= International Review of Intellectual Property and Competition Law =

- Discipline: Intellectual property law, patent law, trade mark law, copyright law, competition law
- Language: English
- Edited by: Reto M. Hilty, Josef Drexl

Publication details
- Former names: International Review of Industrial Property and Copyright Law
- History: 1970–present
- Publisher: Springer Science+Business Media on behalf of the Max Planck Institute for Innovation and Competition
- Frequency: 8/year

Standard abbreviations
- ISO 4: Int. Rev. Intellect. Prop. Compet. Law

Indexing
- ISSN: 0018-9855
- LCCN: 72201100
- OCLC no.: 605895392

Links
- Journal homepage; Journal page at publisher's website; Online archive

The International Review of Intellectual Property and Competition Law is a peer-reviewed academic journal published by Springer Science+Business Media on behalf of the Max Planck Institute for Innovation and Competition. It was established in 1970 and covers worldwide developments in intellectual property and competition law. In addition, the journal also covers decisions and leading cases from jurisdictions around the world, as well as editorials, opinions, reports, case notes, and book reviews. The editors-in-chief are Reto M. Hilty and Josef Drexl (Max Planck Institute for Innovation and Competition).

== Abstracting and indexing ==
The journal is abstracted and indexed in:

- Emerging Sources Citation Index
- International Bibliography of Periodical Literature
- Scopus

== See also ==
- List of intellectual property law journals
