= Yle FSR =

Swedish-language Finnish radio department

- Type: Division
- Industry: Entertainment
- Parent: Yle

Yle FSR (Finlands Svenska Radio) was the Swedish-language radio department of Finland's national broadcaster Yle (Yleisradio).

The department is responsible for the Swedish-language radio stations of Yle; the speech station Radio Vega and the pop music station Radio X3M. Both these channels are available in areas of Finland where the Swedish-speaking minority is found (mainly the coastal areas). In some parts of the country without a strong Swedish-speaking presence, Radio Vega can be received.

Some programmes of FSR's channels are also simulcast on Yle's international radio channel, Radio Finland.

== See also ==
- Media of Finland
