= Intellectual Property Institute (United Kingdom) =

The Intellectual Property Institute (IPI), or IP Institute, is a British non-profit making organisation with the mission of promoting "awareness and understanding of intellectual property law". The Institute has a thirty-year history of intellectual property and economics research. The current director of the Institute is Professor Johanna Gibson who was appointed April 2010.

In 1982 Hugh Brett wrote that the "primary objective of the Institute will be to provide the facilities for research into the relevance and reform of intellectual property law. It is not possible to meet the needs of industry and the demands of innovation without a proper research centre. West Germany, for example, has the famous Max Planck Institute in Munich, with some 50,000 books, and a budget of over one million pounds per year, largely provided by government. A beginning has to be made……"

It was formally dissolved on 21 October 2014. (Ref UK Companies House)
