= Kevin Gillson =

Kevin Gillson is a man who, as a teenager in Port Washington, Wisconsin, attracted national attention when he was sentenced as a sex offender for a consensual act with his girlfriend.

== Description ==
She described him as her "Romeo" and stated, "Thanks to the court system, I have lost the love of my life and the father of my unborn baby." A juror in the case said, "We were led to believe that we only had one choice, the way it was presented to us. We had a copy of the law, and they both said they did it and that was our only choice."

The 2nd District Court of Appeals in Waukesha allowed the verdict to stand, but legislation inspired by Gillson's case changed the law to let judges decide whether teenagers 18 or younger convicted of sex crimes must register with police as sex offenders. Circuit Judge Tom Wolfgram subsequently removed Gillson from the sex offender registry.
