= Gilson (footballer, born 1991) =

São Toméan footballer

Personal information
- Full name: Gilson Pereira do Espirito Santos
- Position: Defender

Team information
- Current team: Porto Real

Senior career*
Years	Team	Apps	(Gls)
- Porto Real

International career^{‡}
2015–	São Tomé and Príncipe	2	(0)
- * Club domestic league appearances and goals ‡ National team caps and goals as of 24 March 2018

Gilson Pereira do Espirito Santo (born 25 October 1991), simply known as Gilson, is a São Toméan footballer who plays as a defender for FC Porto Real and the São Tomé and Príncipe national team.

== International career ==
Gilson made his international debut for São Tomé and Príncipe in 2015.
