= Gelson Domingos da Silva =

Brazilian camera operator

- Born: c. 1965
- Died: 6 November 2011; Rio de Janeiro
- Cause of death: Gunfire
- Occupation: TV camera operator
- Known for: Crime images
- Television: Rede Bandeirantes, Rede Record, & Sistema Brasileiro de Televisão
- Spouse: Married
- Children: 3
- Awards: Vladimir Herzog Prize for Amnesty and Human Rights

Gelson Domingos da Silva (c. 1965 – 6 November 2011), a Brazilian camera operator for the Rede Bandeirantes TV network, died while covering a drug bust in Rio de Janeiro as the government of Brazil prepared for its hosting of the 2016 Summer Olympics. Domingos was the first Brazilian journalist to die in this type of crime setting in Brazil.

== Personal Information ==
Domingos was 46 years old at the time of his death. He was married to Fabiana Domingo, and he had three children, Gabriela, Lorena and Gelson Junior, and 2 grandchildren, Emily and Julie, from his previous marriage at the time of his death. He was buried at the Memorial do Carmo, in Caju.

== Career ==
Domingos was a TV camera operator for the radio and TV group Rede Bandeirantes, which is often referred to as TV Band for short. He was considered by the press freedom organizations to be a veteran and had previously worked at the Brazilian Television System, or Sistema Brasileiro de Televisão (SBT), and the Record.

== Death ==
Gelson Domingos da Silva was killed in Rio de Janeiro, Brazil.

Domingos was shot in the chest by a high caliber bullet and killed while covering a drug raid at the Antares favela. on the west side of Rio de Janeiro. What began that morning as a raid turned into a fierce shootout between the 80 military-trained soldiers who conducted the operation and the drug traffickers. Although Domingos was protected by a bullet proof vest during the operation, it was not of the strong quality that was used by the authorities. It is against Brazilian law for media personnel or others to wear the high-tech protection vests that the police and military wear. Police arrested 9 suspects, which included a minor, and believed that one of them was the gunman who killed Domingos, but four other suspects were killed, and it may have been one of them who killed Domingos. Police will be reviewing the video taken by Domingos to determine the killer. Afterwards police seized marijuana, cocaine, communications equipment and a weapons cache from the site.

The operation began at 6:30 a.m. and Domingos was dead on arrival at the hospital at 7:40 a.m. Ernani Alves was the reporter who was working with Domingos for a TV Band report.

== Context ==
The Brazilian authorities had been conducting more of these crime sweep operations, especially around the sports facilities, before hosting the FIFA World Cup in 2014 and the World Olympics held 2 years afterwards.

== Reactions ==
The military expressed its regret that the Brazilian camera operator died during the raid. Brazilian Association of Investigative Journalism said the authorities should be responsible for protecting journalists who cover their operations. The union of journalists, however, blamed TV Band: "Bullet-proof vests are not safe against the weapons used by the drug traffickers and police," said the union's leader.

Reporters Without Borders said, "Security policy feeds on media coverage and this dependence is fraught with risks for journalists working in the favelas, where some of them also live. The security of all concerned – journalists, witnesses and residents – takes priority over a results-based culture or a drive for image."

== Awards ==
- 2009 Vladimir Herzog Award (Vladimir Herzog de Anistia e Direitos Humanos) for a TV Documentary about murders in northern Brazil.
