= Flood Studies Report =

Replaced the Flood Estimation Handbook in UK

The Flood Studies Report, published in 1975, is used in relation to rainfall events in the United Kingdom. It has since been replaced by the Flood Estimation Handbook, but the method can still be used.

== Calculation procedure ==
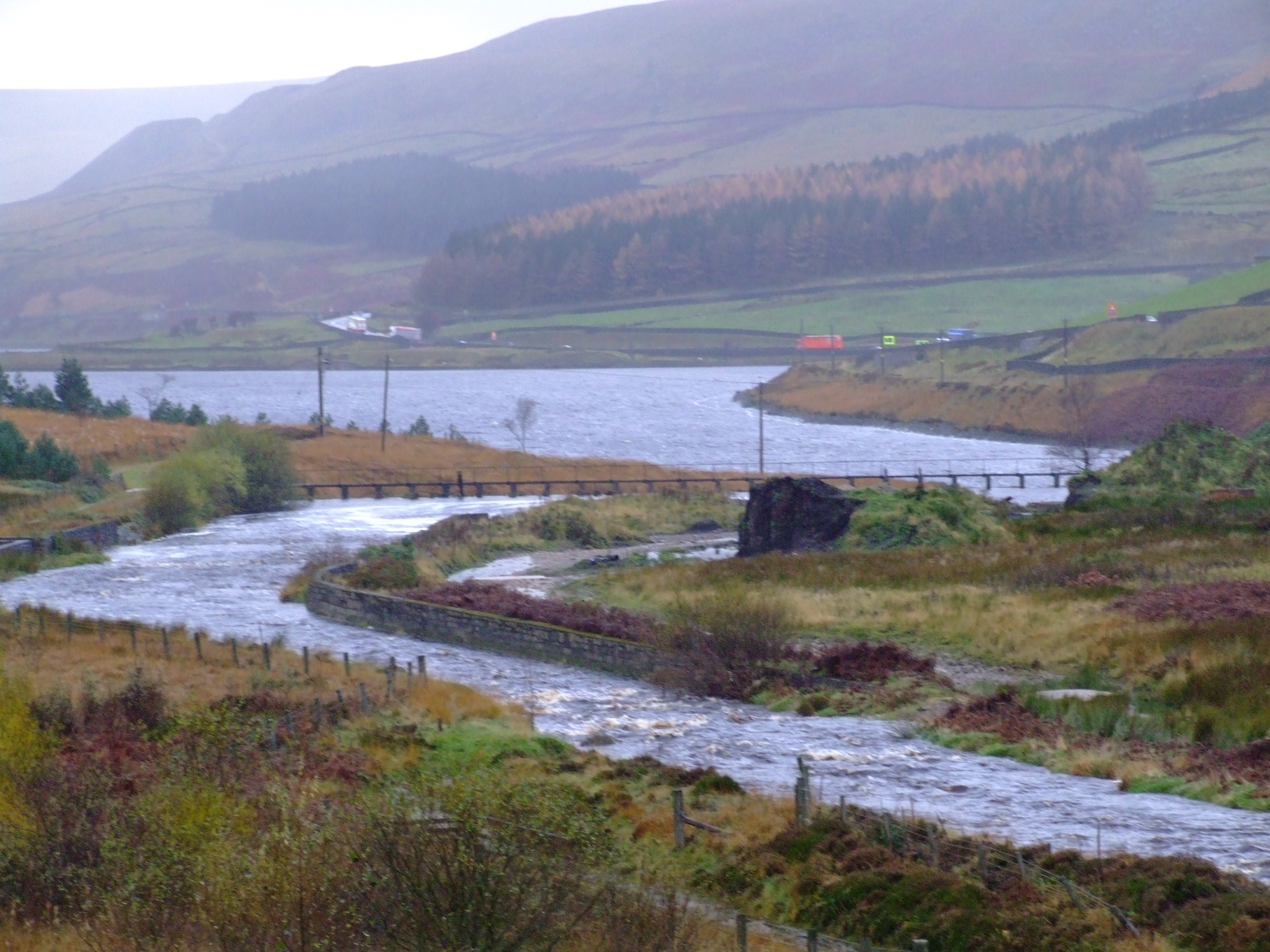
Rainfall on a rural catchment in Longdendale, Derbyshire.

It is possible to use the FSR to predict the depth of rainfall from a storm of a given duration and return period. The FSR includes values for two key variables mapped across the UK: the M5-60 minutes rainfall, and the ratio "r".

- M5-60 minutes rainfall is the expected depth of rainfall in millimetres (mm) from a storm lasting 60 minutes (1 hour) with a return period of 5 years (hence M5).
- M5-2 days rainfall is the expected depth of rainfall from a storm lasting 2 days (48 hours) with a return period of 5 years.
- The dimensionless ratio "r" is the M5-60 minutes value divided by the M5-2 days value.
- Factor Z1 is interpolated from figures based on the values of M5-2 days and "r".
- Factor Z2 (the growth factor) is found from the M5 rainfall depth, and depends on the return period.
- The Areal Reduction Factor (ARF) takes the catchment area into account. For small catchments (below 1 km^{2}) the ARF is not required.

To find the depth of a rainfall of duration D and return period T at a given location in the UK, the following should be carried out:

1. Find M5-60 minutes rainfall depth and "r" for the location using FSR maps.
2. Divide this rainfall depth by "r" to get the M5-2 days depth.
3. Multiply the M5-2 days depth by factor Z1 to find the M5-D depth.
4. Multiply the M5-D depth by factor Z2 (the growth factor) to find the MT-D depth.
5. Multiply the MT-D depth by the Areal Reduction Factor (ARF).

=== Example ===
Find the depth of rainfall from a storm of duration 6 hours and return period 10 years on a catchment of 5 km^{2} in Sheffield.

1. From the FSR maps, the M5-60 minutes rainfall is 20.5mm, and "r" = 0.4.
2. Divide 20.5mm by 0.4 to get 51.3mm, which is the M5-2 days rainfall depth.
3. Factor Z1 = 0.64, so multiply 51.3mm by 0.64 to get 32.8mm.
4. Factor Z2 = 1.16, so multiply 32.8mm by 1.16 to get 38.1mm.
5. The ARF is 0.96, so multiply 38.1mm by 0.96 to get 36.6mm.

Therefore the expected depth of rainfall from the storm is 36.6mm. The mean intensity of rainfall is given by 36.6mm divided by 6 hours, which is 6.1mm/hour.

=== Storm profiles ===
The above method is sufficient for finding the overall depth of rainfall during a storm. However, it is often useful from an engineering perspective to predict the intensity of rainfall during the storm, to allow structures such as drains and sewers to be designed with sufficient capacity for stormwater.

In general, the intensity of a storm is highest at the mid-duration point (known as the peak), and lowest at the start and end of the storm. Therefore, peaked profiles are applied to the storm data to provide a more realistic description of the rainfall intensity during the storm.

== Flood Estimation Handbook ==
The Flood Estimation Handbook was published in 1999 and replaces the FSR. It is based on the percentage runoff equation:

$PR = 0.829PIMP + 25SOIL + 0.078UCWI - 20.7$

where PR is percentage runoff, PIMP is percentage imperviousness of the catchment, SOIL is the soil index and UCWI is urban catchment wetness index.
