= Gilson, Warwickshire =

Hamlet in Warwickshire, England

Coordinates: 52.509°N 1.723°W

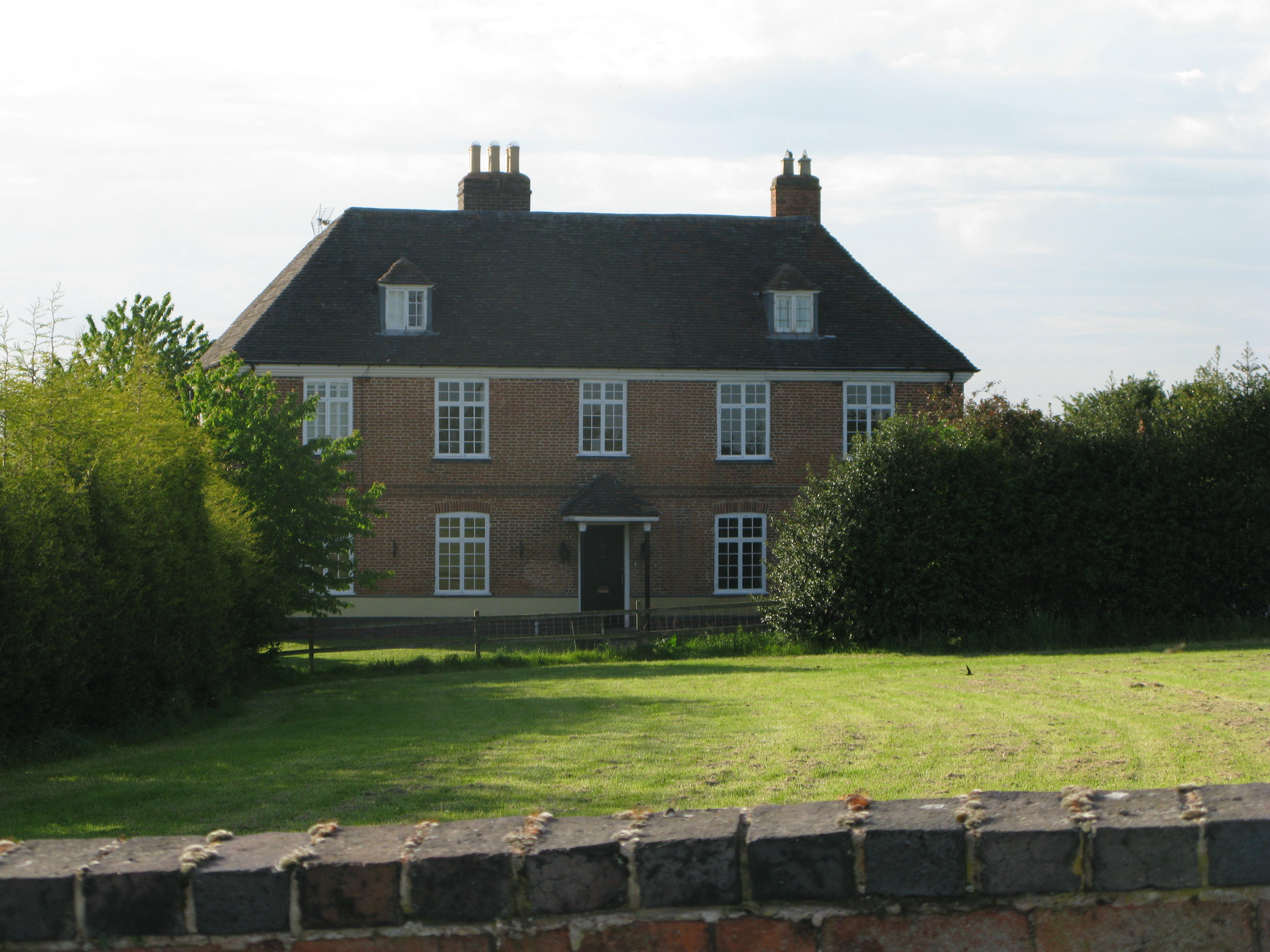
Gilson Hall

Gilson is a hamlet in the civil parish of Coleshill, in the North Warwickshire district of Warwickshire, England. It lies between the M42 and the A446, on the B4117 road between the village of Water Orton and the small market town of Coleshill.

== History ==
The first British record of the now extinct Aracites interglacialis Wieliczk was discovered in Gilson. The settlement was recorded as Gudlesdone in 1232, coming from "Gyddel's Hill," itself a derivative of the name Gydda. In the late Middle Ages, Gilson - a lordship in its own right - contained a cluster of homesteads. By 1840, a Religious Tract Society provided the residents of Gilson, and neighbouring villages and towns, with tracts. Gilson's Coleshill Hall, now Coleshill Manor, was home to the Coleshill Hall Hotel which was a psychiatric hospital established in 1929. It is a Grade II Listed Building.
