= Impervious surface =

Artificial structures such as pavements covered with water-tight materials

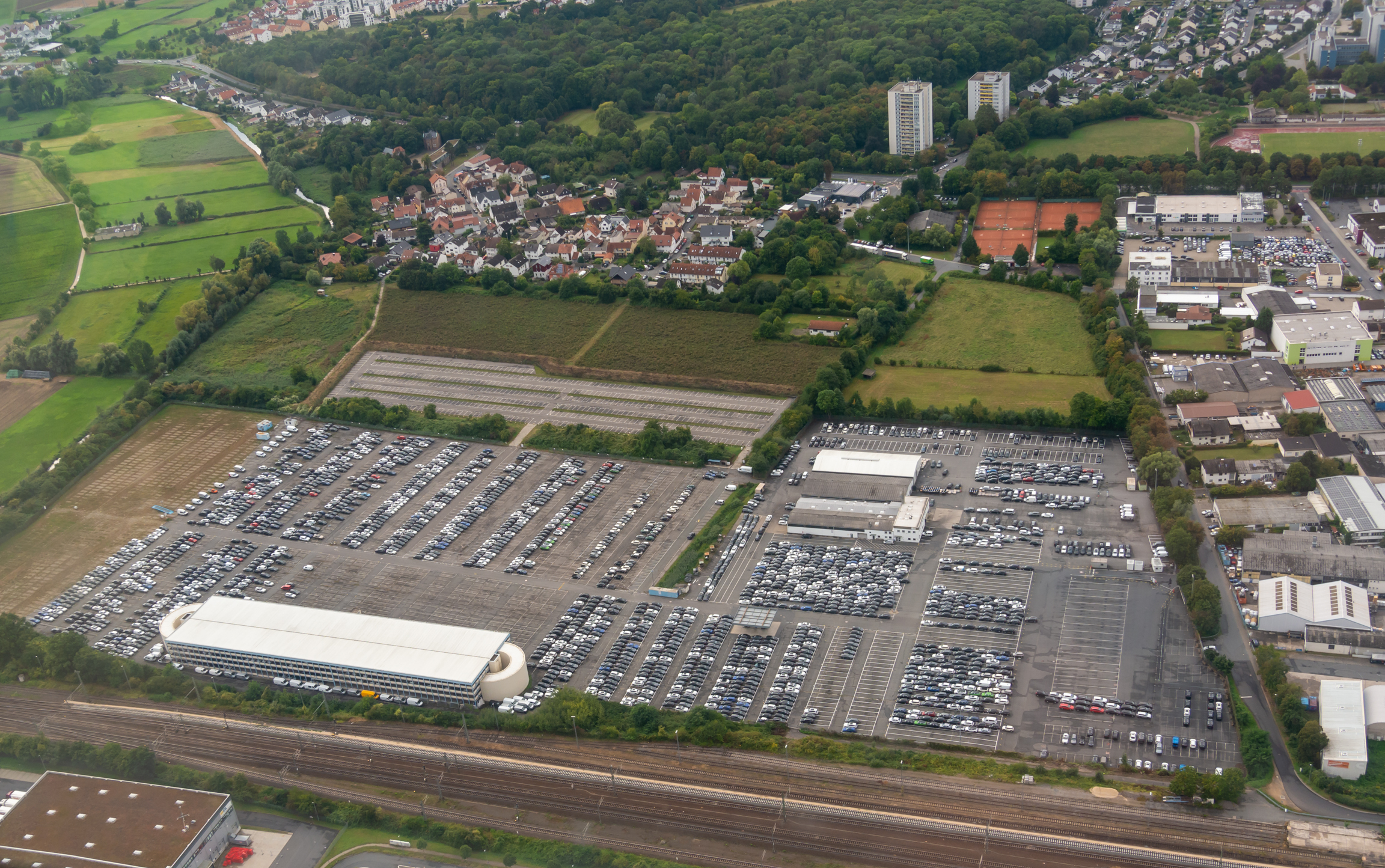
Parking lots are highly impervious.

Impervious surfaces are mainly artificial structures—such as pavements (roads, sidewalks, driveways and parking lots, as well as industrial areas such as airports, ports and logistics and distribution centres, all of which use considerable paved areas) that are covered by water-resistant materials such as asphalt, concrete, brick, stone—and rooftops. Soils compacted by urban development are also highly impervious.

== Environmental effects ==
Impervious surfaces are an environmental concern because their construction initiates a chain of events that modifies urban air and water resources:

- The pavement materials seal the soil surface, eliminating rainwater infiltration and natural groundwater recharge. This can cause urban flooding. An article in the Seattle Times states that "while urban areas cover only 3 percent of the U.S., it is estimated that their runoff is the primary source of pollution in 13 percent of rivers, 18 percent of lakes and 32 percent of estuaries."

Some of these pollutants include excess nutrients from fertilizers; pathogens; pet waste; gasoline, motor oil and heavy metals from vehicles; high sediment loads from stream bed erosion and construction sites; and waste such as cigarette butts, 6-pack holders and plastic bags carried by surges of stormwater. In some cities, the flood waters get into combined sewers, causing them to overflow, flushing their raw sewage into streams. Polluted runoff can have many negative effects on fish, animals, plants and people.

- Impervious surfaces collect solar heat in their dense mass. When the heat is released, it raises air temperatures, producing urban "heat islands", and increasing energy consumption in buildings. The warm runoff from impervious surfaces reduces dissolved oxygen in stream water, making life difficult in aquatic ecosystems.
- Impervious pavements deprive tree roots of aeration, eliminating the "urban forest" and the canopy shade that would otherwise moderate urban climate. Because impervious surfaces displace living vegetation, they reduce ecological productivity, and interrupt atmospheric carbon cycling.

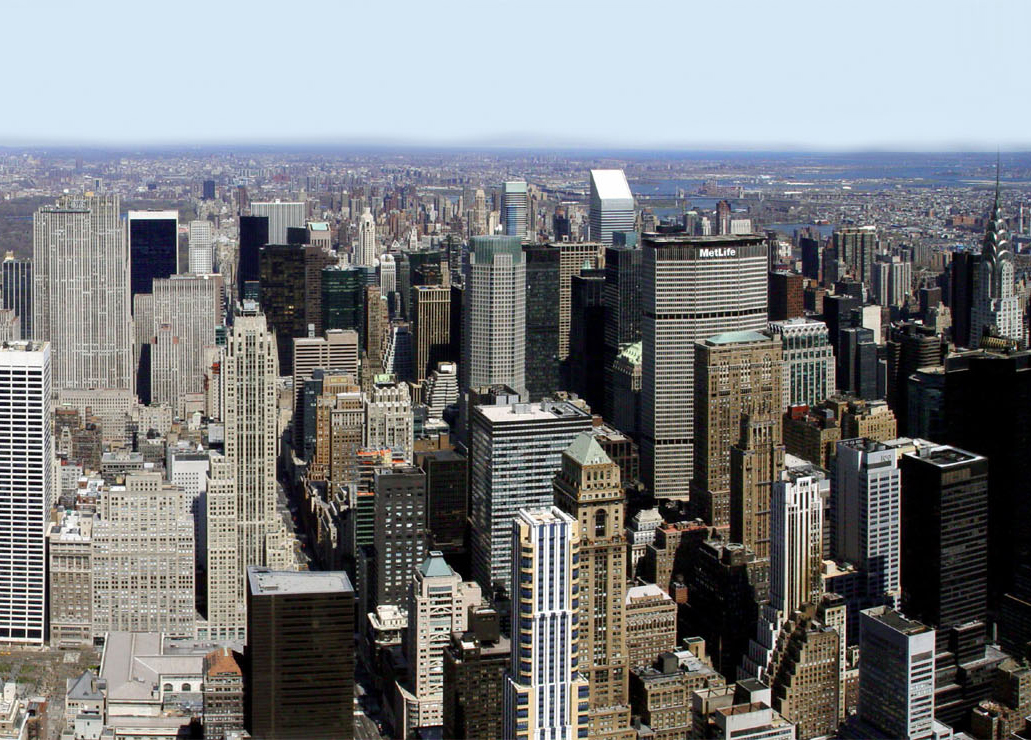
Most urban rooftops are completely impervious.

The total coverage by impervious surfaces in an area, such as a municipality or a drainage basin, is usually expressed as a percentage of the total land area. The coverage increases with rising urbanization. In rural areas, impervious cover may only be one or two percent. In residential areas, coverage increases from about 10 percent in low-density subdivisions to over 50 percent in multifamily communities. In industrial and commercial areas, coverage rises above 70 percent. In regional shopping centers and dense urban areas, it is over 90 percent. In the contiguous 48 states of the US, urban impervious cover adds up to 43,000 square miles (110,000 km^{2}). Development adds 390 square miles (1,000 km^{2}) annually. Typically, two-thirds of the cover is pavements and one-third is building roofs.

== Mitigation of environmental impacts ==
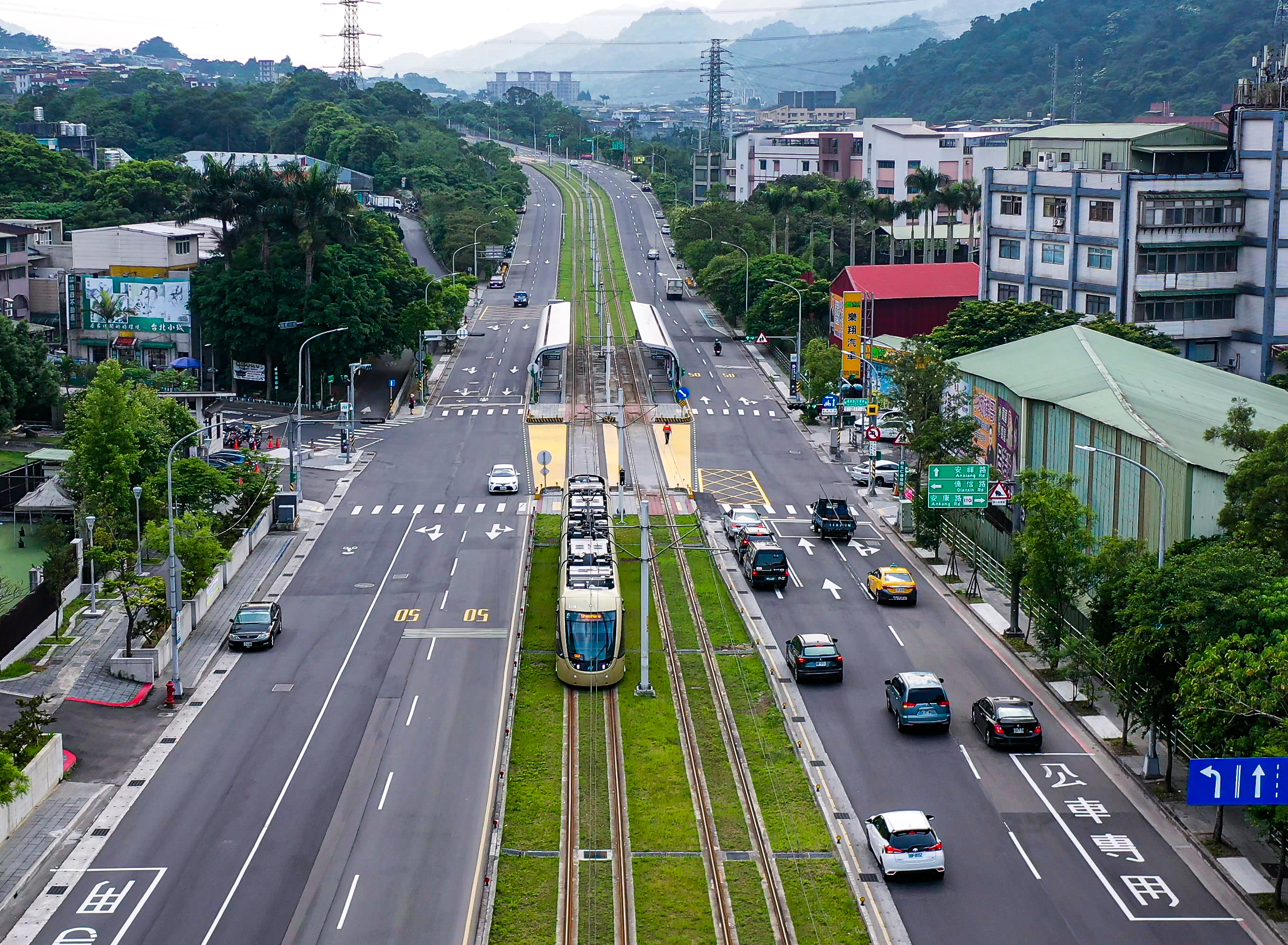
Green tramway track in Taipei, Taiwan

Impervious surface coverage can be limited by restricting land use density (such as a number of homes per acre in a subdivision), but this approach causes land elsewhere (outside the subdivision) to be developed, to accommodate the growing population. (See urban sprawl.) Alternatively, urban structures can be built differently to make them function more like naturally pervious soils; examples of such alternative structures are porous pavements, green roofs and infiltration basins.

Rainwater from impervious surfaces can be collected in rainwater tanks and used in place of main water. The island of Catalina located West of the Port of Long Beach has put extensive effort into capturing rainfall to minimize the cost of transportation from the mainland.

Partly in response to recent criticism by municipalities, a number of concrete manufacturers such as CEMEX and Quikrete have begun producing permeable materials which partly mitigate the environmental impact of conventional impervious concrete. These new materials are composed of various combinations of naturally derived solids including fine to coarse-grained rocks and minerals, organic matter (including living organisms), ice, weathered rock and precipitates, liquids (primarily water solutions), and gases. The COVID-19 pandemic gave birth to proposals for radical change in the organisation of the city, being the drastic reduction of the presence of impermeable surfaces and the recovery of the permeability of the soil one of the elements of the Manifesto for the Reorganisation of the city, published in Barcelona by architecture and urban theorist Massimo Paolini and signed by 160 academics and 350 architects.

== Percentage imperviousness ==
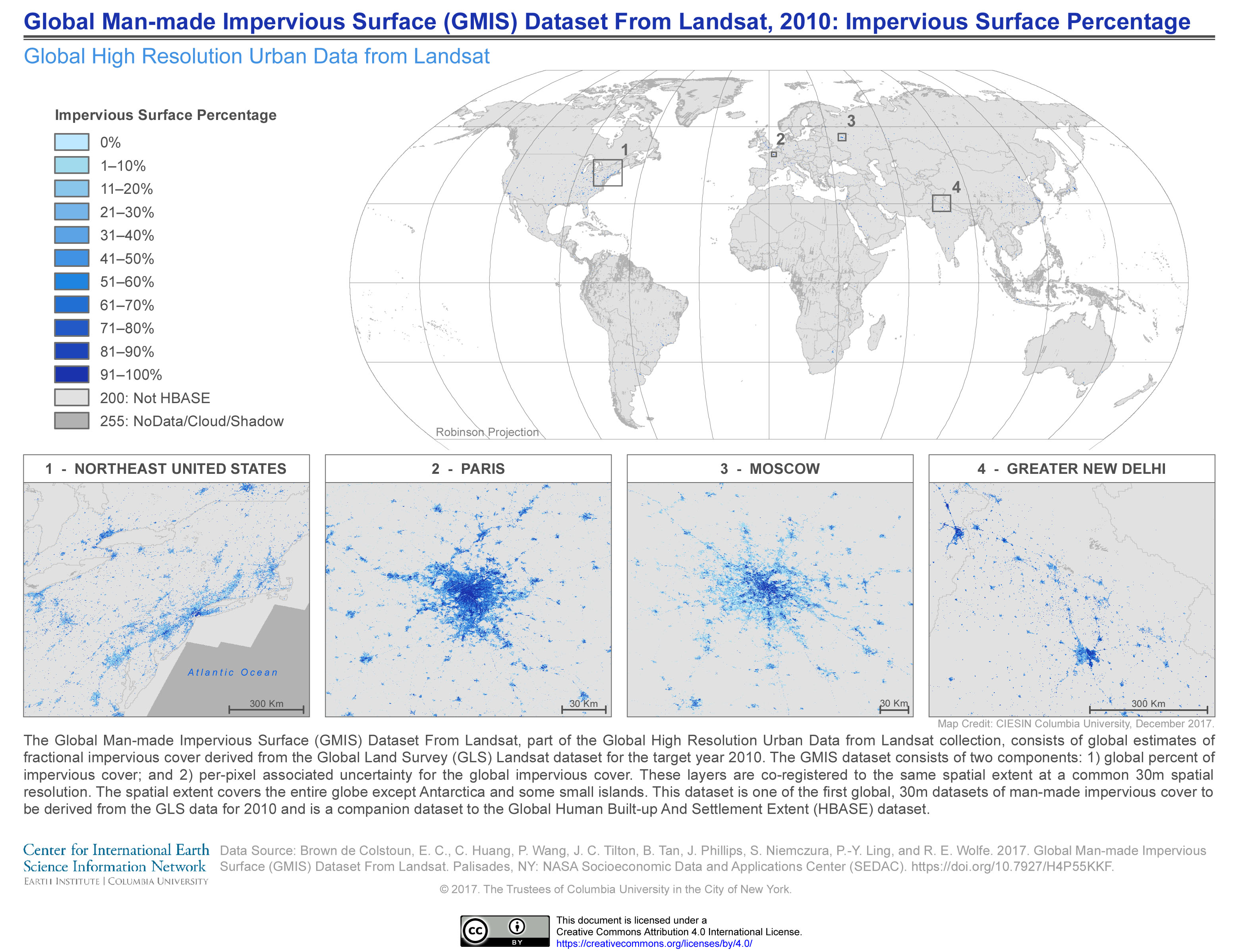
Impervious surface percentage in various cities

The percentage imperviousness, commonly referred to as PIMP in calculations, is an important factor when considering drainage of water. It is calculated by measuring the percentage of a catchment area which is made up of impervious surfaces such as roads, roofs and other paved surfaces. An estimation of PIMP is given by PIMP = 6.4J^0.5 where J is the number of dwellings per hectare (Butler and Davies 2000). For example, woodland has a PIMP value of 10%, whereas dense commercial areas have a PIMP value of 100%. This variable is used in the Flood Estimation Handbook.

Graph of impervious surface coverage in the US.

Homer and others (2007) indicate that about 76 percent of the conterminous United States is classified as having less than 1 percent impervious cover, 11 percent with impervious cover of 1 to 10 percent, 4 percent with an estimated impervious cover of 11 to 20 percent, 4.4 percent with an estimated impervious cover of 21 to 40 percent, and about 4.4 percent with an estimated impervious cover greater than 40 percent.

== Total impervious area ==
The total impervious area (TIA), commonly referred to as impervious cover (IC) in calculations, can be expressed as a fraction (from zero to one) or a percentage. There are many methods for estimating TIA, including the use of the National Land Cover Data Set (NLCD) with a Geographic information system (GIS), land-use categories with categorical TIA estimates, a generalized percent developed area, and relations between population density and TIA.

The U.S. NLCD impervious surface data set may provide a high-quality nationally consistent land cover data set in a GIS-ready format that can be used to estimate TIA value. The NLCD consistently quantifies the percent anthropogenic TIA for the NLCD at a 30-meter (a 900 m2) pixel resolution throughout the Nation. Within the data set, each pixel is quantified as having a TIA value that ranges from 0 to 100 percent. TIA estimates made with the NLCD impervious surface data set represent an aggregated TIA value for each pixel rather than a TIA value for an individual impervious feature. For example, a two lane road in a grassy field has a TIA value of 100 percent, but the pixel containing the road would have a TIA value of 26 percent. If the road (equally) straddles the boundary of two pixels, each pixel would have a TIA value of 13 percent. The Data-quality analysis of the NLCD 2001 data set with manually delimited TIA sample areas indicates that the average error of predicted versus actual TIA may range from 8.8 to 11.4 percent.

TIA estimates from land use are made by identifying land use categories for large blocks of land, summing the total area of each category, and multiplying each area by a characteristic TIA coefficient. Land use categories commonly are used to estimate TIA because areas with a common land use can be identified from field studies, from maps, from planning and zoning information, and from remote imagery. Land use coefficient methods commonly are used because planning and zoning maps that identify similar areas are, increasingly, available in GIS formats. Also, land use methods are selected to estimate potential effects of future development on TIA with planning maps that quantify projected changes in land use. There are substantial differences in actual and estimated TIA estimates from different studies in the literature. Terms like low density and high density may differ in different areas. A residential density of one-half acre per house may be classified as high density in a rural area, medium density in a suburban area, and low density in an urban area. Granato (2010) provides a table with TIA values for different land-use categories from 30 studies in the literature.

The percent developed area (PDA) is commonly used to estimate TIA manually by using maps. The Multi-Resolution Land Characteristics Consortium (MRLCC) defines a developed area as being covered by at least 30 percent of constructed materials). Southard (1986) defined non-developed areas as natural, agricultural, or scattered residential development. He developed a regression equation to predict TIA using percent developed area (table 6–1). He developed his equation using logarithmic power function with data from 23 basins in Missouri. He noted that this method was advantageous because large basins could quickly be delineated and TIA estimated manually from available maps. Granato (2010) developed a regression equation by using data from 262 stream basins in 10 metropolitan areas of the conterminous United States with drainage areas ranging from 0.35 to 216 square miles and PDA values ranging from 0.16 to 99.06 percent.

TIA also is estimated from population density data by estimating the population in an area of interest and using regression equations to calculate the associated TIA. Population-density data are used because nationally consistent census-block data are available in GIS formats for the entire United States. Population-density methods also can be used for predicting potential effects of future development. Although there may be substantial variation in relations between population density and TIA the accuracy of such estimates tend to improve with increasing drainage area as local variations are averaged out. Granato (2010) provides a table with 8 population-density relations from the literature and a new equation developed by using data from 6,255 stream basins in the USGS GAGESII dataset. Granato (2010) also provides four equations to estimate TIA from housing density, which is related to population density.

TIA is also estimated from impervious maps extracted through remote sensing. Remote sensing has been extensively utilized to detect impervious surfaces. Detection of impervious areas using deep learning in conjunction with satellite images has emerged as a transformative method in remote sensing and environmental monitoring. Deep learning algorithms, particularly convolutional neural networks (CNNs), have revolutionized our capacity to identify and quantify impervious surfaces from high-resolution satellite imagery. These models can automatically extract intricate spatial and spectral features, enabling them to discriminate between impervious and non-impervious surfaces with exceptional accuracy.

== Natural impervious area ==
Natural impervious areas are defined herein as land covers that can contribute a substantial amount of surface runoff during small and large storms, but commonly are classified as pervious areas. These areas are not commonly considered as an important source of stormflow in most highway and urban runoff-quality studies, but may produce a substantial amount of stormflow. These natural impervious areas may include open water, wetlands, rock outcrops, barren ground (natural soils with low imperviousness), and areas of compacted soils. Natural impervious areas, depending on their nature and antecedent conditions, may produce stormflow from infiltration excess overland flow, saturation overland flow, or direct precipitation. The effects of natural impervious areas on runoff generation are expected to be more important in areas with low TIA than highly developed areas.

The NLCD provides land-cover statistics that can be used as a qualitative measure of the prevalence of different land covers that may act as natural impervious areas. Open water may act as a natural impervious area if direct precipitation is routed through the channel network and arrives as stormflow at the site of interest. Wetlands may act as a natural impervious area during storms when groundwater discharge and saturation overland flow are a substantial proportion of stormflow. Barren ground in riparian areas may act as a natural impervious area during storms because these areas are a source of infiltration excess overland flows. Seemingly pervious areas that have been affected by development activities may act as impervious areas and generate infiltration excess overland flows. These stormflows may occur even during storms that do not meet precipitation volume or intensity criteria to produce runoff based on nominal infiltration rates.

Developed pervious areas may behave like impervious areas because development and subsequent use tends to compact soils and reduce infiltration rates. For example, Felton and Lull (1963) measured infiltration rates for forest soils and lawns to indicate a potential 80 percent reduction in infiltration as a result of development activities. Similarly, Taylor (1982) did infiltrometer tests in areas before and after suburban development and noted that topsoil alteration and compaction by construction activities reduced infiltration rates by more than 77 percent.

== See also ==
- Bioswale – Landscape elements designed to manage surface runoff water
- Hardscape – Hard landscape materials in the built environment structures
- Hydraulic conductivity – Ability of water to flow through a porous material
- Hydrophobic soil – Soil whose particles repel water
- Permeability (fluid) – Measure of the ability of a porous material to allow fluids to pass through it
- Soil crust – Soil surface layers that are distinct from the rest of the bulk soil
- Soil sealing – Covering of soil surfaces
- Sustainable urban drainage systems – Designed to reduce the potential impact of development
- Urban flooding – Type of flood event in cities

== Bibliography ==
- Butler, D. and Davies, J.W., 2000, Urban Drainage, London: Spon.
- Ferguson, Bruce K. (2005). Porous Pavements. Taylor & Francis. ISBN 9781420038439.
- Frazer, Lance (July 2005). "Paving paradise: the peril of impervious surfaces". Environmental Health Perspectives. 113 (7). U.S. National Institute of Environmental Health Sciences: A457–A462 – via ResearchGate.net.
- "After the Storm". Watersheds. U.S. Environmental Protection Agency. January 2003. EPA 833-B-03-002. Archived from the original on 2010-01-11.

This article incorporates public domain material from websites or documents of the United States Geological Survey and the Federal Highway Administration.
