= Patent World =

Patent World was a monthly magazine published in English and specialized in patent law and business. It was launched in 1987 and closed in 2010.

== See also ==
- List of intellectual property law journals
