= Max Planck Institute for Innovation and Competition =

German research institute

Coordinates: 48°8′25.80″N 11°34′52.32″E

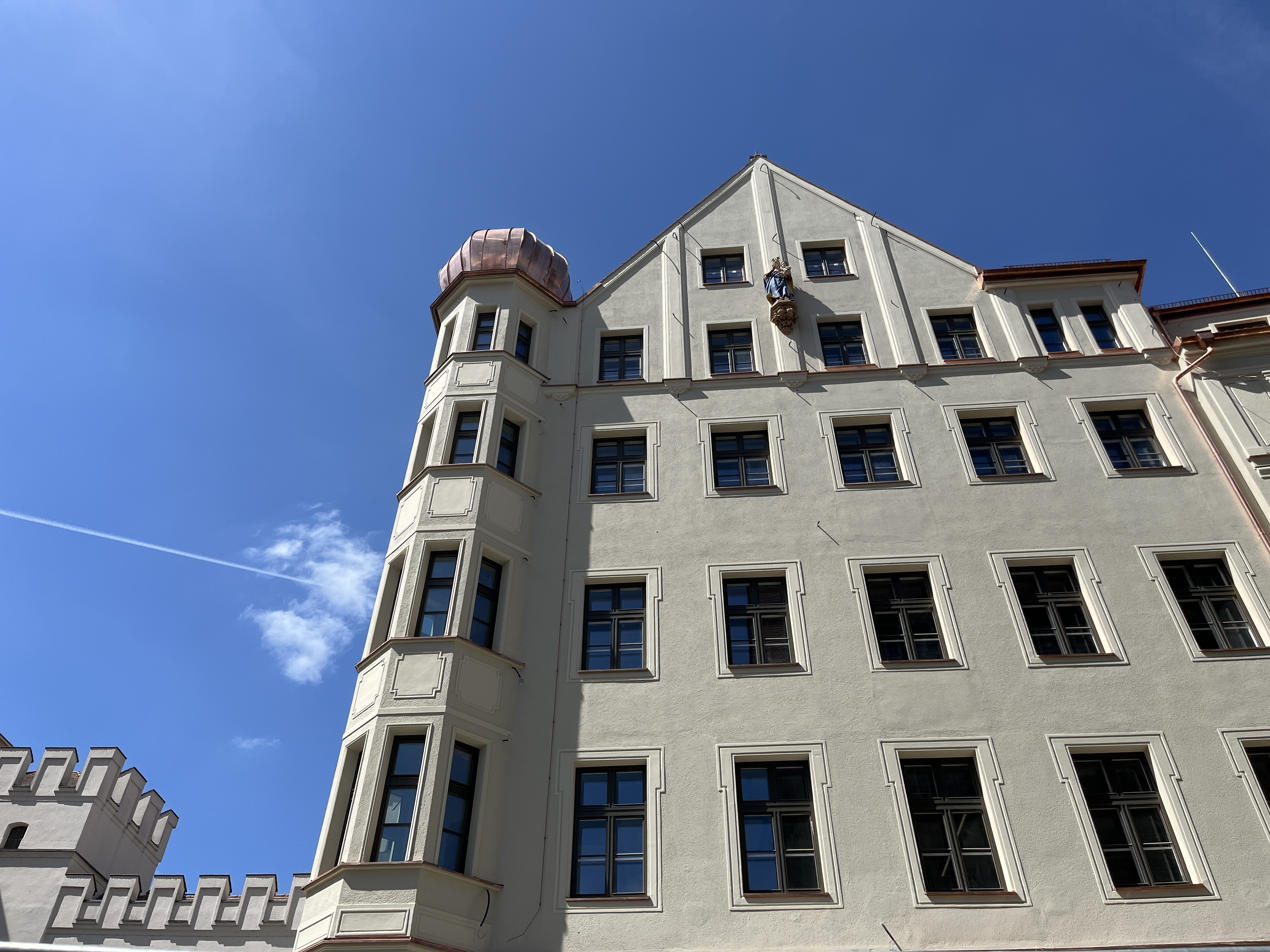

The Max Planck Institute for Innovation and Competition (German: Max-Planck-Institut für Innovation und Wettbewerb) is a Munich, Germany, based research institute, which is part of the Max Planck Society for the Advancement of Science, which manages 85 institutes and research institutions. The institute was formerly known as the Max Planck Institute for Intellectual Property and Competition Law and the name was changed to Max Planck Institute for Innovation and Competition in view of the broader focus of the institute and its interdisciplinary character.

== Research ==
The major research areas of the institute are intellectual property, innovation and competition. The institute is committed to fundamental legal and economic research on processes of innovation and competition and their regulation. Its research focuses on the incentives, determinants and implications of innovation. The institute hosts academics from all over the world and actively promotes young researchers. It informs and guides legal and economic discourse on an impartial basis. As an independent research institution, it provides evidence-based research results to academia, policymakers, the private sector as well as the general public.

The institute is editor of two scientific journals:

- GRUR International (joint with Deutsche Vereinigung für gewerblichen Rechtsschutz und Urheberrecht (GRUR e.v.)
- International Review of Intellectual Property and Competition Law (IIC).

== History ==
In 1952, a new school of law, the Institute for Foreign and International Patent, Trademark, and Copyright Law, was founded at LMU Munich. Under the leadership of its first director, Eduard Reimer (1896–1957), president of the German Patent Office, the institute quickly gained international importance and recognition. His successor, Eugen Ulmer (1903–1988), put a stamp on the research work for decades; he notably promoted the expansion of the national and international copyright and competition law. In 1966, as its founding director, he established the “Max-Planck Institute for Foreign and International Patent, Copyright and Competition Law”.

Alongside Eugen Ulmer, Friedrich-Karl Beier (1926–1997) and Gerhard Schricker (until 2003) were admitted to the directorate of the Max Planck Institute. In the following decades, the Max Planck Institute would exert a wide-ranging influence on the national and international development of the relevant fields of law. An outstanding example of this influence was research based on comparative law analyses regarding European harmonisation of the law against unfair competition of trademark law, of design law as well as copyright law. Comparative law studies on the patentability of biotechnological inventions or the exploration of limits between the trademark rights were also essential.

In 2002, the institute was modernised significantly, in particular with respect to personnel, areas of expertise, and its facilities. On 1 January 2002, Josef Drexl, Reto M. Hilty and Wolfgang Schön were appointed to the directorate of the Max Planck Institute, serving alongside Joseph Straus, who was appointed director in 2001, taking over the directorship from Gerhard Schricker. On 1 July 2002, a new department, “Accounting and Taxes”, was added to the newly formed unit “Intellectual Property Law and Competition Law”. This department was conceived to cover law regarding capital market information and the taxation of companies as constituents of the international economic and competition regime.

Also in 2002, the Munich Intellectual Property Law Center (MIPLC) was founded, which from an administrative point of view is managed as an independent department of the institute, but is supported by the Max Planck Society in cooperation with the University of Augsburg, the Technical University of Munich as well as the George Washington Law School, Washington D.C. The MIPLC conducts both research and teaching and, since autumn 2003, offers an internationally networked LLM degree, under the direction of Joseph Straus (until 2008) and Josef Drexl (as of 2009) and staffed by world-renowned academics. The emphasis is on IP law and courses are held in English. Students come from many countries of all five continents.

In 2009, Kai A. Konrad was appointed to the directorate of the institute, and the Department of Public Economics was added to the formed unit "Intellectual Property, Competition and Tax Law". The main field of public economics studies the functioning of government, as well as the challenges and the opportunities for reform. The department analyzes the limits and scope of government, with a special focus on levying taxes to finance its core tasks in a modern nation state.

In January 2011 the Max Planck Institute for Intellectual Property, Competition and Tax Law (German: Max-Planck-Institut für Geistiges Eigentum, Wettbewerbs- und Steuerrecht) was split to form the Max Planck Institute for Intellectual Property and Competition Law under the directorship of Josef Drexl and Reto M. Hilty, and the MPI for Tax Law and Public Finance under the directorship of Kai A. Konrad and Wolfgang Schön. At the same time these Institutes, along with the MPI for Foreign and International Social Law, joined to form the Munich Max Planck Campus for Legal and Economic Research.

In 2013 the institute was extended by an economic science department headed by Prof. Dietmar Harhoff and renamed to Max Planck Institute for Innovation and Competition.

In May 2025 the institute was relocated to new premises at Herzog-Max-Str. 4, next to Karlsplatz/Stachus.

== Max Planck Law ==
The institute is part of the research network Max Planck Law.

== See also ==
- Intellectual property organization
