= World Trademark Review =

Intellectual property law magazine

World Trademark Review is a website and magazine covering the commercial and international practice of trademark law. Subscribers receive a print magazine once every other month and a daily email newsletter featuring news stories, feature articles and legal updates from a panel of trademark experts.

The website and magazine are published by Law Business Research, a specialist legal publisher based in London, UK.

World Trademark Review also runs the WTR Industry Awards programme. The awards recognize the best trademark teams and individuals. Past winners include employees of Google, The Coca-Cola Company, Microsoft, Diageo, Gucci and Intel.

World Trademark Review was originally one of the publications produced by The IP Media Group, which was formed in 2008. The group also publishes Intellectual Asset Management magazine, organizes the IP Business Congress and runs the IP Hall of Fame.

== See also ==
- List of intellectual property law journals
