= Managing Intellectual Property =

British media group

Managing IP
- Managing editor: Ed Conlon
- Former editors: Michael Loney; James Nurton
- Categories: Law
- Founder: Jeremy Phillips
- Founded: 1990
- Company: Delinian
- Country: UK
- Based in: London
- Language: English
- Website: managingip.com

Managing Intellectual Property (also known as Managing IP or MIP) is a British media group which specializes in providing news and analysis on the intellectual property world. Initially launched as a monthly magazine reporting patent and trademark-related news in 1990, Managing IP has since grown to encompass data analysis, podcasts, conference reporting, rankings and research projects, as well as the longest-running awards programme for law firms in the IP world.

== History ==
The site was launched as a monthly magazine by Jeremy Phillips in 1990, before being sold to the financial news group, Euromoney Institutional Investor in 1991. As a part of the group's Legal Media Group division, the title largely appeals to the legal profession working within intellectual property.

=== Ownership ===
As part of the Legal Media Group (LMG), Managing IP was published by Euromoney Institutional Investor, one of the biggest finance and business publishing companies in Europe. It was listed on the London Stock Exchange and was a constituent of the FTSE 250 Index until it was acquired by private equity groups, Astorg and Epiris, in November 2022 and renamed as Delinian.

=== Awards and research ===
Managing IP launched its legal directory publication (The World IP Contacts Handbook) in 1994. The legal directory was rebranded in 2013 as IP STARS, an annual guide that ranks the leading IP law firms and practitioners across the world. The guide is based on an annual research conducted by Managing IP's research analysts in Chennai, Hong Kong, London, New York and Sofia. On an annual basis, the group recognises lawyers as "IP Stars" across trademarks, patents, copyright, design and IP transactions. The group also produces lists highlighting the top 250 women in IP, "Rising Stars" for emerging lawyers, and corporate IP stars.

Managing IP's inaugural awards ceremony in London during 2006 was attended by more than 130 guests including Sir Hugh Laddie, who was the first winner of the lifetime achievement award. The awards programme subsequently grew to have three different ceremonies across Hong Kong, London and New York to recognise achievements in intellectual property across different regions. The London ceremony in 2022, the 17th annual awards, had more than 500 guests in attendance.

== See also ==
- List of intellectual property law journals
- Intellectual property analytics
