= Intellectual Asset Management =

Business magazine

Intellectual Asset Management (IAM) is a bimonthly magazine published in English and focused on "intellectual property from a business point of view". Its publisher is Globe White Page Ltd, and, as of 2010, its editorial board included former Corporate VP for IP at Microsoft, Marshall Phelps. Its tagline is "Maximising IP value for business". Its first issue was published in 2003 (July/August 2003 issue).

IAM is one of the publications produced by The IP Media Group, which was formed in 2008. The group also publishes World Trademark Review, a magazine for trademark specialists, organizes the IP Business Congress and runs the IP Hall of Fame.

== See also ==
- List of intellectual property law journals
