= GRUR International =

Academic journal

- Discipline: Intellectual property law
- Language: English

Publication details
- Former names: Gewerblicher Rechtsschutz und Urheberrecht, Internationaler Teil
- Publisher: Verlag C.H. Beck and Oxford University Press
- Frequency: monthly

Standard abbreviations
- ISO 4: GRUR Int.

Indexing
- ISSN: 2632-8623 (print); 2632-8550 (web)

GRUR International - Journal of European and International IP Law (formerly Gewerblicher Rechtsschutz und Urheberrecht, Internationaler Teil) is a monthly journal co-published in English by Verlag C.H. Beck and Oxford University Press. Founded in 1952 and owned by the German Association for the Protection of Intellectual Property (GRUR), since 1967 the Max Planck Institute for Innovation and Competition has assumed the scientific direction of the journal. Originally published in the German language, GRUR International made the transition to English in 2020.

The journal covers worldwide developments in intellectual property and competition law. In addition to scientific articles, the journal also publishes decisions and leading cases from jurisdictions around the world, as well as editorials, opinions, reports, case notes, official statements and book reviews. The editors-in-chief are Reto M. Hilty and Josef Drexl (Max Planck Institute for Innovation and Competition). The total annual volume amounts to approximately 1,200 printed pages.

== See also ==
- List of intellectual property law journals
- Gewerblicher Rechtsschutz und Urheberrecht (GRUR)
- Gewerblicher Rechtsschutz und Urheberrecht, Rechtsprechungs-Report (GRUR RR)
