= Gewerblicher Rechtsschutz und Urheberrecht =

German monthly intellectual property law journal

- Discipline: Intellectual property law
- Language: German

Publication details
- History: 1899–present
- Frequency: Monthly

Standard abbreviations
- ISO 4: Gewerbl. Rechtsschutz Urheberr.

Indexing
- ISSN: 0016-9420
- OCLC no.: 7375860

Links
- Journal homepage

Gewerblicher Rechtsschutz und Urheberrecht is a monthly intellectual property law journal published in German. It is the journal of the German Association for the Protection of Intellectual Property (German: Deutsche Vereinigung für gewerblichen Rechtsschutz und Urheberrecht) and was established in 1899. The journal articles mainly concern German law. It is the journal with the longest tradition in the field of intellectual property law in Germany. Because of the green cover of the journal, the whole area of intellectual property law is commonly referred to as "green section" ("grüner Bereich") among German lawyers.

== See also ==
- List of intellectual property law journals
- GRUR International
- Gewerblicher Rechtsschutz und Urheberrecht, Rechtsprechungs-Report
