= Gewerblicher Rechtsschutz und Urheberrecht, Rechtsprechungs-Report =

Gewerblicher Rechtsschutz und Urheberrecht Rechtsprechungs-Report (GRUR-RR) is a monthly intellectual property law journal published in German. It comprises case law decisions "supplementing the court rulings section" of the main Gewerblicher Rechtsschutz und Urheberrecht (GRUR) journal. The first issue was published in 2001.

== See also ==
- List of intellectual property law journals
- GRUR International
