= Munich Intellectual Property Law Center =

German research and education institute

The Munich Intellectual Property Law Center (MIPLC) is a center for both research and education in intellectual property and competition law, founded in 2003 and based in Munich, Germany. The MIPLC is a project of the George Washington University Law School and three German institutions: the Max Planck Institute for Innovation and Competition, the University of Augsburg, and the Technical University of Munich (TUM). It offers the English-language LL.M. program "Intellectual Property and Competition Law."

The MIPLC furthermore organizes scientific conferences.

== See also ==
- Intellectual property organization
