= Sugimura =

Sugimura (written: 杉村 lit. "japanese cedar village") is a Japanese surname. Notable people with the surname include:

- Haruko Sugimura, Japanese actress
- Sugimura Jihei (1681–1703), Japanese printmaker
- Kenji Sugimura, Japanese architect and patent attorney
- Mizuki Sugimura (born 2003), Japanese judoka
- Noboru Sugimura, Japanese writer
- Nobuchika Sugimura, Japanese patent attorney
- Shojiro Sugimura, Japanese footballer
- Shunzo Sugimura, Japanese medical researcher and writer
- Taizō Sugimura
- Tsune Sugimura, Japanese photographer
- Yoko Sugimura, Japanese pin-up model

== See also ==
- Sugimura & Partners, a Japanese law firm
