= Japanese patent law =

Aspect of Japanese law

Japanese patent law is based on the first-to-file principle and is mainly given force by the Patent Act (特許法, Tokkyohō) of Japan. Article 2 defines an invention as "the highly advanced creation of technical ideas utilizing the law of nature".

== English translation ==
The definitive version of Japanese law is the text in the Japanese language. An official English-language translation of the law does not exist, but the Ministry of Justice Japan has the website "Japanese Law Translation", where one can search for Japanese laws and their unofficial English translation. Intellectual property (IP) laws such as Patent Act, Copyright Act, Trademark Act, Design Act and Unfair Competition Prevention Act are included there.

In addition, the Industrial Property Digital Library (IPDL) offers public access to IP Gazettes of the Japan Patent Office (JPO) free of charge through the Internet.

Reliable information on Japanese IP law in English is also provided by the websites of Intellectual Property High Court, Japan Patent Office, "Transparency of Japanese Law Project", European Patent Office, and Institute of Intellectual Property (IIP) of Japan. For more details, see "External links" at the bottom of this page.

== Definition of invention ==
Article 2, paragraph 1, of the Patent Act of Japan defines invention as "the highly advanced creation of technical ideas by which a law of nature is utilized". This definition was introduced in 1959 following German jurist Josef Kohler's definition. Although the substance of the definition is almost accepted, there is opposition against giving a definition of "invention" in a written law (in many other patent systems, invention is not defined directly).

In the generally accepted interpretation, the phrase highly advanced does not imply a requirement for an inventive step since the matter of inventive step is dealt with in Article 29, paragraph 2. The definition may have been included in light of the Utility Model Act of Japan which gives a definition of a device as "the creation of technical ideas by which a law of nature is utilized".

== Patent prosecution ==
The procedures for obtaining a patent right in Japan are described in detail on the website of Japan Patent Office. The patent prosecution procedure under Japanese law is similar to that in most other patent systems. Article 39 states that a person who is the first to file an application for a patent for an invention may obtain that patent, rather than a different person who is the first to invent the same invention.

A patent may be granted for an invention if:

- the invention as claimed is industrially applicable (Article 29, paragraph 1),
- the claims are novel (Article 29, paragraph 1),
- the claims are inventive (Article 29, paragraph 2),
- the patent does not harm public order, morality or public health (Article 32),
- amendments to the specification, claims or drawings remain within the scope of the matters disclosed in the original version (Article 17bis),
- the specification discloses the invention in a manner sufficiently clear and complete for a person skilled in the art to carry it out (Article 36, paragraph 4),
- the statement of the claims is clear (Article 36, paragraph 6),
- the application meets the requirement for unity of invention (Article 37),
- the applicant is the first to file an application for a patent for the invention (Articles 29bis and 39), and
- the applicant has the right to obtain a patent for the invention (Article 25 and 38, and Article 49, paragraph 7).

(This is a summary; Article 49 contains a full list of conditions.)

Article 30 provides a six-month grace period for disclosures made through an experiment, publication, presentation at a study meeting or an exhibition (a trade fair or the World's Fair) or for if the invention becomes known to public against the applicant's will. Such disclosures do not form part of the prior art. This is a much broader exemption than the one available under European patent law (Article 55 EPC) but is significantly narrower than that provided under United States patent law.

=== Application ===
A person desiring to obtain a patent has to submit a request, specification, claims, any drawings necessary, and the abstract to the commissioner of the Japan Patent Office (Article 36). Article 36bis allows an application in foreign languages (currently only in English) if the applicant submits a Japanese translation within two months from the filing date. However, the applicant may not amend the foreign language file (Article 17, paragraph 2). In 2007 there was a revision of Japan Patent Law. Pursuant to a 2007 revision of the law, the period for filing a Japanese translation for a Foreign Language Application is 14 months from the filing date or the priority date.

=== Publication of application ===
Patent applications are published without a search report after 18 months has expired from the filing date (Article 64). The applicant may request for early publication (Article 64bis).

=== Examination ===
Request for examination and payment of examination fee are needed for an application to be examined (Article 48bis). The applicant, or a third party, may request examination within three years from the filing date (Article 48ter), (this time limit is to be applied for patent applications filed after October 1, 2001) if they stand examination fee (Article 195, paragraph 2).

A qualified examiner examines the application (Article 47). The examiner notifies the applicant of the reasons for refusal before making the decision to refuse a patent (Article 50), pointing out that some of the above conditions for patent are not met. The applicant may submit a statement or amendments against the reasons for refusal, within a time limit designated by the examiner (Article 17bis and 50). The time limit is normally 60 days after the date of notification for applicants living in Japan, or three months after the date of notification for applicants living in foreign countries.

If the examiner finds that some reasons for refusal notified to the applicant have not dissolved by the applicant's statement or amendment, the examiner issues a decision to refuse a patent (Article 49); otherwise the examiner issues the decision to grant a patent (Article 51).

Opposition procedure after an examiner's decision to grant a patent was abandoned in 2003; trial for invalidation (Article 123) serves as the alternative.

Whenever the applicant is allowed to amend the claims, specification, and drawings of a certain application, the applicant may derive a new application from the application (Article 44). This is called "division of application". Division of application is not allowed after the applicant received a copy of the examiner's decision to grant a patent.

The Japan Patent Office's interpretation of the patent law related to examination procedure is provided for in the "Examination Guidelines for Patent and Utility Model in Japan" in English."

=== Trial against examiner's decision of refusal ===
Applicants dissatisfied at the decision of refusal may demand a trial within 3 months from receiving a copy of the decision (Article 121). Amendments are allowed when they demand for the trial (Article 17bis, paragraph 1).

If amendments are made, an examiner re-examines the application (Article 162). Usually the examiner who made the decision of refusal is appointed for re-examination. The examiner then issues a decision to grant a patent, or reports to the Commissioner if there are reasons for refusal that have not dissolved by the amendments (Article 164).

In case amendments were not made, or the examiner reported that reasons for refusal still remain, a group of three or five qualified trial examiners (Article 136) conduct the trial by communicating with the applicant in letters (Article 145, paragraph 2).

A person dissatisfied at the trial may demand a retrial (Article 171), or may sue the commissioner of the Japan Patent Office in quest of the patent (Article 178 and 179).

== Trial for invalidation ==
Anyone may demand the commissioner of the patent office a trial for invalidation of a patent against the patentee (Article 123). A group of three or five trial examiners (Article 136) conduct the trial, gathering the parties to the patent office (Article 145, paragraph 1 and 3). The patentee may demand restriction of claims, or correction of errors or ambiguity (Article 134bis, added in 2003) to avoid the invalidation.

A lawsuit against patent infringement may be suspended until a trial decision of the patent office has become final and conclusive (Article 168, paragraph 2).

== Patentability ==
Summary of the rules on patentability is as follows. More detailed description is found in "Examination Guidelines for Patent and Utility Model in Japan" with summaries of significant court decisions.

=== Novelty ===
Sharing the same rule as other jurisdictions, Japanese patent law does not grant exclusionary rights to existing technologies. Article 29(1) of Patent Act stipulates this point; an inventor may not obtain a patent for inventions that were known to the public ("publicly known") (Item (i)), inventions that were publicly worked ("publicly used") (Item (ii)) or inventions that were described in a distributed publication or made publicly available through an electric telecommunication line (Item (iii)), in Japan or a foreign country prior to the filing of the patent application.

=== Inventive step ===
Where at the time of the application a person ordinarily skilled in the field of art to which the invention belongs (a “person skilled in the art”) would have been able to easily make the invention based on a technology falling under any of the items under Article 29(1) of the Patent Act (that is, an invention involving prior art or that is publicly known), the invention cannot be patented (Patent Act Article 29(2)). For this decision to be made, in the abstract, an accurate assessment is firstly to be made of the standard of art in the field of art to which the invention belongs as at the time of the application, and the points where the application invention varies from the prior art are to be made clear. Then, while making allowance for the purpose and effect of the invention, a decision is to be made depending on whether or not it is possible to logically support a person skilled in the art having been easily able to achieve the application invention by altering the prior art.

=== Industrial applicability ===
In order to be granted a patent, it must first be industrially applicable: proviso to Patent Act Article 29(1). In particular, with respect to inventions such as those concerning genes, chemical substances or organisms, a concrete applicable use must be specified.

“Industry” is a broad concept that includes manufacturing industries, agricultural, fishing and forestry industries, mining industries, commercial industries, and service industries. Medical industries are excluded from “industries”, however, and grants of patents for inventions of acts of medical treatment are not recognized, on the ground that they are not industrially applicable. This exclusion stems from the ethical consideration that diagnoses and treatments available to medical practitioners in their treatment of patients must not be limited in any way by the presence of any kind of patent rights, and it is a legal construction adopted due to the lack of any statutory provision expressly denying the validity of patent rights vis-à-vis acts of medical treatment. However, patent rights can be obtained over aspects of medical treatment including pharmaceuticals and medical devices, and the methods of their manufacture (note that Article 69(3) of the Patent Act however stipulates certain limitations on the effect of patent rights obtained for pharmaceuticals).

== Effects of patent rights ==
After payment of the annual fees for the first three years, a patent right comes into force by registration (Article 66). The commissioner issues the certificate of patent to the patentee (Article 28). The term of patent is 20 years from the filing date. It may be extended for medicines and pesticides (Article 67).

A patentee have an exclusive right to commercially work the patented invention (Article 68), where "work" an invention means (Article 2, paragraph 3)

- make, use, assign, lease, import, or offer for assignment or lease a patented product,
- use a patented process, or
- use, assign, lease, import, or offer for assignment or lease the product made by a patented process.

The statements of patent claims determine the technical scope of the patented invention (Article 70). However, the doctrine of equivalents may be employed.

A patentee may grant an exclusive license (Article 77) or a non-exclusive license (Article 78).

== Infringement and remedies ==
=== Civil remedies ===
==== Right to demand an injunction ====
The patentee may exercise a right to demand an injunction against the person who infringes or is likely to infringe its rights: Article 100(1) of the Patent Act. A “person who infringes or is likely to infringe the patent rights” in that paragraph means a person who works (Article 2(3)) a patented invention without the patentee's permission, or a person who commits an act of indirect infringement.

In making a demand for an injunction under Paragraph (1) of Article 100, the patentee may also demand measures necessary for the prevention of an act of infringement, including the disposal of products constituting the act of infringement and the removal of facilities used for the act of infringement: Article 100(2).

==== Damages ====
Since a patent right is also a kind of property right, an act of infringement of a patent right constitutes a tort, and a patentee who sustains damages as a result of an act of infringement may demand damages from the infringer in tort (Article 709 of the Civil Code). Unlike an ordinary tortious act however, in the case of the infringement of a patent right, it is often difficult to prove the amount of the loss, as well as intent or negligence on the part of the infringer. For that reason, the Patent Act contains a special provision for calculating the amount of loss (Article 102), a provision on the presumption of negligence (Article 103), and a provision permitting the determination of a reasonable amount of loss (Article 105-3).

=== Case law in infringement litigation ===
==== Doctrine of equivalents ====
In 1998, the Supreme Court of Japan showed in judgment the requirements for applying the doctrine of equivalents. The judgment says:

even if, within the construction as indicated in the claim in the patent specification, there is a part which is different from the products, if (a) this part is not the essential part of the patented invention, (b) the purpose of the patented invention can be achieved by replacing this part with a part in the products and an identical function and effect can be obtained, (c) a person who has an average knowledge in the area of technology where this invention belongs could easily come up with the idea of such replacement at the time of the production of the products, (d) the products are not identical to the technology in the public domain at the time of the patent application of the patented invention or could have been easily conceived at that time by a person who has an average knowledge in the area of technology where this invention belongs, and (e) there were no special circumstances such as the fact that the products had been intentionally excluded from the scope of the patent claim in the patent application process, the products should be regarded as identical with the construction as indicated in the scope of the patent claim and fall within the scope of the technical scope of the patented invention.

==== Exercise of patent that would be invalid ====
In 2000, the Supreme Court of Japan said in judgment:

a court considering a claim of patent infringement should be capable of judging whether or not there exists sufficient reasons to invalidate the patent, even prior to the Japan Patent Office's issuance of a final decision invalidating the patent. If during the hearings the court finds that there exists sufficient cause to invalidate the patent, a claim of injunction, damages, or other claims based on such patent would be an extension of rights beyond the scope contemplated under the law unless it can be demonstrated that circumstances exist which justify special treatment.

and clarified that a court may judge the invalidity of patent in a patent infringement lawsuit.

Summary of the judgment:

In the event there is clear and convincing evidence that a patent is invalid, a claim for injunction, damages, or other claims based on such patent is beyond the scope of rights intended by the act, except in extenuating circumstances.

=== Criminal penalty ===
Japanese patent law provides that patent infringement is a crime. A person who has infringed a patent right must be engaged in penal servitude for at most ten years, and/or must pay a fine of at most ten million yen (Article 196). In addition to the above penalty for an infringer, a firm that the infringer belongs to must pay a fine of at most 300 million yen (Article 201).

According to statistics of the National Police Agency of Japan, however, only four people were arrested for the infringement of patent in 2003.

== History ==
The history of Japanese patent law began with the opening of the country that began in the Meiji era. Fukuzawa Yukichi introduced the concept of the patent to Japan in his 1867 writings. The next year, the Meiji Restoration occurred, and the modernization of Japan began.

In 1871—the fourth year of the Meiji era, an experimental patent system was implemented. It was abandoned the following year.

The first substantial patent law in Japan was established by the "Patent Monopoly Act" (專賣特許條例 Senbai tokkyo jōrei) on April 18, 1885. (In 1954, the Ministry of International Trade and Industry of Japan declared April 18 to be Invention Day.)

The first seven patents under the Patent Monopoly Act were granted on August 14, 1885. Hotta Zuisho obtained Japanese Patent No. 1 for an anticorrosive paint. Takabayashi Kenzo obtained Patent No. 2–4 for tea processing machines.

During the Meiji era, all governmental systems underwent frequent changes, and the patent law was no exception. The Patent Monopoly Act was replaced by the Patent Act (特許條例 Tokkyo jōrei) in 1888; the Patent Act was replaced by the Patent Law (特許法 Tokkyohō) of 1899, which was completely revised in 1909. After the Meiji era, the Patent Act was completely revised twice, in 1921 and 1959.

The 1959 Japanese patent law was amended several times, especially pertaining to opposition proceedings, the term of patent, and compliance with the Patent Cooperation Treaty (PCT) in relation to criteria of novelty.

== See also ==
- Japan Patent Attorneys Association (JPAA)
- F-term
- Japanese copyright law
- Japanese trademark law
- Japanese design law
- Japanese law
- Judicial system of Japan
- Japan Intellectual Property Association
- Benrishi - patent attorney
