= 1992 in architecture =

The year 1992 in architecture involved some significant architectural events and new buildings.

== Events ==
- At least 7 stave churches in Norway suffer arson attacks, for some of which early black metal musician Varg Vikernes is convicted.
- December 6 – Demolition of the Babri Masjid in India.

== Buildings and structures ==
=== Buildings ===
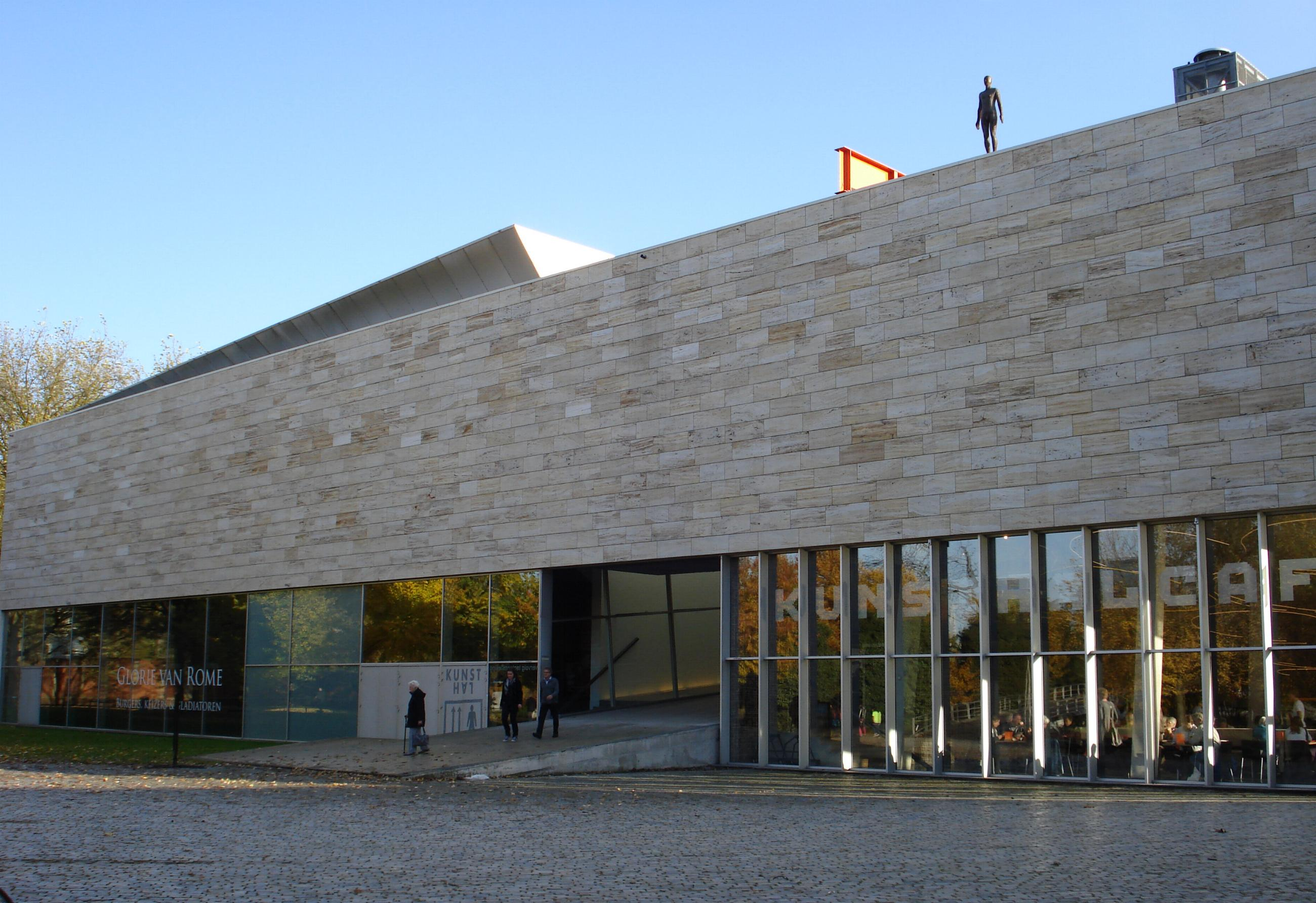
Kunsthal in Rotterdam, Holland

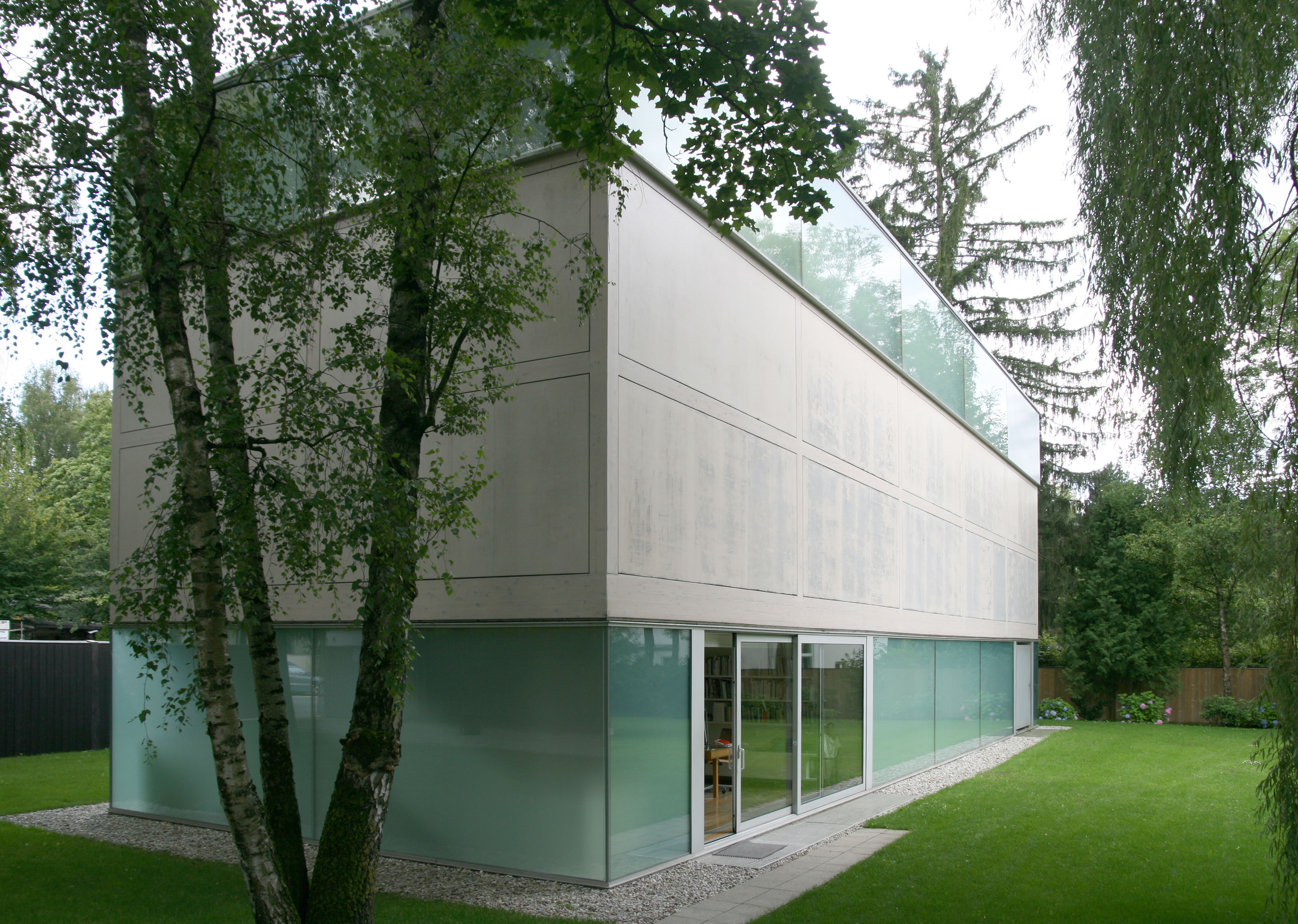
Goetz Collection

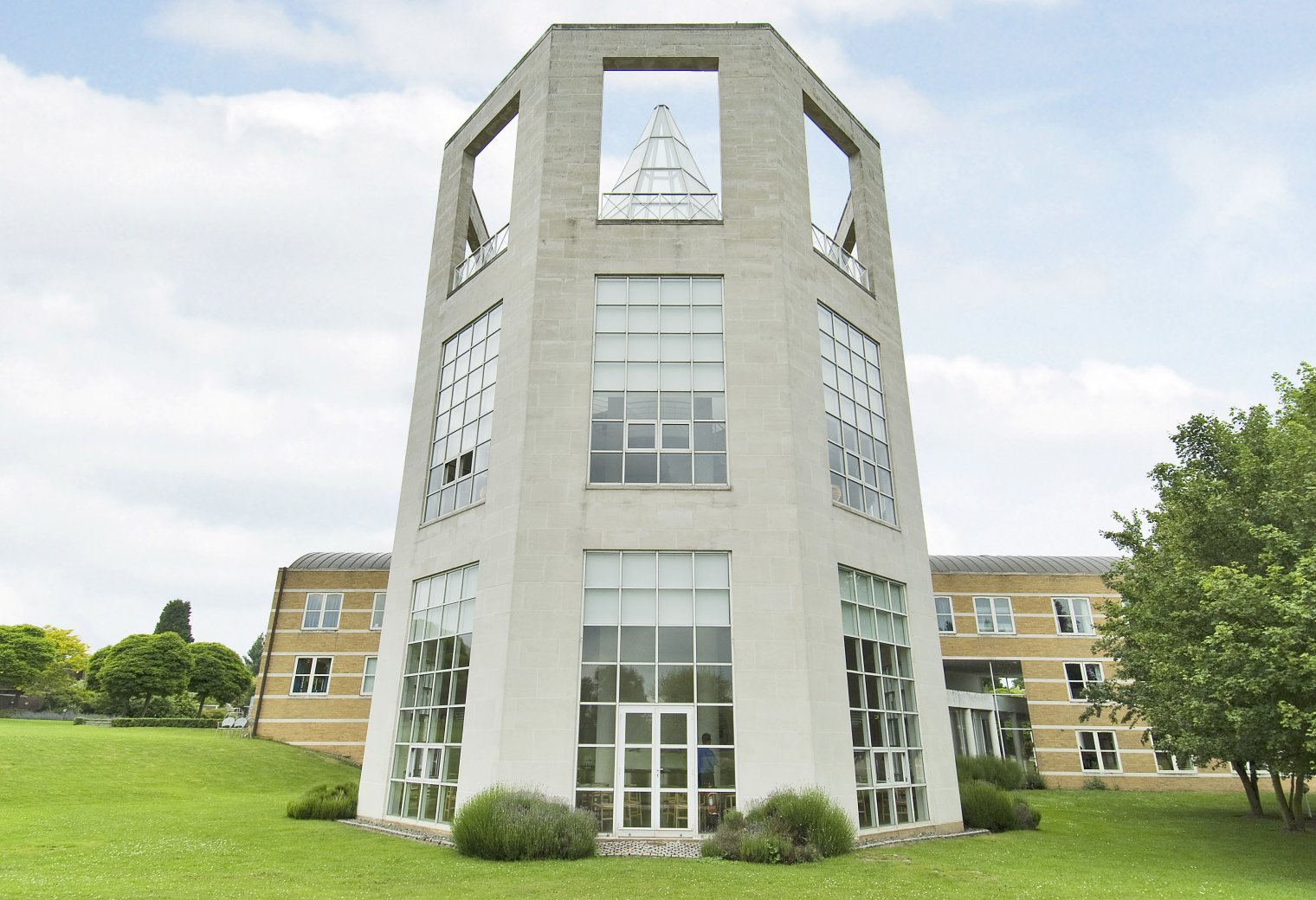
Møller Centre at Churchill College, Cambridge, England

- October 22: YKK Manufacturing and Engineering Centre in Namerikawa, Toyama, Japan, designed by Roy Fleetwood and Kenji Sugimura, is opened.
- October 31: Kunsthal in Rotterdam, designed by Rem Koolhaas is opened.
- specific date not listed:
  - Great Mosque of Riyadh (Saudi Arabia) and Old City Center Redevelopment, designed by Rasem Badran.
  - Porto School of Architecture in Portugal, designed by Álvaro Siza Vieira, is completed.
  - 1000 de La Gauchetière in Montreal, Quebec
  - 1501 McGill College in Montreal
  - 1250 René-Lévesque in Montreal, Canada
  - The Bank of America Corporate Center in Charlotte, North Carolina, United States is completed.
  - Collserola Tower in Barcelona, designed by Norman Foster, is completed.
  - Supreme Court of Israel in Jerusalem, designed by Ram Karmi and his sister Ada Karmi-Melamede, is opened.
  - Central Plaza in Hong Kong, China is completed.
  - Bank of America Plaza in Atlanta, Georgia, United States is completed.
  - Construction of the Georgia Dome in Atlanta, Georgia, United States, is completed.
  - The GLG Grand in Atlanta, Georgia, United States, is completed.
  - SunTrust Plaza in Atlanta, Georgia, United States, is completed.
  - The 225 South Sixth tower in Minneapolis, Minnesota, United States, is completed.
  - United Overseas Bank Plaza One in Singapore is completed.
  - Government offices, Rauma, Finland, designed by Jokela & Kareoja, are built.
  - Goetz Collection, Munich, by Herzog & de Meuron.
  - The Ark, London, designed by Ralph Erskine, is completed.
  - Maitland Robinson Library at Downing College, Cambridge, designed by Quinlan Terry.
  - Møller Centre at Churchill College, Cambridge, designed by Henning Larsen, is opened.
  - Männistö Church, Kuopio, Finland, designed by Juha Leiviskä, is built.
  - Church of St Jan Kanty, Kraków, Poland, designed by Krzysztof Bień, is completed.
  - Fountains Abbey Visitor Centre, England, by Edward Cullinan Architects, is completed.
  - Punta del Hidalgo Lighthouse on Tenerife is completed (illuminated 1994).
  - Central Radio and TV Tower in Beijing, China is completed.
  - The Telemax television tower in Hanover, Germany is completed.
  - The Zizkov Television Tower in Prague, Czech Republic, is completed.

== Awards ==
- AIA Gold Medal – Kevin Roche
- Alvar Aalto Medal – Glenn Murcutt
- Architecture Firm Award – James Stewart Polshek and Partners.
- Carlsberg Architectural Prize – Tadao Ando
- European Union Prize for Contemporary Architecture (Mies van der Rohe Prize) – Esteve Bonell and Francesc Rius for Municipal Sports Stadium, Barcelona.
- Grand Prix de l'urbanisme – Antoine Grumbach.
- Grand prix national de l'architecture – Christian de Portzamparc.
- Praemium Imperiale Architecture Laureate – Frank Gehry
- Pritzker Prize – Alvaro Siza.
- RAIA Gold Medal – Glenn Murcutt.
- RIBA Royal Gold Medal – Peter Rice.
- Twenty-five Year Award – Salk Institute for Biological Studies.

== Deaths ==
- February 22 – Aarno Ruusuvuori, Finnish architect (born 1925)
- April 27 – Sir James M. Richards, English architectural writer (born 1907)
- March 20 – Lina Bo Bardi, Italian-born Brazilian modernist architect (born 1914)
- June 25 – Sir James Stirling, British architect (born 1926)
- November 10 – Sir John Summerson, English architectural historian (born 1904)
