= Copyright law of Japan =

Japanese copyright laws (著作権法, Chosakukenhō) consist of two parts: "Author's Rights" and "Neighbouring Rights". As such, "copyright" is a convenient collective term rather than a single concept in Japan. Japan was a party to the original Berne convention in 1899, so its copyright law is in sync with most international regulations. The 1899 law protected copyrighted works for 30 years after the author's death. Law changes promulgated in 1970 extended the duration to 50 years (or 50 years after publication for unknown authors and corporations). However, in 2004 Japan further extended the copyright term to 70 years for cinematographic works; for films released before 1971, the copyright term also spans 38 years after the director's death.

At the end of 2018, as a result of the Trans-Pacific Partnership negotiations and a requirement stemming from the EU–Japan Economic Partnership Agreement, the 70 year term was applied to all works. This new term was not applied retroactively; works that had entered the public domain between 1999 and 29 December 2018 (inclusive) due to expiration remained in the public domain.

== English translation ==
The definitive version of Japanese law regarding copyright exists only in Japanese text. An official English-language translation of the law does not exist, but the Japanese Ministry of Justice has a website called "Japanese Law Translation" where one can search for Japanese laws and their unofficial English translation. IP laws such as Patent Act, Copyright Act, Trademark Act, Design Act and Unfair Competition Prevention Act are included there.

Reliable information on Japanese copyright law in English is also provided by the websites of Intellectual Property High Court, "Transparency of Japanese Law Project", European Patent Office, and Copyright Research and Information Center (CRIC). For more details, see "External links" at the bottom of this page.

== Author's rights ==
=== Applicability ===
Japanese copyright law protects all works "in which thoughts or sentiments are expressed in a creative way, and which falls within the literary, scientific, artistic or musical domain." The laws automatically provide the following rights, without the need for formal declaration or registration.

=== Moral rights ===
- Divulgence: The author can choose when and how a work will be made available to the public.
- Authorship: The author can choose how their authorship is represented in the work (e.g., under pseudonym or anonymity).
- Integrity: The author can control the modification of a work.

"Moral rights" (人格権 jinkaku-ken) are non-transferable; they remain with the author until they expire. Although moral rights themselves cannot be waived, the exercise of moral rights is waived by contract, when, for example, an employee or contractor creates a derivative work of their employer's or principal's product. In such a situation, the moral rights would technically remain with the creator, but the creator would be potentially liable for breach of contract if they attempt to exercise those rights.

=== Economic rights ===
- Reproduction: The author can control the reproduction of a work, including photography, recording, and downloading.
- Communication: The author can control how a work is to be transmitted, communicated, broadcast, performed, exhibited, etc., including how copies of the work are to be distributed.
- Adaptation: The author can control the adaptation of a work through translation, dramatization, cinematization, and the creation of derivative works in general.

Unlike moral rights, economic rights can be freely transferred or relinquished. If the author transfers their economic rights to another, the holder of the economic rights becomes the "copyright holder", but the author retains authorship.

== Neighboring rights ==
"Neighboring rights" (隣接権 rinsetsu-ken) refer to the rights of performers, broadcasters, and other individuals who do not author works, but play an important role in communicating them to the public.

=== Performers' rights ===
Performers generally have two non-transferable moral rights:

- Authorship, or control over how they are named in connection with the work; and
- Integrity, or control over the alteration of a performance, in a manner that would prejudice the performer's reputation.

Live performers have the transferable economic rights of fixation (control over recording), making available (control over publication in interactive media such as the internet), and diffusion (control over diffusion by wire or broadcast).

Fixed aural performers have the transferable economic rights of fixation and making available, as well as transfer of ownership, and rental. They can also demand remuneration if their work is broadcast or diffused by wire.

=== Phonogram producers' rights ===
Phonogram producers have the same economic rights as fixed aural performers, but do not have any moral rights.

=== Broadcasters' and wire diffusers' rights ===
Broadcasters and wire diffusers have the transferable economic rights of fixation, reproduction, making available, and retransmission. Television broadcasters also have a right to control photography of their broadcasts.

== Limitations and exceptions ==
=== Artistic works ===
Artistic works permanently installed in public places can be reproduced freely by photograph, film, etc. However, except for architecture, the author's permission must be obtained before publicly exhibiting their work, and commercial reproductions of artistic works are not permitted without the author's permission.

=== Educational use ===
Teachers at non-profit educational institutions are permitted to reproduce copyrighted works for the purpose of teaching, as long as such reproduction does not infringe on the interests of the author. For example, a teacher may duplicate a television program or audio recording, but may not distribute copies of educational software without express permission. Works can also be reproduced in examinations at educational institutions, but the author must be remunerated if the exam is performed for-profit.

=== News ===
Unless a newspaper or wire service article specifically states that it cannot be reproduced, free reproduction is permitted. Normally, copyrighted materials can also be reproduced to the extent necessary for reporting of current events (this extends to printed matter, film, and photographs).

=== Non-profit performance ===
Works can be performed or exhibited freely if the performer is not remunerated, and the audience is not charged an admission fee.

=== Political speeches ===
Political speeches and government proceedings can be freely reproduced, except when the intent of the reproduction is to create an anthology of the author's works.

=== Publication for the blind ===
Braille and audio versions of printed materials may be reproduced for the purpose of lending, but not for commercial use.

=== Quotation ===
Works may be quoted freely, as long as the quotation does not exceed what is justified for its purpose.

=== Software ===
Software can be reproduced for personal use. If one of the above exceptions to reproduce a work publicly is used, the person reproducing the work must cite its source.

In 2009, Japanese copyright law was updated to allow the following digitally focused limitations and exceptions.

=== Copying by search engines ===
Copying on servers of in-copyright works in order to provide search engine–type services.

=== Orphan works ===
The use of an orphan work, an in-copyright work whose owner cannot be found, on the internet, subject to approval from the Japanese Ministry of Culture.

=== Use of artistic works on the internet ===
Reflecting the popularity of online auction websites like eBay, the use of an image of an in-copyright work, on the internet when advertising something for sale.

=== Text and data mining ===
The analysis of in-copyright works using computers (Art.47 septies) in order to extract statistics and information, and come up with new ideas. Japan was the first country in the world to introduce an exception for text mining as well as data mining in 2009.

=== Temporary copying ===
Caching, storing, copying etc.

=== Shinkokuzai ===
Uses of copyrighted material that are not otherwise sanctioned by the copyright owner or by statute may be categorized as shinkokuzai (Japanese: 親告罪), meaning that they cannot be prosecuted unless the copyright owner complains. Former Prime Minister Shinzo Abe affirmed that doujinshi, self-published manga often based on existing works, "don't compete in the market with the original works and don't damage the original creators' profits, so they are shinkokuzai."

== Public domain ==
Even when particular materials are said to be "in the public domain" there can be some use restrictions. In such cases, the term copyright-free is sometimes used instead. Many pre-1955 Japanese and non-Japanese films are considered to be in the public domain in Japan. An author's work may be put into the public domain 70 years after the individual dies, unless the publisher re-publishes the work.

== Length of protection ==
Works authored by an individual, under their own name or a known pseudonym, are protected for 70 years following the individual's death. Works authored anonymously or pseudonymously, as well as works authored by corporations, where the individual author or authors are unknown, are protected for 70 years following publication. Prior term lengths were set at 30 years until 6 May 1970 and 50 years until 30 December 2018.

Cinematographic works are protected for 70 years following publication (or 70 years following creation if unpublished). This update was made in 2004 to be more consistent with some other nations, notably the United States and most of Europe, as the previous term was fifty years.

In 2006, following a lawsuit from Paramount Pictures, the Tokyo District Court said that the 2004 law cannot be applied retroactively, so that all cinematographic works published (or created, if unpublished) before 1953 are now public domain.

In 2007, following a lawsuit from Toho over the rights to Akira Kurosawa's films, the Tokyo District Court appended that for films released in 1970 or earlier, copyright protection is extended until 38 years after the original copyright holder's (i.e. the director's) death, thus bringing hundreds of public domain films back into copyright. As Kurosawa died in 1998, his copyrights are expected to expire at the end of 2036 or 2068.

Neighboring rights apply for 70 years after the work is performed, transmitted, or put on sale.

Works authored by, or transferred to, residents of countries which were Allied Powers in World War II, before the effectuation of the San Francisco Peace Treaty, are given some prolonged protection by an exemption law. This extension compensates for the unprotected period in World War II, and varies with the country of the author or the copyright holder in the wartime. For copyrights before December 8, 1941, the prolongation is normally 3,794 days (including Australia, Canada, France, United Kingdom, and the United States), but some countries ratified later, and have longer wartime (the longest is 4,413 days for Lebanon). For works published between December 8, 1941 to the date when the San Francisco Peace Treaty became effective, the prolongation is the number of days between the publication of the work and when the San Francisco Peace Treaty became effective for the country.

== Recent developments ==
=== Compensation system for digital private recording ===
In 1992, the "Compensation System for Digital Private Recording" was introduced. According to this system, those who make digital sound or visual recordings for personal use should pay compensation to the copyright owners. This compensation is added in advance to the prices of specified digital recording equipment (DAT, DCC, MD, CD-R, CD-RW), and specified recording media (DVCR, D-VHS, MVDISC, DVD-RW, DVD-RAM) (Japan Copyright Office 2001, 17; ibid. 24).

The compensation is collected and distributed by SARAH (Society for the Administration of Remuneration for Audio Home Recording) and SARVH (Society for the Administration of Remuneration for Video Home Recording). The users of this equipment and media have to pay a fee, or "compensation", so that they can use the described materials for copying the copyright-protected works. The public domain is not directly threatened, but in an indirect way, it becomes more difficult (expensive) to reproduce works for personal use.

=== Downloadable audio for mobile phones ===
The only way to get these downloadable audio files is by creating a sort of user account on a provider's website, and agreeing with a click-wrap contract that allows a user to download a certain number of audio files for a fixed payment. This kind of system is in fact a kind of trusted system, although we may not be aware of it.

Mamoru Kato, a JASRAC executive, said during a press conference after having set new fees for downloadable audio (in cooperation with the Network Music Rights Conference), that "the(se) new agreements will help enlighten Internet users, many of whom believe music can freely be copied from the Net. We have to teach them that you should not use other people's assets for free, by opening up a legal window for them to use" (The Japan Times Online, 18 August 2000). In other words, the clever user who tries to free-ride on the original genius of the creator of this or that audio file has to be educated, and forced to participate in a trusted system in order to obtain the desired audio files. No one has so far mentioned about either fair use or the reach of the public domain.

The above examples show that if trusted systems (and look-alikes) intend to play an important role in the future without intruding on anonymity, etc., one will have to incorporate these values as gaps in the architecture of these systems. It is, however, doubtful whether this will happen.

=== Right of communication to the public ===
In 1997, the Japanese Copyright Law was updated to expand the coverage of the author's "right of communication to the public" (established in 1986 under the name of Rights of Broadcasting and Wire Transmission) to the stage of making it transmittable. The objects of the right of communication to the public are the activities of connecting a server to a network, and the activities of transmission (Fujiwara 1999, 98).

The Copyright Law defines the concepts, "public transmission" (Copyright Law, Article 2, paragraph 1 (7-2)), and "interactive transmission" (Copyright Law, Article 2, paragraph 1 (9-4)):

- "Public transmission" means "the transmission of radio communication or wire-telecommunication intended for direct reception by the public". In order to deal with the new context of the Internet, the (already existing) concept of interactive transmission (websites, video-on-demand, etc.) made a theoretical move, and is now considered as residing under public transmission (besides wire diffusion and broadcasting) (Japan Copyright Office 2001, 30).
- Interactive transmission stands for "the public transmission made automatically in response to a request from the public" (read: in response to a click with the mouse on a hyperlink).

Besides these two definitions, Article 23 (1) of the Copyright Law provides that the "author shall have the exclusive right to make the public transmission of his or her work (including the making transmittable of his or her work in the case of the interactive transmission)". This can be considered an expansion of the right of public transmission of authors to the preceding stage of making transmittable, available (Fujiwara 1999, 98-99; Japan Copyright Office 2001, 31), and even of a right of making transmittable that goes further than the WIPO Copyright Treaty (Ficsor 2002, 506).

Apart from this, and in order to comply with the WIPO Performances and Phonograms Treaty, a right of making transmittable was also granted to performers and phonogram producers. The scope here is especially to regulate the internet broadcasting of live performances (Fujiwara 1999, 98; Japan Copyright Office 2001, 31).

At first sight, one should say that the law was adapted to the new possibilities, the Internet provides—uploading content to a server, and accessing context via hyperlinks. Indeed, as the difference between simultaneous and non-simultaneous receptions fades (The Japanese Multimedia Report (Ficsor 2002, 198)), it seems to make sense to expand the right of public transmission of authors also to the stage of making transmittable (i.e., "uploading of content to a server that is accessible by the public"). But on the other hand, when we look at it from the viewpoint of the public domain, the wider reach of the concept of communication to the public means a big limitation of the reach of this public domain.

This is not a discourse against "copyright protection". Indeed, in a lot of cases, copyright protection seems to work as a system, and creates an incentive to produce. We only should be aware that the current transformations in the legislation concerning intellectual property rights—in Japan and in other countries—is moving very fast, and do not seem to take into account all facets of the story, nor remember the very basic goal of copyright, which is "to contribute to the development of culture". While copyright protection is an urgent task, excessive protection that allows for no copying "may damage the functioning of society that thrives on impartiality and imitation" (The Japan Times Online, 21 February 2002).

=== Copyright management business law ===
In November 2000, the "Copyright Management Business Law" (著作権等管理事業法 Chosakuken-tou kanri jigyou hou) was enacted. Its main purpose is to facilitate the establishment of new copyright management businesses, in order to "respond to the development of digital technologies and communication networks" (Japan Copyright Office 2001, 27). In general, we can say that this law will facilitate the rise of copyright management businesses, and possibly create a further limitation to the reach of the public domain.

In its book, "Copyright System in Japan", the title of this section is to "secure the effectiveness of rights by utilizing new technologies" (Japan Copyright Office 2001, 32). This shows clearly that the Japanese government considers software to be a tool for enforcing copyright legislation. Not mentioned, however, is the possible negative side-effects concerning fair use (limitation on rights), or the reach of the public domain.

Under the section (in the same book) pertaining to the "(r)egulation of the circumvention of technological measures such as copy protection, etc.", it is stated that "transfer to the public (of) the ownership of, and manufacture, etc. of, the devices to circumvent technological measures (e.g., copy protection), which prevent copying of videogram (sic) or music CD without authorization, are regulated by the (sic) criminal penalty" (Japan Copyright Office 2001, 32). It is quite clear that with this regulation, it becomes impossible to circumvent the copyright-protection of intellectual property in the context of fair use. This means that when a CD, etc. is copyright-protected, there is not only technically no space for fair use, but also from the legislative side, there is no support for copying in the context of fair use.

The "regulation of the alteration etc. of the rights management information" section strengthens the first regulation by saying that it is forbidden to remove rights management information attached to the work. However, it is to be said that this provision, and such, does not seem to limit immediately the reach of the public domain. Mentioning the source, etc. of the quoted material is generally considered as appropriate.

=== Right of transfer of ownership ===
As stated by the Japan Copyright Office, the "right of transfer of ownership" was established in 1999, in order to enrich the rights of authors. This means that authors, performers and phonogram producers can exercise their right concerning the transfer of the ownership of the original, or copies of the work, at the first legal transfer. After this, the right will be extinguished (Japan Copyright Office 2001, 32). This new ruling can be considered as a contribution to the recent strengthening of author-centered regimes.

=== Right of presentation ===
Another aspect of the 1999 amendment to the Japanese Copyright Law was the so called extension of the "right of presentation". Previously, this right was only granted to cinematographic work (Japan Copyright Office 2001, 32). After the amendment, it was extended to all kinds of works, reaffirming at the same time, exactly as in the right of transfer of ownership, the importance of the notion of the author.

== Criticism ==
=== Lobbying influence ===
The JASRAC, an umbrella group of copyright companies and organizations such as Eirin, Japan Commercial Broadcasters Organization, and the Recording Industry Association of Japan, has been pushing for the criminalization of illegal downloading since September 2007. Although most of the comments received by the government were in opposition to the proposal, on December 18, the Agency of Cultural Affairs proposed to ban illegal downloading, because Makoto Kawase, the head of the agency's Copyrighted Work Circulation Promotion Department, said that despite the mass opposition, the change was inevitable. The prohibition came into effect in 2010 after heavy lobbying by the RIAJ, one of JASRAC's members.

Shinzo Abe had been accused of promoting restrictive and harsh copyright policies in Japan, putting excessive attention to copyright infringement of manga, and for a proposal by the Agency for Cultural Affairs to criminalize all illegal downloading and private copying of works. This caused concerns in 2019 that Abe would lose an election. There is a consensus that excessive attention has been made on the manga industry on the decision to criminalize illegal downloading of manga.

=== Criminalization of downloading ===
The Japanese copyright law has been accused of being increasingly harsh and restrictive on consumers in recent years, with disproportionate penalties for downloading. Following lobbying by the RIAJ, in June 2009, the copyright law was amended to make it illegal to download copyrighted material uploaded without the author's permission, effective from January 1, 2010. However, no criminal penalties were defined until October 2012, when starting from then, illegally downloading music and movies can be punished by a fine of 2 million yen and imprisonment of 2 years. An emergency statement made by academics, lawyers, and experts and severe concern over an "Internet atrophy", causing an amendment to expand the criminal penalties for downloading to other categories to be shelved.

However, an amendment in June 2020 criminalized the downloading of manga, magazines and academic texts from illegal sources, despite copying short excerpts and accidentally copying from illegal sources being allowed as a compromise, effective on January 1, 2021. Operating a "leech site", which links or index sites that provide links to infringing content, also became punishable with 5 years imprisonment or a fine of 5 million yen. These amendments have spawned outcry from internet blog Techdirt, which said that the increasingly restrictive penalties in the copyright law violate Article 37(1) of the Penal Code, which states that "An act unavoidably performed to avert a present danger to the life, body, liberty or property of oneself or any other person is not punishable only when the harm produced by such act does not exceed the harm to be averted". Techdirt described the limitations on short excerpts and unintentional downloading as "unclear" and also criticized the penalties for linking to "leech sites" as disproportionate for merely linking to copyrighted material.

== See also ==
- Japanese patent law
- Japanese trademark law
- Japanese design law
- Japanese law
