= Right to Make Transmittable =

Right granted under Japanese copyright law

The Right to Make Transmittable is one of several rights granted to the creators of creative works by Japanese copyright law. The law defines copyright not as a single comprehensive right but as a bundle of various rights including right of reproduction, right of performance, right of screen presentation and right of public transmission.

== Overview ==
The right to make transmittable is the right to make works transmittable by some technical measures including uploading the works such as cinematographic works including TV programs and films on the internet. The right was newly established by the amendment to the Copyright Act of Japan in 1997.

Article 23, Paragraph 1 of the Copyright Act of Japan provides that the author shall have the exclusive right to effect a public transmission of their work (including, in the case of automatic public transmission, making their work transmittable). The provision makes it clear that the right to make transmittable as well as the right of public transmission, the right to transmit by wireless communications or wire-telecommunications that had already been protected before the amendment, shall be exclusively attributed to the author. To make transmittable is to record or input information on public server which is connected to the network provided for use by the public or to connect such public server that stores such information to the internet. This right is commonly called the right to upload but in fact, it is broader concept than simply to upload.

== Attribution of the right to make transmittable ==
As mentioned above, authors shall have the exclusive right to publicly transmit their work. Under Article 17 of the Copyright Act of Japan, copyright shall be attributed to authors upon the creation of works. Under the Copyright Act of Japan, definition of authors can differ depending on the types of works as mentioned below.

Author is defined as a person who creates the work under Article 2, Paragraph 1, Item 2 of the Copyright Act of Japan. This definition applies to most of the works which are defined as production in which thoughts or sentiments are expressed in a creative way and which falls within the literary, scientific, artistic or musical domain including linguistic work such as novel, music, dancing, art and architecture, other than some exceptions including works made by employees in the course of their duties cinematographic works, as mentioned below.

=== Exceptions ===
The law also mentions how rights will be granted in a number of special cases where the work is jointly produced.

==== Work made by an employee in the course of his duties ====
With respect to a work (except a computer program work) which on the initiative of an employer is made by an employee in the course of the performance of his duties in connection with the employer's business and is made public by the employer as a work under its own name, such employer shall be treated as the author unless otherwise stipulated by contract, work regulations or the like at the time of creation of the work.

With respect to computer code which, on the initiative of an employer is made by an employee in the course of his duties in connection with the employer's business, such employer shall be treated as the author unless otherwise stipulated by contract, work regulations or the like at the time of creation of the work.

==== Cinematographic work ====
With respect to a cinematographic work, basically, the authors is a person who, by taking charge of producing, directing, filming, art direction, etc., has creatively contributed to the creation of such cinematographic work as a whole. However, in the case where such author of the cinematographic work has undertaken to participate in the making of the cinematographic work, the maker of said cinematographic work, the person who takes the initiative in, and the responsibility for the making of the cinematographic work shall be treated as the author.

With respect to the works such as TV programs, which were created mainly for broadcasting, the right to make transmittable only covers the activity of inputting information into an automatic public transmission server already connected to a telecommunications line which is provided for use by the public shall be attributed to broadcasting organizations.

==== Performers, producers of phonograms, broadcasting organization and wire-broadcasting organizations ====
The Copyright Act of Japan, as well as the copyright attributed to authors, provides certain special rights called "neighboring rights" for performers, producers of phonograms, broadcasting organization and wire-broadcasting organizations, which play important roles in creation and distribution of the works, in order to promote distribution by protecting their rights. Under the Copyright Act of Japan, the right to make transmittable is also provided as one of such neighboring rights of performers, producers of phonograms, broadcasting organization and wire-broadcasting organizations, as well as the right that constitutes copyright of authors. The Copyright Act of Japan provides that the right to make transmittable shall be exclusively attributed to such performers, producers of phonograms, broadcasting organization and wire-broadcasting organizations. Accordingly, to upload cinematographic works on internet, it is basically necessary to obtain approval from relevant authors, performers, producers of phonograms, broadcasting organization and wire-broadcasting organizations. Under Article 92-2, Paragraph 2, Item 2 of the Copyright Act of Japan, performers shall not have the right to make transmittable with respect to their performance recorded on cinematographic works except sound recordings. Under the Copyright Act of Japan, basically, rights of performers are established under the principle that performers should collect compensation for their performance in a lump sum when they first permit their performance to be utilized, and the allocation of profits obtained by utilizing their performance afterwards should be determined by the agreement that performers should enter into at that time. Such principle is established in purpose of promoting the distribution of works by gathering the rights on fewer numbers of people and preventing complicated legal relations from arising due to the large numbers of people related to the works. However, such principle basically does not apply to the recordings of sound such as soundtrack to cinematographic works and to upload such recordings of sound, it is necessary to obtain permission from relevant performers such as singers.

==== Derivative works ====
Further, under Article 28 of the Copyright Act of Japan, it is provided that the author of the original work shall have exclusive rights of the same types as those possessed by the author of the derivative work. For example, in the case where a film is made based on a story of a cinematographic work, the right to make transmittable with respect to the cinematographic work is exclusively attributed to the author of the novel as well as the author of the cinematographic work. To upload such a cinematographic work on to the internet, it is necessary to obtain approval from the author of the novel as well as the parties that have the right to make transmittable with respect to the cinematographic work, such as the author of the cinematographic work.

== Remedies for infringement ==
Infringement of right to make transmittable is unauthorized use of right to make transmittable. Against the infringement of the right to make transmittable, civil remedies and criminal punishment as mentioned below are provided under laws of Japan.

=== Civil remedies ===
==== Injunctions ====
The holder of right to make transmittable may demand that persons infringing, or presenting a risk of infringing on his right cease the infringement or not infringe, as the case may be. Article 112, Paragraph 1 of the Copyright Act of Japan. When making the demand provided for in the preceding paragraph, the holder of the right may demand the taking of measures necessary to effect the cessation or prevention of the infringement, such as the destruction of objects constituting the acts of infringement, objects made by acts of infringement, and/or machines and tools used exclusively for acts of infringement.

==== Compensation for damage ====
In the Copyright Act of Japan, there is no provision regarding compensation for damage as a remedy against infringement of the right to make transmittable. However, the holder of the right may make a claim for damages against person who infringes the right pursuant to Article 709 of the Civil Code of Japan, a provision of tort.

==== Claim for unjust enrichment ====
Unauthorized use of other's work is to obtain profit without any legitimate reason and the holder of the right to make transmittable may make a claim for unjust enrichment pursuant to Article 703 of the Civil Code of Japan.

=== Criminal punishment ===
The person who infringes the right to make transmittable shall be punishable by imprisonment with work for a term not more than ten years or by a fine of not more than ten million Yen, or by both.

== Challenges facing Japanese online content business ==
As mentioned above, under the Copyright Act of Japan, right to make transmittable shall be exclusively attributed to authors of original works, and performers, producers of a phonogram, broadcasting organizations and wire-broadcasting organizations as well as authors. Accordingly, for example, as for phonograms, not only producers but also performers such as singers who performed in the phonograms exclusively shall have the right to make transmittable. As a result, to upload such phonograms on internet, it is necessary to obtain permission from all of the relevant parties who are provided with the right to make transmittable under the Copyright Act of Japan, including producers and performers who contributed to creation of the phonograms. However, it is practically very difficult since the number of such parties can be enormous. As a result, it is criticized that such legal system prevents Japanese online content business from further developing by making fewer works practically available for such business.

== Proposals for reform ==
To overcome the difficulties facing Japanese online content business mentioned above, there have been discussions regarding reform of the Copyright Act of Japan. Proposals regarding establishment of the "Internet Right" were made by the Forum of Digital Content Experts, a Japanese private research institute in 2008. The proposals mainly include three topics: (1) Establishment of "Internet Right" which is the right to use digital content including TV program, film and music on internet, and provision of such right to companies which can be evaluated to have sufficient ability to achieve the fair allocation of the profits, such as broadcasting organization, maker of a cinematographic work and record company; (2) Establishment of obligation to fair allocation of the profits; and (3) establishment of rules regarding fair use, by reforming the Copyright Act of Japan. According to the proposals, by such amendment, online content business can upload such works on internet by making contracts with parties provided with the "Internet Right". Also, according to the proposals, under the reformed act, exercise of copyright will be restricted and instead, owner of the copyright and neighboring right may claim compensation.

=== Opposition ===
There has been strong opposition to the proposals regarding the "Internet Right" mentioned above. According to the opinion of opponents, establishment of such "Internet Right" can impose unfair restriction on exercise of copyright and neighboring rights and there is no reason to make special arrangement only for use of digital content on internet. This issue has been discussed at the Ministry of Internal Affairs and Communications of Japan since 2008 but due to the strong opposition, the discussions have not seen any prominent progress.

== Comparison to U.S. Copyright Law ==
With respect to civil remedies, there is not material difference between U.S. legal system and Japanese legal system with respect to the remedies against infringement of copyright, considering actually almost same kind of actions may be taken by the owner of right as civil remedies under both legal systems. However, there are some differences between each system such as that there is not any provision regarding compensation for damage in the Copyright Act of Japan while there is such provision in the Copyright Act of the United States. On the contrary, with respect to criminal punishment, there is material difference between U.S. legal system and Japanese legal system with respect to gravity of sentence. Under the Copyright of Japan, the person who infringes the right to make transmittable shall be punishable by imprisonment with work for a term not more than ten years notwithstanding type of offense, while under the Copyright Act of the United States, the person who infringes copyright shall be punishable by imprisonment whose length can differ depending on type of offense and other conditions provided in the act. This is the consequence of the amendment of the Copyright Act of Japan in 2006 which strengthened the punishment based on the opinion that gravity of the criminal punishment against infringement of intellectual property right should be equivalent to that of robbery provided in the Penal Code of Japan. From the perspective of comparative law study, it is said that the criminal punishment against robbery is grave in comparison to other countries' legal systems, and that made criminal punishment against infringement of the right to make transmittable grave in comparison to other countries' legal systems.
