= Doorways to Horror =

Board game

- Designers: Sid Sackson
- Publishers: Pressman Toy Corporation
- Publication: 1986; 40 years ago
- Genres: Horror
- Players: 2–6
- Playing time: 60 minutes

Doorways to Horror is a horror board game played with a VCR designed by Sid Sackson and published in 1986 by Pressman Toy Corporation alongside Doorways to Adventure. Players scan through various doorways on a videotape recording, playing cards to capture creatures and win Gold Certificates in order to be the richest player by the end of the game. The tape includes clips from public domain media, including Cyrano De Bergerac, Africa Screams, Algiers, and The Terror.

== Gameplay ==
To set up, the five standing creature cards – vampire, werewolf, monster, witch, and zombie – are dealt out between players. Each person also receives 10–20 Power chips and seven cards from a deck of Spell cards (which have values from 3 to 10), Capture cards, and Power Shift cards. The number of creatures and Power chips dealt is determined by the number of players.

To start each round, players randomly select a door by using Pressman's "Colorscan" method: rolling a colored die and then scanning forward on the VCR to the indicated door. Entering the door plays a clip from a public domain horror film or TV show and flashes images of up to three creatures on the screen. While the footage plays, players place one Spell card on each creature they own that is flashed on the screen. They can also play Capture cards to steal other players' creatures, along with any Spell cards placed on them. Once the clip has ended, the tape reveals which creature was the Main creature and which were the Minor creatures. Each player receives Gold Certificates equal to the total value of Spell cards played on each creature they own, with the main Creature being worth double.

Players then bid for control of the Main creature by each playing two Spell cards face down on the table. Once the cards are revealed, the player with the highest bid takes the creature and it can't be stolen in the next round. The player with the lowest bid loses a Power chip. During the bidding, players can choose to play a Power Shift card – either Loss of Strength (causes the lowest bidder to lose an additional Power chip) or Protection (causes the lowest bidder to lose one less Power chip) – that they have instead of one of their Spell Cards. Players draw up to four cards before starting the next round.

The videotape occasionally features penalty stops which indicate either a restriction on cards or creatures, and any players breaking that restriction must pay the indicated Gold Certificate fee. The game ends when either a player runs out of Power chips or the tape ends, and the player with the most Gold Certificates by the end is the winner.

== Reception ==
In a review for Asimov's Science Fiction, Matthew Costello praised the game, saying that "Having the standup creatures to cast spells on makes you watch the tape more closely [and] these clips are fun to watch." He noted that because many VCRs do not have a fast scan function, players using them cannot scan to the next doorway without seeing the intervening scenes, and ultimately concluded that "while [Doorways to Horror is] well-designed and entertaining, the videotape... is superfluous." Costello expanded on this in a review for Issue 84 of Games, stating that "Though it does not completely solve the tricky problem of how to make the most effective use of a videotape in game play, Doorways to Horror is a worthwhile and interesting diversion."

Writing for Video, Timothy Onosko praised the game for its Colorscan randomizing technique and the color blind accessible gameplay of the colored dice also being identifiable by indented initials. However, similar to Costello, Onosko also described the slow scanning speed on VCRs as a negative effect on players's enjoyment, and noted that "Without a scan or a visual search feature on your VCR, you really can’t comfortably play either Doorways game."

In Issue 6 of Lunchmeat, lead editor Josh Schafer described the Doorways games as "hilarious to play, and without a doubt some of the best entries in the interactive VHS experiment."
