= JIPA =

JIPA may refer to:

- Japan Intellectual Property Association
- Journal of the International Phonetic Association
