= PAJ =

PAJ stands for

- PAJ (journal), originally Performing Arts Journal, a triannual art magazine
- Parachinar Airport's IATA code
- Industrial Property Digital Library or Patent Abstracts of Japan, a database of English abstracts of Japanese patent documents
- Petroleum Association of Japan
