= Japanese design law =

Japanese design law is determined by the Design Act (意匠法, Ishō-hō). Under this Act, only registered designs are legally protected, and it stipulates the procedure for obtaining a design registration in the Japan Patent Office. The protection for unregistered design is provided by the Unfair Competition Prevention Act (不正競争防止法, Fusei kyōsō bōshi-hō). The Act amended in 2019 to expand its scope of protections of graphic images and interior and exterior designs of the architectures, to extend the protection term to 25 years from the filing date, and to accept multiple designs filings.

== Definitions ==
A design is defined as the following subject matters "which creates an aesthetic impression through the eye";

- the shape, patterns or colors, or any combination thereof, of an article (including a part of an article),
- the shape of an architectural structure (including a part of an architectural structure), or
- the graphic image, which is provided for use in the operation of the article or is displayed as a result of performance of the article.

Designs may be subjected to the protection if:

- they are novel, that is if no identical design has been made available to the public before the filing date, and
- they are not easily created on the basis of publicly known designs or motifs.

== English translation ==
An official English-language translation of the law does not exist, but the Japanese Ministry of Justice's website, under the Japanese Law Translation section provides users with Japanese laws and their unofficial English translation. IP laws such as the Patent Act, Copyright Act, Trademark Act, Design Act and the Unfair Competition Prevention Act are included there.

In addition, the J-PlatPat offers the public access to IP Gazettes of the Japan Patent Office (JPO) free of charge through the internet.

Reliable information on Japanese IP law in English is also provided by the websites of the Intellectual Property High Court, Japan Patent Office, Transparency of Japanese Law Project, European Patent Office, and the Institute of Intellectual Property (IIP) of Japan.

== See also ==
- Japanese patent law
- Japanese copyright law
- Japanese trademark law
- Japanese law
