= Milk (Garbage song) =

1996 single by Garbage

Single by Garbage featuring Tricky

from the album Garbage
- Released: October 7, 1996
- Recorded: April 1994 – May 1995
- Studio: Smart (Madison, Wisconsin)
- Genre: Alternative rock
- Length: 3:56
- Label: Mushroom, Almo Sounds
- Songwriter: Garbage
- Producer: Garbage

Garbage singles chronology
"Stupid Girl" (1996)	"Milk" (1996)	"#1 Crush" (1997)

Tricky singles chronology
"Grassroots" (1996)	"Milk" (1996)	"Christiansands" (1996)

"Milk" is a song by American alternative rock band Garbage from their self-titled debut studio album (1995). Written and produced by the band, the song was released internationally the following year as the album's fifth and final single. Garbage collaborated with trip hop musician Tricky on a new version of "Milk" for single release. Media reported that there was a rumoured fall-out over the sessions, when it became known that Garbage produced another mix of "Milk" that only incorporated Tricky's vocals from that session.

After an acclaimed live performance of the new recording of the song at the 1996 MTV Europe Music Awards, "Milk (The Wicked Mix feat. Tricky)" debuted at number 10 on the UK Singles Chart. A mix without Tricky's vocal, "Milk (The Siren mix)", charted in Germany, Australia and New Zealand.

In North America, "Milk" was released alongside album cut "Supervixen" to build upon the momentum from the success of previous single "Stupid Girl". The single release was supported by Garbage's support slot for the Smashing Pumpkins Infinite Sadness arena tour and pre-empted the release of a home video compilation of all the band's music videos. Both "Milk" and "Supervixen" failed to chart when alternative radio chose to heavily support the band's soundtrack song "#1 Crush" instead.

== Background ==
"Milk" was written and recorded by the band at their own recording studio in Madison, Wisconsin during the 1994–95 sessions for Garbage, and was the first track that Shirley Manson wrote from scratch. Guitarist Duke Erikson had happened to walk past Manson as she strummed an acoustic guitar in their studio lounge. He thought the melody she was humming was interesting and took the idea to the rest of the band: Steve Marker and drummer Butch Vig. Within an hour, they had set up a mic in the control room, Vig programmed some drum loops, Marker played bass and Erikson fired up the mellotron. Shirley's vocal (aside from overdubs) was recorded in a single take facing the control room speakers. The main body of the song was recorded in 45 minutes. At a later point, Garbage recorded some ambient textures for the track, and even had a clarinet part recorded, but these were ultimately removed in favour of keeping the production simple. "It just had a really beautiful kind of feeling to it", explained Manson, "We tried to recreate it in the booth, but it just sounded flat." Vig elaborated: "When it came to mix, we just left it the way we had [originally] recorded it".

Manson had told the rest of the band [when she joined Garbage] that she was a songwriter, but the truth was that she had little input in the songwriting team that formed the core of her previous band: "As the lead singer, I was left most of the time with coming up with the melody and the licks," Manson remembered, ""Milk" was obviously augmented by the rest of Garbage, but the melody and the words are mine". She was inspired by a line in Michael Ondaatje's The Collected Works of Billy the Kid ("her throat is a kitchen") and alluded to it in her lyrics for the song. Manson later described the composition was "a seduction, almost like a siren song", "I really like the vulnerable and sinister side of "Milk". It sounds like it's an innocuous love song and it's not" and again elaborated further: "It's been dismissed by people as the ballad at the end of the album. To me "Milk" is the darkest, most hopeless of the songs. People say "Oh, it's lovey-dovey, so therefore it's a love song". But it's a very bleak song, it's about loss and the fear of loss; about things you can't have and things you will forever wait for."

== Remix collaboration ==
After Garbage's fifth single "Stupid Girl" had been released internationally, the band's record label were considering what the follow-up single would be; at one point "Supervixen", "Fix Me Now", and "Milk" were all considered. The band performed a headline concert at New York City's Roseland Ballroom in mid-April 1996 and were joined at the aftershow by English trip hop musician Tricky. The two groups hung out for the night, and decided to collaborate on a duet version of "Milk" featuring both Manson and Tricky on vocals. In May, the two acts spent a session in Chicago's CRC Studios working on the new recording. The session was setback with numerous glitches including a malfunctioning tape machine and a mixing console caught fire. Manson found the experience of working with a male vocalist "enchanting and illuminating". Tricky turned off all the lights in the vocal booth and pressed his mic against Manson's as they performed their parts.

Internet rumors abounded that the session had been a disaster, with the band's audio engineer claiming the results were not as expected, and that Tricky himself had been difficult to work with. The band's manager disputed the reported events, placing blame on problems at the recording studio. The band eventually put out a press statement to deny the rumours stating that the session had in fact gone well, the rework of "Milk" was still a work in progress and that further production by both Tricky and Garbage was required. Tricky finished his duet version of "Milk" in New York's Platinum Island Studios; Garbage completed their own guitar-led version of "Milk" in Madison during a break in their world tour. Garbage's rework was finished in two versions; the first was titled the Siren mix and featured only Manson's vocal; the second also incorporated Tricky's vocal and was titled the Wicked mix. Tricky took exception to Garbage releasing their own version as a single instead of his, and complained about the situation to the press.

== Release ==
"Milk" was first released as a single in Australia and New Zealand by Mushroom Records imprint label White. The single was released on October 7, 1996, on CD and cassette single and featured the Siren mix as the A-side, and was backed up with the Wicked mix, Tricky's remix and the original album version. The single coincided with the band's first live dates in both countries, which saw the release of a tour edition of the album reach number four on the ARIA chart and number one on the RIANZ chart. Garbage made their first televised performance on Australian television on Hey Hey It's Saturday performing the single. A second "Milk" CD single was subsequently issued to stores containing the B-side "Alien Sex Fiend", the band's own house mix of "Dog New Tricks", and remixes of "Milk", "Stupid Girl" and "Queer" by Rabbit In the Moon, Todd Terry and Danny Saber respectively. "Milk" debuted at number 48 on the Australian Singles Chart in early November 1996; the single then re-entered the chart in December and peaked at number 44. In New Zealand, "Milk" spent a single week at number 50.

The Wicked remix of "Milk" featuring Tricky impacted UK radio stations in mid-October 1996 and was A-listed by both BBC Radio 1 and Virgin Radio. "Milk" subsequently reached number 19 on the airplay chart. Mushroom pre-empted the UK release of "Milk" by issuing three limited "taster" 12-inch singles through HMV stores in late October; the actual commercial release was on November 11. Two CD singles and a limited-edition 7-inch vinyl were distributed to stores, each featuring the Wicked mix, and with remixes of "Milk" by Massive Attack, Goldie, Tricky and Rabbit in The Moon, and remixes of "Stupid Girl" by Danny Saber and Todd Terry spread across the formats. The 14,000 copy limited edition 7-inch vinyl format came housed in a white ripple-effect card sleeve, with a videogram image mounted on front, and a nine-panel white and blood red poster within. During the week of release, Garbage won the Best Breakthrough Act award and performed "Milk" live at the MTV Europe Music Awards in London. "Milk" debuted on the UK Singles Chart at number 10, becoming the band's second top-10 entry on the chart. To mark the high position, Garbage performed a live videolink performance of the song from Atlanta for broadcast on Top of The Pops. "Milk" spent eight weeks on the UK charts, and sold over 135,000 copies.

Across Europe, "Milk" received heavy support from radio, peaking at number three on Music & Media's Alternative Rock chart in December and climbing to number 24 on the European Top 50 airplay chart by January. Bertelsmann Music Group released two CD singles for "Milk", backed with remixes, to record stores. In Germany, modest sales of "Milk" led to a seven-week run on their singles chart, peaking at number 84.

In North America, Almo Sounds enacted a dual-single release strategy; "Supervixen" would go to alternative radio, followed by "Milk" at Triple A radio stations However, only "Milk" would be commercially released to retail, a cassette single initially, followed by the CD single a week later, both backed with the new versions and a Rabbit in the Moon remix. On November 18, Almo serviced additional Rabbit in the Moon mixes to nightclubs. The single sales of "Milk" posted a modest number-18 entry on the Bubbling Under Hot 100 Singles chart, which ranks the most popular songs in the United States that have yet to enter the Hot 100.

The chart impact of both singles was curtailed by the late October impact of a new remix of "#1 Crush" (from William Shakespeare's Romeo + Juliet: Music from the Motion Picture) on Capitol Records, which alternative stations quickly added, dropping "Supervixen" almost immediately from their playlists throughout the country. As the soundtrack was not on their label, Almo refused to support "#1 Crush" and were adamant on making "Milk" a hit. Despite this resistance, in January 1997, "#1 Crush" hit number one on the alternative charts in both the United States and Canada; and gain modest traction at Top 40 radio. Despite not gaining much traction at radio, commercial sales of "Milk" enabled the single to re-enter the Bubbling Under Hot 100 Singles chart at number 15 and peak a week later at number six and hanging on until at the end of February.

== Music video ==
The music video for "Milk" was shot in London by director Stéphane Sednaoui. Originally scheduled to shoot in Paris while the band were in France on tour, it was more-cost effective to relocate the shoot to the UK and fly the band over and back. Two edits were completed: a single-take version for the album mix and a second version with some extra shots of Shirley for the Wicked/Siren mix.

In the United States, VH1 added the "Milk" video to its playlist from November 11, MTV following suit. a week later. In December, MTV Europe certified the video a Buzz Bin clip.

The single-take album version "Milk" video was first commercially released on 1996's Garbage Video VHS and Video-CD. A remastered version (a hybrid of the footage from the remix dubbed with the album version) was included on Garbage's 2007 greatest hits DVD Absolute Garbage.

== Remixes ==
David Christophere, who produced under the name of Rabbit in the Moon, was solicited to remix Garbage by Butch Vig himself, through DJ Jason Bentley, after hearing Christophere's work on Sarah McLachlan's "Fear". He remixed "Milk", which was his preferred choice, after completing remixes of both "Queer" and "Stupid Girl". Christophere produced two versions of "Milk"; one downtempo ("Butchered Vegas mix"), and one in a club style ("Got It mix"), utilizing Manson's breathing vocal track over a house beat inspired by Deep Dish. Christophere sampled sounds from various sources, such as Pink Floyd, Kraftwerk, Madonna, Plastikman, Portishead and musical cues from Monty Python and Halloween in his mixes.

In the three weeks before the commercial release of "Milk", Mushroom distributed to HMV stores a three-part 12-inch vinyl set as a "taster release". These were limited to 500 copies each and were packaged in a die-cut embossed card sleeve (one leather look, one gravel, one rippled), each with a different Dayglo colour inner jacket to identify which mix it is. In May 1997, Mushroom pressed a set of four remix 12-inch vinyl (one each of "Queer" and "Stupid Girl", and two of "Milk") to record stores in plain black card sleeves. The first "Milk" 12-inch featured three remixes by Massive Attack and the second featured the two Goldie mixes.

In 2007, "Milk" was remastered and included on Garbage's greatest hits album Absolute Garbage. In 2015, "Milk", the Tricky remix, both Wicked and Siren mixes, and nine club remixes were remastered and released on Garbage (20th Anniversary Super Deluxe Edition). The digital bundle also included the previously unreleased "Primal mix" and "Ultra Classic Mix" by Massive Attack.

== Critical reception ==
In a review of the debut album for Kerrang!, Paul Rees called "Milk" an "elegant hymn", adding that "impressive and evocative of Ridley Scott's vision of the dark, decaying cityscape of future Los Angeles in Blade Runner. A year later, the same publication reviewed the "Wicked Mix", stating "a bristling, brilliant reworking of the album track... an inspired fusion. Deep blue shuddering beats and a guitar sound so chilled out it's virtually refrigerated." Jackie Hayden, in an album review for Hot Press, told readers to "pay attention to the "Strawberry Fields Forever"-keyboards which float in to make fleeting appearances". RASP! magazine declared the track the album's highlight, writing ""Milk", a song SexKylie would die for, is an indie-"Confide In Me" that soars ever upward in its frosty majesty". In their album review, The Guardian wrote, "Manson gives her dreamy all on this one, an unbearably lovely, lush ballad. "A divinely spooked, penumbral beauty", wrote Sharon O'Connell in her Melody Maker album write-up, "["Milk" recalls] Julee Cruise's work with Angelo Badalamenti". "Depeche Mode in a pensive mood" wrote Emma Morgan in her NME review, while her colleague M.B.'s write-up for their sister-title Vox described "Milk" as "a stoners midnight Manhattan taxi tour". Pippa Lang, in a review for Metal Hammer, referred to the subtle strain of sadness within songs such as "A Stroke of Luck" and "Milk", describing them as "beautifully melancholic pieces of trancey tragedy".

== Track listings ==
- Australian CD and cassette White D1380/C1380
1. "Milk – The Siren mix" – 4:02
2. "Milk – The Wicked mix" (featuring Tricky) – 4:02
3. "Milk – The Tricky mix" – 4:19
4. "Milk – album version" – 3:52
- Australian CD2 White D1519
1. "Milk – Rabbit in the Moon mix" – 5:49
2. "Stupid Girl – Tee's Radio mix" – 3:45
3. "Queer – Danny Saber mix" – 5:39
4. "Dog New Tricks – The Pal mix" – 4:02
5. "Alien Sex Fiend" – 4:37
- UK 12-inch taster (Rabbit in the Moon) Mushroom DJMILK1
1. "Milk – Got It mix" – 9:32
2. "Milk – Butchered Vegas mix" – 5:49
3. "Milk – Udder edit" – 4:23
- UK 12-inch taster (Goldie) Mushroom DJMILK2
1. "Milk – VIP Rufige Trash Your Shit mix" – 7:38
2. "Milk – Completely Trashed mix" – 6:31
- UK 12-inch taster (Massive Attack) Mushroom DJMILK3
1. "Milk – Trance mix" – 7:47
2. "Milk – D mix" – 4:50
- UK 7-inch single Mushroom Records SX1494
1. "Milk – The Wicked mix" (featuring Tricky) – 4:02
2. "Milk – The Tricky mix" – 4:19
- UK CD1 Mushroom Records D1494
1. "Milk – The Wicked Mix" (featuring Tricky) – 4:02
2. "Milk – Completely Trashed mix" – 6:31
3. "Milk – album version" – 3:52
4. "Stupid Girl – Tee's radio mix" – 3:45
- UK CD2 Mushroom Records DX1494
1. "Milk – The Wicked mix" (featuring Tricky) – 4:02
2. "Milk – Classic remix" – 4:47
3. "Milk – Udder remix" – 4:49
4. "Stupid Girl – Danny Saber remix" – 4:26
- US CD and cassette Almo Sounds AMSDS-89007/AMSCS-89007
1. "Milk – album version" – 3:52
2. "Milk – The Siren mix" – 4:02
3. "Milk – Udder remix" – 4:49
4. "Milk – The Wicked mix" (featuring Tricky) – 4:02
- Europe CD1 BMG 74321 42322 2
1. "Milk – The Siren mix" – 4:02
2. "Milk – Completely Trashed mix" – 6:31
3. "Milk – album version" – 3:52
4. "Stupid Girl – Tee's radio mix" – 3:45
- Europe CD2 BMG 74321 44018 2
1. "Milk – The Siren mix" – 4:02
2. "Milk – Classic remix" – 4:47
3. "Milk – Udder remix" – 4:49
4. "Milk – The Wicked mix" (featuring Tricky) – 4:02
- UK 12-inch (Milk Remixes) Mushroom TRASH14
1. "Milk – VIP Rufige Trash Your Shit mix" – 7:38
2. "Milk – Completely Trashed mix" – 6:31
- UK 12-inch (Milk Remixes) Mushroom TRASH14
1. "Milk – Classic remix" – 4:47
2. "Milk – Trance mix" – 7:47
3. "Milk – D mix" – 4:50

== Credits and personnel ==
- Music: Garbage
- Lyrics: Garbage
- Produced: Garbage
- Performed & mixed: Garbage
- 2nd engineer: Mike Zirkel
- Vocals : Shirley Manson
- Keyboards : Duke Erikson
- Samples & loops: Steve Marker
- Drums : Butch Vig
- Bass: Mike Kashou
- Recorded at Smart Studios, Madison, Wisconsin.

== Charts ==
=== Weekly charts ===
Chart (1996–1997)	Peak position
Australia (ARIA)	44
Europe (Eurochart Hot 100)	41
Germany (GfK)	84
Iceland (Íslenski Listinn Topp 40)	4
New Zealand (Recorded Music NZ)	50
Scottish Singles Sales (Official Charts)	8
UK Singles (Official Charts)	10
US Bubbling Under Hot 100 (Billboard)	6

=== Year-end charts ===
Chart (1997)	Position
Iceland (Íslenski Listinn Topp 40)	77

== Release history ==
Region	Date	Format	Label
Australia	October 7, 1996	2-CD single set; cassette single	White
United States	October 22, 1996	Airplay: Triple A	Almo Sounds
United States	November 5, 1996	Airplay: Top 40 radio	Almo Sounds
United Kingdom	November 11, 1996	2-CD single set; 7-inch single	Mushroom
Europe	November 11, 1996	2-CD maxi single set	BMG
United States	November 12, 1996	Cassette single	Almo Sounds
United States	November 19, 1996	CD single	Almo Sounds
United Kingdom	May 5, 1997	2-12-inch single set (as Milk Remixes)	Mushroom
