= Fumika Suzuki =

- Born: October 11, 1974 (age 50)
- Origin: Tochigi Prefecture, Japan
- Occupation(s): Model, Race queen, voice actress
- Years active: 1994—2005

Fumika Suzuki (鈴木 史華, Suzuki Fumika; born October 11, 1974 in Tochigi, Japan) is a Japanese voice actress, gravure idol and a former race queen in the 1990s.

Suzuki's race queen career started already in 1994 when she joined the sugo racing team. The following year, she represented the Japanese record company Avex Trax. However, it wasn't until she became Kure's official race queen in 1996 that Suzuki became a known name in the industry. In 1996, Suzuki released her first idol video titled "Black Velbet." In 1997, still modeling for Kure, Suzuki paired with Yoko Sugimura and was seen together in many race queen events, as well as several idol-oriented home video releases. Suzuki also appeared as an event girl for Minolta from 1998 to 2000.

As Suzuki's career gained speed, numerous photo books and idol videos were released, including "Deep F" (1998), "Six" (2001), "Natura" (2002) and "Will" (2003). Since 1998, Suzuki hasn't returned as a race queen, sticking to traditional modeling. Also, no idol videos or photo books have been released since 2003. After eleven years in the modeling business, Suzuki retired in summer 2005.
