= Rudolph Valentino Case =

SCOJ 353 (Ghi) of 2003
- Court: Supreme Court of Japan
- Full case name: Rudolph Valentino Case
- Decided: July 11, 2005

Laws applied
- Trademark Act

The Rudolph Valentino Case (ルドルフ・バレンチノ事件) is a 2005 decision of the Supreme Court of Japan concerning a trial for invalidation of a trademark named "RUDOLPH VALENTINO" based on its likelihood of causing confusion with the well-known Italian fashion brand "Valentino".

== Background ==
'X'(the applicant) owned a trademark called "RUDOLPH VALENTINO" (hereinafter, "X's Trademark") for clothing as the designated goods. Prior to the application to register 'X's Trademark', "VALENTINO" had been universally known to vendors and purchasers in fashion-related fields in Japan as the brand name of a famous Italian dress and accessory designer called 'Valentino Garavani'.

Y(The Italian luxury fashion house Valentino S.p.A. who was the Appellee) demanded a trial for invalidation of 'X's Trademark', on the grounds that it had been registered in violation of the trademark act of Japan (breach of Items (viii), (xi) and (xv) of Article 4(1) of the Trademark Act). In connection with demanding a trial for invalidation of the trademark (under these Items, Article 47 of the Trademark Act provided for an exclusion period to the effect that it was not possible to demand a trial decision for invalidation following the lapse of five years from the date of registration of the relevant trademark).

Whilst Y(The Italian luxury fashion house Valentino S.p.A.) had lodged its demand for a trial for invalidation immediately prior to the expiration of the exclusion period (the period before the appeal for invalidation the trade could be made), it was further stipulated (Article 56 of the Trademark Act, Article 131(1)(iii) of the Patent Act) that a demandant for a trial for invalidation was to state the gist of its claim and the grounds for its claim in the demand for a trial. In Y's demand, under the grounds for its claim Y had stated only that X's Trademark was invalid (in breach of Items (viii), (xi) and (xv) of Article 4(1) ), and it had made absolutely no reference to any specific facts or events that would attract the operation of the Items. Y was subsequently issued with an amendment order by the presiding judge at the Japan Patent Office, and it did add specific grounds for its claim by way of an amendment, it did so only after the lapse of the exclusion period. X argued that for a party to declare that it has complied with the exclusion period, it must tell the specific facts or events that would fall under the relevant Items within the exclusion period. Since no specific grounds for invalidation were claimed for this demand for a trial decision prior to the lapse of the exclusion period, the demand ought to be dismissed on procedural grounds.

In the trial decision the Patent Office (Trial Decision No. 20103 of 1996) ruled that if a demand for a trial for invalidation is submitted within an exclusion period and the particular statutory provisions providing the grounds for invalidation are specified in the demand, and if within the period ordered for an amendment the demand is supplemented with a detailed account and evidence, even if the date on which these amendments are submitted falls after the lapse of the exclusion period, the amendment of the demand for a trial for invalidation ought to be allowed. The Patent Office held that since the demand for the trial decision in this case was made within the exclusion period, it should not be dismissed on procedural grounds. On that basis the JPO ruled on the substance of the claim, and it issued a decision of invalidation on the grounds that X's Trademark was in breach of Article 4(1)(xv). In response X brought court proceedings for the revocation of this decision.

== The trial ==
The originating court (Tokyo High Court decision of 29 September 2003, Case No. 370 (Gke) of 2002) stated,"for a demandant for a trial for invalidation to declare that it has complied with the exclusion period, prior to the lapse of the exclusion period it is required to submit a demand that states the gist of, as well as the grounds for, the demandant's claims, specified in the form of one claim for each ground for invalidation." The Court then said that,"Y's demand for a trial only stated the relevant statutory provisions and made no claims of specific facts that constituted the grounds for invalidation and presented no evidence in support". The Court could not accept that at the time when the initial demand was submitted there had been established a demand for a trial for invalidation specified in the form of one claim, that was concerned on the grounds for invalidation under Items (viii) and (xi).

The Court therefore ruled that since the exclusion period had lapsed for a demand for a trial for invalidation (based on Items (viii) and (xi)), Y's demand on these grounds had no basis in law. With respect however to the ground for invalidation (under Item (xv)), taking account of factors including the fact that Y's name (Valentino Globe Besloten Vennootschap), which included the word "Valentino" had been stated in the initial demand; that "VALENTINO" was famous in the fashion industry in Japan; and that X too was found to have known of "VALENTIONO" since the statements in the initial demand can be regarded in the same light as those asserted by stating a ground for invalidation to the effect that X's Trademark was a trademark that was likely to cause confusion in connection with Y's markings including "VALENTINO" the Court found that as a result of the initial demand, it was possible to see that a demand for a trial decision for invalidation that was specified in the form of one claim had been established, and the Court ruled that the demand for a trial for invalidation based on the ground in Item (xv) was good in law since it complied with the exclusion period.

On that basis, the originating court endorsed the trial court's ruling to the effect that X's Trademark(which fell under Item (xv) of the trademark act), The court looked at all the facts and decided that X was wrong. It permanently rejected X’s application, and X can’t bring the same issue to court again (it dismissed X's application with prejudice on the merits). (*A similar kind of dispute had also arisen in addition between X and Y with respect to a trademark other than this trademark. The Tokyo High Court handed down its decision in that dispute on the same date as this decision: decision of the Tokyo High Court dated 29 September 2003 in Case No. 551 (Gke) of 2002; decision of the Tokyo High Court dated 29 September 2003 in Case No. 402 (Gke) of 2003.) In response, X petitioned for acceptance of a jokoku appeal. X argued at length in its petition, including that the hearing procedure lacked legality, that the Court erred in its finding concerning whether the "VALENTINO" mark was universally known and famous, and that the Court erred in its ruling on the likelihood of confusion as to origin under Item (xv). In ruling as follows, the Supreme Court decided to accept the petition only in respect of X's arguments concerning the exclusion period, and dismissed X's jokoku appeal with prejudice on the merits.

== Summary of decision ==
The court endorsed the conclusion of the JPO by the following reasons.

Article 47 prescribes that a demand for a trial for invalidation of a registered trademark on the grounds of breach of Item (xv) must be made within an exclusion period of five years from the date of registration of the trademark. Whilst a trademark registered in breach of Item (xv) ought to be invalidated in theory, the purpose of Article 47 is to be construed as placing the validity of the trademark's registration beyond challenge in order to protect the status quo in practice that arises as a result of the registration and that remains once the exclusion period expires without a demand being made for a trial for invalidation. The statutory purpose being such, it is therefore not the case that the registered trademark's validity is to be made final and binding early due to a strong requirement to protect the owner of the trademark, since such a trademark by rights ought not to have been registered in the first place. This can also be seen from the fact that the status quo will be undermined if a demand for a trial for invalidation of the registered trademark is made within the exclusion period and the demand for a trial contains a statement to the effect that the registered trademark in question is in breach of Item (xv) of Japan's trademark act.

Given that, for a party to declare that a demand for a trial for invalidation of a registered trademark on the grounds of breach of Item (xv) complies with the exclusion period, it is reasonable to take the view that it is sufficient if an assertion that the registered trademark is in breach of Item (xv) is stated in a demand for a trial that is submitted within the exclusion period as the grounds for the claim. It follows that there is no requirement to go so far as to include assertions on the specific facts and events that would fall under Item (xv).

Applying this to the present case, since it is clear from the facts stated above that the demand for a trial in this case was not submitted after the lapse of the exclusion period, no error was made in the trial decision concerning the interpretation and application of Article 47. This Court endorses the conclusion reached by the originating court in its decision described above to the effect that the demand for a trial in this case was not unfounded in law.
