= Sugimura & Partners =

Multinational intellectual property law firm

Sugimura & Partners 杉村萬国特許法律事務所
- Headquarters: Tokyo, Japan
- No. of offices: 2 (Tokyo and San Jose)
- No. of attorneys: 76 (Benrishi: 71, Bengoshi:3, European Patent Attorney:1, US Patent Attorney:1)
- No. of employees: about 200
- Major practice areas: Intellectual property
- Date founded: 1923
- Founder: Nobuchika Sugimura
- Website: sugimura.partners

Sugimura & Partners (杉村萬国特許法律事務所, Sugimura Bankoku Tokkyo Houritsu Jimusho) formerly known as Sugimura International Patent and Trademark Attorneys is an intellectual property law firm based in Japan. The firm has an international presence, representing clients from around the world. The firm represents more than 200 clients ranging from single inventors and start-ups to academic institutions and international corporations. Approximately half of Sugimura's client base consists of Japanese businesses and organizations, while the other half is foreign counterparts. It has a global legal network in over 40 countries.

== Overview ==
=== History ===
Sugimura was founded in 1923 by patent attorney and engineer Nobuchika Sugimura. The firm specializes in providing legal services in the acquisition, protection and consultation of Japanese IP rights, and is repeatedly ranked among the top Japanese patent and trademark firms. The company has offices in Japan and the United States, as well as professional relationships with associate law firms located in more than 80 countries. In 2017, the firm changed its name from Sugimura International Patent and Trademark Attorneys to Sugimura & Partners. Today, Kenji Sugimura. Principal Patent Attorney, and Koji Sugimura, Principal Attorney at Law are leading the firm.

=== Offices ===
It is headquartered in the Kasumigaseki Common Gate West Tower in Kasumigaseki, Chiyoda, Tokyo, Japan, and has a representative office in San Jose, California, U.S.A.

=== Recognition ===
Sugimura is ranked among the top Japanese law firms. The firm has been ranked on the World IP Survey, in the patent prosecution and trademark prosecution categories.

World Trademark Review recognizes the firm as a leading trademark professional in Japan. Intellectual Asset Management recognizes the firm as a leading patent professional in Japan.

Asian Legal Business recognizes the firm as a leading domestic patent firm.

== Notable representations ==
- Hidetsugu Yagi, Inventor of Yagi–Uda antenna
- Irène Joliot-Curie, Atomic Energy Generation Device Case
- Valentino Garavani, Rudolph Valentino Case
