= Atomic Energy Generation Device Case =

SCOJ 92 (Gyo-Tsu) of 1964
- Court: Supreme Court of Japan
- Full case name: Atomic Energy Generation Device Case
- Decided: January 28, 1969

The Atomic Energy Generation Device Case (原子力エネルギー発生装置事件) is a 1969 decision of the Supreme Court of Japan concerning the patentability of a method of transformation of atomic nuclei. All members of the patent family had been granted in other countries, and the Japan Patent Office (JPO) did not find any prior art which could destroy the novelty and inventive step of claimed inventions. However, the JPO rejected the patent application as being lack of industrial safety requirements. This is the first Japanese Supreme Court case concerning patentable subject matter.

== Background ==
In 1940, the Commissariat à l'énergie atomique of France filed a patent application in Japan for an "Atomic Energy Generation Device". The application claimed a priority under the Paris Convention from a French patent application filed on 1 May 1939. The case was represented by Nobuchika Sugimura of Sugimura International Patent and Trademark Attorneys from the filing stage throughout the Supreme Court.

The application was invalidated during World War II, but was subsequently restored pursuant to the Order Concerning Post-War Measures for the Industrial property rights of Allied Nationals 1 Article 7, Paragraph 1, Item 2. The JPO rejected the application on the ground that the invention was incomplete. The applicant then filed an interlocutory appeal in the JPO. However, the appeal was dismissed on the basis that the invention failed to meet threshold requirements in that it “could not be used in accordance with industrial safety requirements”.

Consequently, the applicant filed a lawsuit against the Commissioner of the JPO in the Tokyo High Court seeking to have the appeal decision set aside. The suit was consequently dismissed on the grounds that: where practical measures to prevent risks and ensure safety have not been clarified, an invention does not fulfill the threshold requirement that the industrial sector should be able to use the invention with the assurance of safety; it is not sufficient for an industrial invention to be complete in technical terms. The applicant lodged a jokoku appeal.

Incidentally, the inventor of this patent application was Irène Joliot-Curie who was the eldest daughter of Madame Curie, and Irene, a party not involved in this suit, was the recipient, along with two other individuals, of a 1935 Nobel Prize in Chemistry. The invention, which incorporated the fundamental principles of the atomic reactor, was famous worldwide as the first patented “Atomic Reactor.” The right to apply for a patent for this invention had been transferred to the nation of France.

== Summary of decision ==
The appeal was dismissed by the following reasons.

(i) “From the description in the specifications, the invention aims to create an energy generation device that uses energy produced through the fission of natural uranium (chain nuclear fission), which when effectively bombarded with neutrons for industrial purposes, does not cause an explosion. It follows from the nature of the device that, unlike a simple tool used in a scientific experiment, the device must obviously be technically and functionally complete at least to the point where the energy can be extracted predictably and safely. It is therefore necessary that, in addition to the practical means for causing chain nuclear fission through neutron bombardment and keeping the same appropriately under control, the technical detail of the device should contain plans for practical methods sufficient to suppress the significant risks that are inevitably inherent when conducting chain nuclear fission.

(ii) It is asserted that the predictable and safe operation of an invention is not a threshold condition for the technical completion of an invention. It is also asserted that it is sufficient, for the technical effect of the invention to be industrial in nature, for the invention to come within the term “industrial invention” in Article 1 of the old Patent Law (Law No. 96 of 1921). Such argument, however, ignores the fact that the aim of the invention is to safely control the chain nuclear fission that it causes. Since it is difficult to utilize the invention in a predictable and safe manner, and is thus technically incomplete, it has not reached the point where it is industrially and technically effective as an energy generation device.

(iii) In terms of the patent application process, the entire technical details of this kind of invention should be…disclosed within the description contained in the specification. That statement is then subjected to examination. Whether the invention is complete or not is to be determined by referring to the statements in the description that are contained in the specification. It therefore follows that, if the technical details of the invention are not sufficiently specific and objective in these statements, and a person having ordinary skill in the art to which the invention pertains could not easily reproduce the same, the substance of the invention is technically incomplete and it does not constitute an “invention”.

(iv) The risks inherent in the utilization of this invention are unique in kind, cannot be prevented by the normal methods used in ordinary power devices, and moreover, are inevitable if the effect and function of the device are to be achieved. It therefore follows that the practical means to prevent the said risks should be part of the technical substance of the invention."
