= Kenji Sugimura =

Japanese architect and patent attorney (born 1953)

- Born: 4 September 1953 (age 72); Tokyo, Japan
- Occupation: Architect
- Awards: G-Mark Award from the Japan Industrial Design Promotion Organization; Ecomark Award from the Japan Environment Association
- Practice: Sugimura & Partners
- Buildings: YKK Manufacturing and Engineering Centre; Setagaya Literary Museum
- Projects: HSBC Building (Hong Kong)

Kenji Sugimura (杉村 憲司, Sugimura Kenji; born 4 September 1953) is a Japanese architect and patent attorney. He is Principal Patent Attorney of Sugimura & Partners.

== Early life ==
Sugimura was born in Tokyo, in 1953 as a grandson of Nobuchika Sugimura, the founder of Sugimura International Patent and Trademark Attorneys. He went to Musashi High School and Waseda University, where he majored in architecture.

== Career ==
=== Architect ===
Sugimura is a registered architect in Japan and the U.K. He was employed in the architectural firm of Norman Foster in London from 1978 to 1983, and was a representative in Hong Kong from 1983 to 1986. He was involved in the construction of the Hong Kong and Shanghai Bank Headquarters in Hong Kong.

Then he founded, with his partner Roy Fleetwood, the architectural firm Sugimura Fleetwood Architects and Engineers in Tokyo in 1988.

=== Patent attorney ===
After a 25-year career as an architect, Sugimura became a patent attorney. In 2006, he succeeded to the family business and took over the presidency of Sugimura International Patent and Trademark Attorneys. He is involved in IP organizations, such as AIPPI, APAA, FICPI, INTA, and the JPAA. He serves as a member of the board of FICPI-Japan and on JPAA's International Activities Center subcommittee. He has authored several articles on Japanese IP practice in international IP magazines. His writings focus on new changes and trends in Japanese IP practice, general differences between Japanese IP practice and IP practices in the US and Europe, and industry specific opportunities within the Japanese IP market. He was elected as a vice president of JPAA in 2020.

== Main works ==
- YKK Manufacturing and Engineering Centre (1992)
- Setagaya Literary Museum (1995)

== Awards ==
- G-Mark Award from the Japan Industrial Design Promotion Organization (YKK Manufacturing and Engineering Centre)
- Ecomark Award from the Japan Environment Association (YKK Manufacturing and Engineering Centre)

== Publications ==
- N. Foster, K. Sugimura, "Foster Associates, the architecture of the near future". Space Design: 5–68. March 1982.
- Kenji Sugimura, "未来技術への滑走 ノーマン・フォスターと建築のハイ・テクノロジー". A+U: Architecture and Urbanism: 37–46. October 1983.
- Kenji Sugimura, "建築は技術のゆえにより高く翔くか". Space Design: 8–10. January 1985.
- N. Foster, D. Sudjic, T. Fitzpatrick, M. Glover, C. Seddon, K. Sugimura, J. Zunz, "Foster Associates: Hong Kong Bank". A+U: Architecture and Urbanism: 19–150. June 1986.
- N. Foster, T. Nakamura, C. Abel, C. Seddon, K. Sugimura, "Norman Foster, 1964-1987". A+U: Extra Edition: 1–309. May 1988.
- Kenji Sugimura, "大スパンを覆う照明システム エルコ社の照明器具AXISとGANTRY". Space Design: 29–36. October 1988.
- Kenji Sugimura, "Norman Foster". 新建築: 271–272. June 1991.
- Kenji Sugimura et al., "香港上海銀行におけるかたちの決め方 : 「メーカーまでおりていく」デザイン手法について". Journal of Architecture and Building Science: 38–39. April 1994.
- Kenji Sugimura, "Japan's New Patent Rules". Managing Intellectual Property. February 2010.
- Kenji Sugimura, Takahiro Yamazaki, "Effective Ways to Obtain Japanese Patents". World Intellectual Property Review. September 2011.
- Kenji Sugimura, Rebecca Chen, "An Important Market: Software Patenting in Japan". World Intellectual Property Review. September 2012.
- Kenji Sugimura, Rebecca Chen, "iPS Cell Technology Spurs Biological Patenting in Japan". World Intellectual Property Review. 2013.
- Kenji Sugimura, Rebecca Chen, "Border enforcement in Japan: a swift alternative to litigation". World Intellectual Property Review. 2014.
