= Japan Patent Attorneys Association =

Bar association

- Formation: 1915
- Type: Professional Association
- Headquarters: Chiyoda-ku, Tokyo
- Location: Japan
- President: Shimizu Yoshihiro
- Website: http://www.jpaa.or.jp

The Japan Patent Attorneys Association (日本弁理士会, Nihon Benrishi Kai) (JPAA), headquartered in Tokyo, Japan, is the only one national, professional bar association of Japanese patent attorneys (Benrishi) with approximately 10,000 members.

== History ==
The Japanese Patent Attorney System was established on July 1, 1899, fourteen years after the Patent Law System was organized by Korekiyo Takahashi in 1885. In 1899, the number of registered Patent Attorneys was 138. Since then, the number of Patent Attorneys has increased gradually and, in 2012, reached 9300.

The organization for Patent Attorneys, namely the Japan Patent Attorneys Association (JPAA), was founded in 1915. Since its founding, the JPAA has played an important role in improving Japan's industrial property rights system. The JPAA has also been a leader in promoting better understanding of various issues relating to intellectual property (IP). For example, the JPAA has hosted a number of seminars and lectures focusing on IP issues on such wide-ranging topics as international treaties, domestic and international laws and new and advanced technologies.

Nobuchika Sugimura was the first chairman of the JPAA.

== Qualification ==
Ordinarily, to become a Patent Attorney, one must pass the examination given annually by the Japan Patent Office. The examination consists of a three-step screening method: first a multiple-choice examination, then an essay writing examination, and finally an oral examination. The examination consists of several mandatory subjects such as industrial property laws and treaties as well as optional subjects such as communication engineering, organic chemistry, and other natural sciences.

== Registration ==
A person who has passed the examination or who holds another national qualification for becoming a Patent Attorney must register himself or herself with the JPAA to practice as a Patent Attorney. In other words, all Patent Attorneys are required by law to register with the JPAA. The JPAA oversees and regulates the activities of its members, for example by requiring each JPAA member to abide by the code of ethics (which is prescribed by the law) that sets the standard regulating the members' conduct.

== Organization ==
The president of JPAA is responsible for all matters relating to internal and external affairs of the JPAA. There are eight JPAA vice-presidents who help and support the president. The president and vice-presidents form a Board of Executive Directors that decides on and executes the budget and main projects of the JPAA. In addition to the Board of Executive Directors, the JPAA has a couple of other boards, such as the Audit Board and the Board of Council Members. The JPAA also has five affiliated organizations, such as the International Activities Center and the Education Institute. The JPAA has about forty committees, such as the Patent Committee and the Trademark Committee.

In April 2006 the organization of the JPAA will be changed. That is, up to 20 council members will be added to the board of directors and the term of the president will be extended to two years starting from April 2007. The secretariat and his/her staff assist the board of executives in all matters. Currently the Board of Council Members consists of 40 persons elected by JPAA members. This number will increase to 60 in April 2006. The JPAA has a general assembly that is the highest decision making assembly, consisting of all Patent Attorneys.

== Professional services ==
The Patent Attorney represents both Japanese and foreign clients in the procedures of patent, utility model, design, and trademark applications before the Japan Patent Office. No person except a Patent Attorney or Attorney at Law is permitted to represent clients before the Patent Office in exchange for remuneration. Other than representation before the Patent Office, the Patent Attorney can represent clients in connection with matters related to unfair competition law and the procedures associated with arbitration or settlement regarding IP issues, importation of infringing articles, and IP licensing.

The Patent Attorney can represent clients in an administrative proceeding in appealing the Patent Office's decision before the Intellectual Property High Court. The Patent Attorney can appear, present a statement and/or perform an interrogation in court in order to assist a party and its Attorney at Law in connection with matters involving patent, utility model, design, and trademark affairs. The Patent Attorney can prepare expert opinions with respect to patent, utility model, design, and trademark.

A Patent Attorney who has passed a special examination after taking 45 hours of courses on IP litigation can represent clients in infringement lawsuits along with an Attorney at Law.

== Activities ==
=== Education ===
The JPAA started its educational activities in 1962 and established the Training Institute in 1978. The Training Institute offers a number of training and continuing education courses and programs for new and experienced JPAA members. The training program for new members is divided into two parts, one in spring and the other in autumn, each part consisting of about 20 courses of intensive study covering many topics ranging from patent application procedures and studies of judicial cases to international application procedures. The focus of the training for experienced members is primarily on the substantive patent and trademark laws, as well as PCT, EPC, and U.S. patent procedures and the patent procedures of other countries. It also includes litigation, copyright, unfair competition laws, and a number of other areas in which the role of patent attorneys is expected to expand. JPAA has recently introduced an e-learning system, offering its educational programs to its members via the Internet.

=== International ===
The JPAA is very active internationally. The JPAA hosts regular meetings with the KPAA, the ACPAA, and the AIPLA in order to promote better mutual understanding among respective groups about various IP systems. The JPAA has also had meetings and other exchanges with the CIPA and other patent attorney associations. The JPAA regularly sends its delegates to WIPO sessions to participate in discussions concerning international IP systems. The JPAA has made significant contributions to APIC training courses, which are organized by the Japan Institute of Invention and Innovation and sponsored by the Japan Patent Office. The JPAA regularly sends lecturers for programs provided by the APIC, and the APIC training courses have been attended by more than 1,000 trainees from the APEC and other countries since 1996. JPAA regularly makes available in English such information as revisions of the Japanese IP laws and changes in practice before the Japan Patent Office. Information such as revisions of intellectual property laws and practice, treaties, and Patent Office and court decision in foreign countries is provided in Japanese to JPAA members.

=== Research ===
The JPAA has a research arm – the IP Research Institute – where researchers study and research a wide variety of matters relating to industrial property. The researchers at the Institute include not only patent attorneys but also scholars. In addition, various committees of the JPAA are studying and researching specific topics. Committees include the Patent Committee, Design Committee, Trademark Committee, Computer Software Committee, and Biotechnology Committee. The findings by these committees are published in the magazine "PATENT" and made available to the public.

=== Support and assistance ===
JPAA also runs the IP Assistance and Support Center for the purposes of enlightening and popularizing the IP system by educating the general public about the roles of the IP system in our society. The Patent Attorneys who volunteer their time and resources help give lectures at schools and organize meetings where people can consult about IP issues. The JPAA assists with invention contests and provides financial assistance to small businesses.

=== Arbitration Center ===
JPAA organizes and operates the Arbitration Center for IP rights under joint control with the Japan Federation of Bar Associations. The Arbitration Center is an extrajudicial organization that can resolve disputes very quickly (basically within three months) and privately (in closed sessions, out of court). The arbitrators are selected from Patent Attorneys and Attorneys at Law. The judgment of the arbitrator(s) will constitute the final judgment and no appeal to the court can be made. Arbitration has an advantage over judicial proceeding in that the expenses for arbitration are likely to be considerably less.

=== Public relations ===
JPAA publishes the monthly magazine "PATENT" and the monthly newsletter "JPAA Journal". In addition to these periodical publications, JPAA makes available a guidebook and/or a brochure for people who are not familiar with the IP system and the roles of Patent Attorneys. JPAA has its own web site (http://www.jpaa.or.jp/), which makes available information about the activities of JPAA, topics about the industrial property system, revisions of related laws, judicial precedents, and so forth. JPAA holds monthly meetings with people from the news media and cooperates with broadcast media by providing them with information relating to IP issues and other related topics.
