= Setagaya Literary Museum =

Museum in Tokyo, Japan

Coordinates: 35°40′1.4″N 139°36′32.1″E

- 世田谷文学館
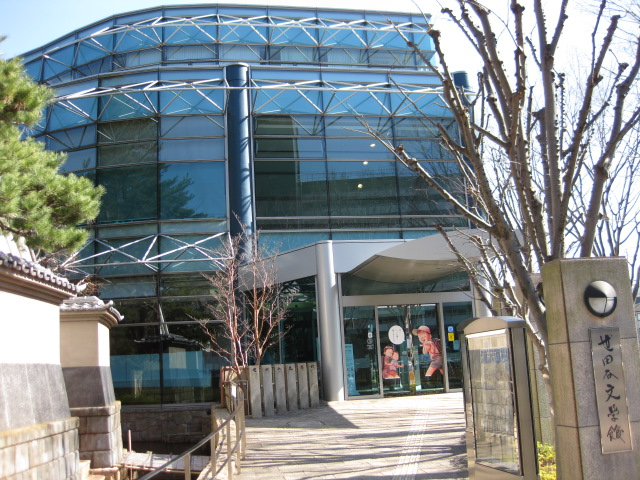
- Established: 1995
- Location: 1-10-10, Minami Karasuyama, Setagaya, Tokyo, Japan 157-0062
- Director: Akimasa Kanno
- Owner: Setagaya Bunka Zaidan
- Public transit access: Roka-kōen Station, Keiō Line
- Parking: On site
- Website: www.setabun.or.jp (in Japanese)

The Setagaya Literary Museum (世田谷文学館, Setagaya Bungakukan) is an art museum in Minami-Karasuyama, Setagaya, Tokyo. It is owned by Setagaya City and operated by Setagaya Cultural Foundation (Setagaya Bunka Zaidan). The museum was founded in April 1995 as a comprehensive museum of modern literature originated from Setagaya. It also functions as a library, as well as museum and archives.

The building was designed by Kenji Sugimura and has three stories. The first floor consists of exhibition rooms and a library that houses about 80,000 collections. The second floor has a larger exhibition space and a conference room. Its construction area is 1,527.08 square meters and the total floor area is 4,593.92 square meters.

In the museum, there are over 90,000 works including materials, such as letters and manuscripts. Besides permanent exhibitions, they have also temporary exhibitions which are changed regularly. Materials and literary works of writers with ties to Setagaya City are available to the public.
