= Benrishi =

Japanese legal profession

Benrishi (弁理士) is a Japanese legal profession specifically licensed to practice intellectual property law. Most benrishi specialize in patent law, but are also allowed to practice in copyright, trademark, unfair competition and trade secret law.

While benrishi are often referred to as "patent attorneys" in English, their qualifications differ from patent attorneys in the United States and Germany in some aspects. Benrishi are not necessarily required to possess legal educations. Benrishi also have greater authority than patent specialists in other countries, as they are allowed to represent clients in administrative proceedings and out-of-court bargaining related to IP rights.

The benrishi examination (弁理士試験 benrishi-shiken) covers a broad range of intellectual property law (patent, utility model, design, trademark, treaties, copyright and unfair competition law) and limited fields of law and science. The benrishi examination consisted of three stages. The first stage is the multiple choice exam, the second stage is the essay exam, and the final stage is the oral exam.

As of 2012, 9,300 benrishi are practicing in Japan, approximately as many per capita as in the United States. Entrance to the profession is regulated by a low pass rate (about 7% as of 2008; it was less than 3% until about 1997) on the benrishi examination only. The Japan Patent Office and government officials have expressed an interest in attracting more individuals to the profession as part of a broader series of reforms in Japan's legal professions.

Different from a U.S. patent agent, a benrishi is qualified to prosecute trademark applications, assist clients in copyright and licensing matters, and to represent clients in some court proceedings and custom seizure matters.

== History ==
The benrishi profession was adopted from German patent law, which Japan duplicated during the Meiji era. The Benrishi Law (弁理士法 benrishi-hō) was passed in 1921 and remained almost unchanged through the end of the 20th century.

In 2001, after a decade of economic stagnation, the Benrishi Law was changed, and the role of the benrishi in the patent system was changed significantly. Benrishi were allowed to represent clients in adversarial proceedings before customs courts and in arbitration. The law was revised again in 2002 to allow benrishi to represent clients in courtroom litigation, either independently of or in cooperation with attorneys. Benrishi has been qualified to be a legal representative for appealing to the Intellectual Property High Court (the exclusive jurisdiction) representing the client against the adverse decision of Trial Board (consisting of three administrative trial judges) of Japan Patent Office, and even up to the Supreme Court (The Benrishi Law Article 6). Benrishi can also represent the infringement cases if it meets the criteria (The Benrishi Law Article 6bis).

== Business ==
The main duties of a Benrishi are as follows.

- Representation to the Patent Office about patents, designs, trademarks, etc.
- Representation of arbitration cases about intellectual property rights
- Representation of negotiating and entering into contracts about patent and copyrighted rights, confidential technical sales contracts and licenses
- Counsel for litigation under the Patent Law, etc.

== Qualification regimes ==
A person qualified to be a Benrishi is:

- a person who has passed the Japanese patent attorney examination;
- a person qualified to become a lawyer
- a person who has been engaged in the affairs of examination or trial as an examiner or trial examiner of the Patent Office for a total of 7 years or more

(Article 7 of the Act).

However, a person qualified to become a BENRISHI needs to register as a patent attorney with the Japan Patent Attorneys Association (Article 17 of the Act).

== The benrishi examination ==
=== Test Contents ===
The purpose of the patent attorney examination is to determine whether a person who intends to become a patent attorney has the necessary knowledge and applied skills to become a patent attorney. Those who have passed the patent attorney examination and completed practical training are qualified to become patent attorneys.

The patent attorney examination consists of a written examination and an oral examination, and only those who have passed the written examination may take the oral examination. The written examination consists of a mark-sheet examination and essay-based examination, and only those who have passed the mark-sheet examination may take the essay-based examination.

=== Mark-sheet examination ===
The following examination subjects are given in a short-answer (multiple-choice) format.

- Patent Law and Utility Model Law
- Design Law
- Trademark Law
- Industrial property treaties (Paris Convention, Patent Cooperation Treaty, etc.)
- Copyright Law and Unfair Competition Prevention Law

=== Essay-based examination ===
Only those who have passed the mark-sheet examination may take the essay-based examination. The examination is given in the form of a paper, and the required subjects are laws and regulations concerning industrial property rights (Patent Law, Utility Model Law, Design Law, and Trademark Law), and the following elective subjects.

1. Science and Engineering I (Mechanics) Mechanics of materials, Fluid Mechanics, Thermodynamics, Soil Engineering
2. Science and Engineering II (Mathematics and Physics) physics, electromagnetism, circuit theory
3. Science and Engineering III (Chemistry) Physical chemistry, organic chemistry, inorganic chemistry
4. Science and Engineering IV (Biology) General biology, biochemistry
5. Science and Engineering V (Information) Information theory, computer engineering
6. Law (Laws relating to the practice of patent attorneys) Civil law

=== Oral examination ===
This examination is taken by those who have passed the written paper examination. The examination will cover laws and regulations related to industrial property rights.

=== Difficulty level ===
The trend of the passing rate is as follows.

Trends in Patent Attorney Examination Pass Rates
	2008	2009	2010	2011	2012	2013	2014	2015	2016	2017
Number of Applicants	10,494	10,384	9,950	8,735	7,930	7,528	6,216	5,340	4,679	4,352
Number of Test Takers	9,727	9,517	9,152	7,948	7,231	6,784	5,599	4,798	4,211	3,912
Number of Passer of Mark-sheet Examination	2,865	1,420	899	1,934	1,374	434	550	604	557	287
Number of Passer of Essay-based examination	601	944	822	715	837	490	358	248	288	229
Number of Final Passers	574	813	756	721	773	715	385	319	296	255
Passing Rate	5.9%	8.5%	8.3%	9.1%	10.7%	10.5%	6.9%	6.6%	7.0%	6.5%

Composition of Successful Candidates in the Patent Attorney Examination by Gender
	2008	2009	2010	2011	2012	2013	2014	2015	2016	2017
Male	83.1%	83.6%	80.3%	83.5%	79.8%	80.4%	76.9%	79.6%	80.7%	72.9%
Female	16.9%	16.4%	19.7%	16.5%	20.2%	19.6%	23.1%	20.4%	19.3%	27.1%

Composition of Successful Candidates in the Patent Attorney Examination by School Background or Major
	2008	2009	2010	2011	2012	2013	2014	2015	2016	2017
Science and Engineering Background	87.3%	86.5%	83.1%	82.8%	84.6%	85.0%	82.9%	82.4%	86.5%	78.8%
Law and Humanities Background	10.1%	10.3%	13.5%	13.9%	12.3%	11.3%	14.5%	13.5%	10.1%	15.7%
Other	-	-	-	-	3.1%	3.6%	2.6%	4.1%	3.4%	5.5%

Breakdown of Successful Candidates in the Patent Attorney Examination by School of Origin (Number in parentheses indicates the number of successful candidates)
2003	University of Tokyo (52)	Kyoto University (44)	Tokyo Institute of Technology (37)	Waseda University (37)	Osaka University (32)
2004	Kyoto University (51)	University of Tokyo (47)	Waseda University (47)	Tokyo Institute of Technology (36)	Osaka University (30)
2005	University of Tokyo (73)	Kyoto University (62)	Tokyo Institute of Technology (47)	Osaka University (42)	Waseda University (38)
2006	Kyoto University (59)	University of Tokyo (57)	Osaka University (44)	Waseda University (41)	Tokyo Institute of Technology (38)
2007	Kyoto University (54)	University of Tokyo (53)	Osaka University (50)	Waseda University (37)	Tokyo Institute of Technology (25)
2008	University of Tokyo (61)	Osaka University (42)	Kyoto University (41)	Waseda University (39)	Tokyo Institute of Technology (33)
2009	University of Tokyo (75)	Kyoto University (67)	Osaka University (45)	Tokyo Institute of Technology (42)	Waseda University (39)
2010	University of Tokyo (65)	Kyoto University (55)	Waseda University (42)	Osaka University (37)	Tokyo Institute of Technology (36)
2011	University of Tokyo (69)	Kyoto University (55)	Tokyo Institute of Technology (40)	Waseda University (36)	Keio University (34)
2012	University of Tokyo (70)	Kyoto University (55)	Tokyo Institute of Technology (48)	Osaka University (48)	Waseda University (39)
2013	University of Tokyo (65)	Kyoto University (51)	Osaka University (38)	Tokyo Institute of Technology (35)	Waseda University (28)
2014	Kyoto University (27)	University of Tokyo (26)	Waseda University (25)	Osaka University (19)	Tokyo Institute of Technology (17)
2015	Kyoto University (32)	University of Tokyo (25)	Osaka University (20)	Keio University (13)	Waseda University (12)
2016	University of Tokyo (36)	Kyoto University (27)	Tohoku University (15)	Tokyo Institute of Technology (13)	Tokyo University of Science (13)
2017	University of Tokyo (37)	Kyoto University (29)	Tohoku University (16)	Tokyo Institute of Technology (15)	Tokyo University of Science (12)
2018	University of Tokyo (36)	Kyoto University (29)	Osaka University (16)	Keio University (11)	Hokkaido University (11)
2019	Kyoto University (30)	University of Tokyo (25)	Tokyo Institute of Technology (19)	Osaka University (18)	Keio University (16)

== See also ==
- Bengoshi
