= Japan Intellectual Property Association =

The Japan Intellectual Property Association (JIPA) is a non-profit, non-governmental organization representing "industries and users of the intellectual property (IP) system". It was established in 1938. It claims to be the largest private organization in Japan concerned with intellectual property rights, with more than one thousand members as of 2009.

== See also ==
- Japanese patent law
- Japan Patent Office
