= YKK Manufacturing and Engineering Centre =

Manufacturing plant and R&D center in Japan

YKK Manufacturing and Engineering Centre is a manufacturing plant and a R&D center of YKK AP which is a subsidiary company of YKK Group. It is located in Namerikawa, Toyama (situated between the Japanese Alps and Toyoma Bay), and was opened on October 22, 1992. Main products developed and manufactured there include architectural products such as a curtain wall for high-rise buildings, glass exteriors, steel products and entrances, as well as residential products such as windows, screen doors, interior building materials and aluminum exterior material. The center also functions as a sales and logistics base in Hokuriku region.

Architects Roy Fleetwood and Kenji Sugimura produced a design of the building that brings the theme of “people and technology“ to the fore, developing a harmony between the two. The dominant materials of the building are steel and glass. The entrance area is delineated by a 45-metre-wide steel structure supporting a glass roof. This area was based on the idea of an “open-air workshop”. The interior space features an open design that facilitates communications among staff while lending Optimum organization to the working space. All structural and technical details are visible. The double-glazed exterior walls allow natural light to pour in, and also give unlimited views of the attractive surrounding area. The complex has the character of a showroom through the use of YKK products and the presence of numerous presentation and demonstration areas. The buildings technological image is based on the company itself, its products and its philosophy.

The building won G-Mark Award from the Japan Industrial Design Promotion Organization and iF Ecology Design Award.
