= Yoko Sugimura =

Yoko Sugimura (杉村陽子)
- Born: November 1, 1974 (age 51)
- Origin: Nagano Prefecture, Japan
- Occupations: Model, race queen in Japan)

Yoko Sugimura (Japanese: 杉村 陽子 Sugimura Yoko, born November 1, 1974, in Nagano, Japan) is a former Japanese gravure idol and race queen.

Yoko Sugimura began her modeling career as a race queen for Kure in 1997, where she teamed up with Fumika Suzuki. As with Fumika Suzuki, the race queen modeling gave her career a good start. In 1997 she also was Toyota's event girl at the Tokyo Motor Show. In 1998 she appeared as a K-1 round girl, at the Tokyo Auto Salon as an event girl for Toyota, and in CMs for Takefuji. She also continued her race queen work, for the Piknik team in Formula Nippon, and was also featured in internet events in Akihabara. In 1999 she released an idol video and photobook, and was once again Toyota's event girl at the Tokyo Motor show.

Unlike Fumika Suzuki, who retired as a race queen in 1998, Yoko kept on as a race queen from year 2000 and onwards. For example, in 2000 she was the Regain race queen and in 2001 she promoted Weds Sport.

She continued to be very active during the 2000s, appearing at many electronic events, and also continuing her race queen (this time for Honda) and auto show work, for companies such as KDDI, Daihatsu, Mitsubishi, APEXi and Toyota.

According to one of her fan sites, Yoko Sugimura retired in late 2006, after nine years as a model.
