= Videogram =

Pseudonym of Swedish musician Magnus Sellergren

- Born: Magnus Jan Michael Sellergren
- Origin: Sweden
- Genres: Horror synth; Space disco; Darkwave
- Years active: 2014–present
- Label: SelectaVision
- Website: videogramswe.blogspot.com

Magnus Jan Michael Sellergren, known professionally as Videogram, is a Swedish composer and producer. The originator of the VHS-inspired horror synth sound, the project debuted with the "Charles Bronson" digital single and S/T album in 2014, coinciding with Doc Terror's Italian Horror Week.

Drawing inspiration from various movie genres of the 1980s, Videogram's musical style attempts to capture the era's atmosphere, emulating and celebrating both the electronic music scores of science fiction, action, and horror films as well as the VHS format. Since 2014 the project has received coverage from the international horror community and other pop culture media. Videogram has appeared in interviews with and been featured in The A.V. Club, Bloody Disgusting, Cinema Retro, Lunchmeat VHS, Rue Morgue, Starburst, and Uncovering Stranger Things: Essays on Eighties Nostalgia, Cynicism and Innocence in the Series by author Kevin J. Wetmore Jr.

In 2017 Videogram's music appeared on the Rue Morgue compilation They Came From Rue Morgue and Vestra Pictures documentaries VHS Lives: A Schlockumentary and VHS Lives 2: Undead Format. In 2018 Videogram's "Choice Cuts 2014 - 2018" compilation album and Acid Washed "Voorhees Stomp" remix single was featured in online and mobile platform digital distributor Groupees horror and thriller-themed "The Darkening" bundle that included games by Akupara Games, among others.

== Musical Influences ==
In interviews Magnus Sellergren has stated that Videogram's musical influences include John Carpenter, Fabio Frizzi, Giorgio Moroder, Ennio Morricone, and The Giallos Flame.

== Collaborations ==
Since the project's inception, Videogram has been having an ongoing collaboration with Australian multiinstrumentalist The Jimmy C, with the Australian musician providing drums and percussion for several tracks on a majority of Videogram's releases. Since 2016, Videogram has collaborated with Record Makers duo Acid Washed, whose previous efforts include Moby, Jimmy Somerville, and Wolfmother.

== Discography ==
=== Albums ===
- Videogram digital (2014), self-released
- Pre-Cert LP/CD/digital (2015), Cineploit
- Videogram Redux digital (2017), SelectaVision
- Choice Cuts 2014 - 2018 CD/digital (2018), SelectaVision

=== Singles and EPs ===
- Charles Bronson digital (2014), self-released
- Camp Blood digital (2014), self-released
- 2077: Raiders of the Apocalypse lathe-cut 7"/digital (2014), self-released
- Cobretti EP digital (2015), self-released
- Outpost 31 Isn't Responding digital (2015), self-released
- Camp Blood EP 10"/digital (2015), Cineploit
- Camp Blood EP cassette (2016), self-released
- Gladiatori dell'Apocalisse 12"/digital (2016), Cineploit
- Gladiatori dell'Apocalisse cassette (2016), self-released
- Halloween digital (2016), self-released
- Test Subject 011 digital (2017), SelectaVision
- Test Subject 011 7" (2018), SelectaVision
- Voorhees Stomp (Acid Washed Remix) digital (2018), self-released
- Outpost 31 Isn't Responding cassette/digital (2018), SelectaVision
- Michael digital (2018), self-released
- Gladiatori dell'Apocalisse (edit) digital (2018), self-released
- VHS Lives! Music From the Vestra Pictures Documentary digital (2019), self-released
- Papaya digital (2019), self-released

=== Compilations ===
- Pumpkin Guts Vol: 2 digital (2014), Graveyard Calling Records
- Stereo Sonic Electro Rockin digital (2016), Synthetix.FM
- Omaggio al Maestro Ennio Morricone LP/CD (2017), Cineploit
- They Came From Rue Morgue digital (2017), Rue Morgue magazine
- Music For the Murdered digital (2017), Brutal Resonance
- Another Year Not Dead digital (2018), Brutal Resonance

=== Other releases ===
- Videogram VHS cassette (2015), Lunchmeat VHS

== Awards and nominations ==
- "Pre-Cert" LP/CD made part of Code 7 Distribution's 'Best Albums of 2015' series.
- "Test Subject 011" was selected as 7-inch "Vinyl of the Month" by Performer Magazine in April 2018.

== Filmography ==
- VHS Lives: A Schlockumentary (2017), Vestra Pictures
- VHS Lives 2: Undead Format (2017), Vestra Pictures

== Other ==
Sellergren is the initiator of the annual grassroots celebration Texas Chain Saw Massacre Day that takes place on August 18.
