= Roy Fleetwood =

British architect and designer

Roy Fleetwood (born 1946 in London) is a British architect and designer. He is director of the Office for Design Strategy in Cambridge, England.

== Life ==
From 1965 to 1971, Fleetwood studied Architecture in Liverpool and a scholarship in Rome. He was a partner in the architectural firm of Norman Foster in London from 1973 to 1983, and was a representative in Hong Kong from 1983 to 1986. His responsibility was the construction of the Hong Kong and Shanghai Bank in Hong Kong, the Sainsbury Centre for Visual Arts in Norwich and the Renault Centre in Swindon. Fleetwood has worked worldwide with companies such as Bulthaup, ERCO, Vitra and Hitachi among others and made his name as a product designer. He received a variety of design awards.

Fleetwood founded the "Office for Design Strategy" in Cambridge in 1986 and, with his partner Kenji Sugimura, the architectural firm Sugimura Fleetwood Architects and Engineers in Tokyo in 1988. Since 2004 he is also a professor and holds a chair of design at the Victoria University of Wellington (VIC) in Wellington, New Zealand. He is a visiting professor at universities in Europe, USA and Japan. In 2007 he was a member of the jury of the red dot design award: product design.

== Awards ==
- Design Zentrum Nordrhein Westfalen
- Industrie Forum Hannover, including iF awards for design and innovation
- iF Ecology Design Award for the solar-powered lighting (for YKK Manufacturing and Engineering Centre, Namerikawa, Japan)
- Minerva Award from the Chartered Society of Designers in England (for Erco, Germany)
- Federal Product Design Award of the German Federal Ministry of Economics (for Erco, Germany)
- G-Mark Award from the Japan Industrial Design Promotion Organization (for YKK Manufacturing and Engineering Centre, Japan)
- Ecomark Award from the Japan Environment Association (for YKK Manufacturing and Engineering Centre, Japan)
