= Lunchmeat VHS =

- Lunchmeat VHS, Issue 2
- Editor: Josh Schafer
- Categories: Horror
- Frequency: Sporadic
- First issue: August 2008
- Country: United States
- Based in: Elmer, New Jersey
- Website: http://www.lunchmeatvhs.com/

Lunchmeat VHS Fanzine is a magazine dedicated to the preservation of horror and exploitation films on the VHS format. It is published occasionally and is edited by Josh Schafer. It has been in publication since August 2008.

== Content ==
Lunchmeat VHS contains interviews with actors of niche genre films, painters of VHS cover art, directors of obscure gems, and even proprietors of long-standing VHS rental stores. Lunchmeat VHS also reviews music from horror films (on vinyl), and produces genre-themed crossword puzzles as well as cartoons.

=== Contributors ===
Some of the regular writers include John DeSantis, Heather Drain, Rob Hauschild, Louis Justin, David J. Moore, and Josh Schafer.
