= Nobuchika Sugimura =

Japanese inventor and patent attorney

- 杉村 信近
- Born: 1881; Japan
- Died: April 15, 1973 (aged 91–92); Japan
- Education: University of Tokyo
- Occupations: Patent attorney; Mechanical engineer; Inventor
- Known for: First chairman of the Japan Patent Attorneys Association; Founder of Sugimura & Partners; First in-house patent attorney in Japan
- Awards: Medal of Honor with Blue Ribbon (1961)

Nobuchika "Shinkin" Sugimura (杉村 信近, Nobuchika Sugimura) was a Japanese inventor and patent attorney. He was the first chairman of the Japan Patent Attorneys Association.

== Career ==
After graduating from the University of Tokyo, Nobuchika joined Shibaura Seisakusho as a mechanical engineer. During his career there, he created 12 patented inventions including a US patent.

In 1920, he was qualified as a patent attorney and transferred to work in Shibaura's patent division. He was the first in-house patent attorney in Japan. In 1923, he left Shibaura and founded Sugimura International Patent and Trademark Attorneys. In 1925, he assisted Hidetsugu Yagi in securing a patent for the Yagi–Uda antenna. Yagi is listed among the Ten Japanese Great Inventors by the Japan Patent Office for this very invention.

In 1961, he was awarded by the Government of Japan with the Medal of Honor with Blue Ribbon (藍綬褒章) for all his contributions as a patent attorney.

== Select works ==
- Irène Joliot-Curie's Atomic Energy Generation Device Case
- Hidetsugu Yagi's directional antenna (Yagi antenna)
- 水力電気鉄筋混凝土管: 設計及工作法（Maruzen、1918、ASIN B0093ED2VS）
