= Industrial Property Digital Library =

The Industrial Property Digital Library (IPDL) is a free online service for searching Japanese patents, patent applications, utility models, designs and trademarks. It makes available to the public the intellectual property Gazettes of the Japan Patent Office (JPO). The IPDL provides around 55.5 million documents and their relevant information as published since the end of the 19th century.

The service was originally developed by the JPO, which had provided it since March 1999. The information is now available from the National Center for Industrial Property Information and Training (INPIT), since October 1, 2004.

The Patent Abstracts of Japan (PAJ) are accessible through the IPDL web site, and provide access to English abstracts of Japanese patent documents. The PAJ is published since 1976. The PAJ includes the legal status information since January 1993.
