= Intellectual Property High Court =

Branch of Tokyo High Court, Japan

Coordinates: 35.641651°N 139.703047°E

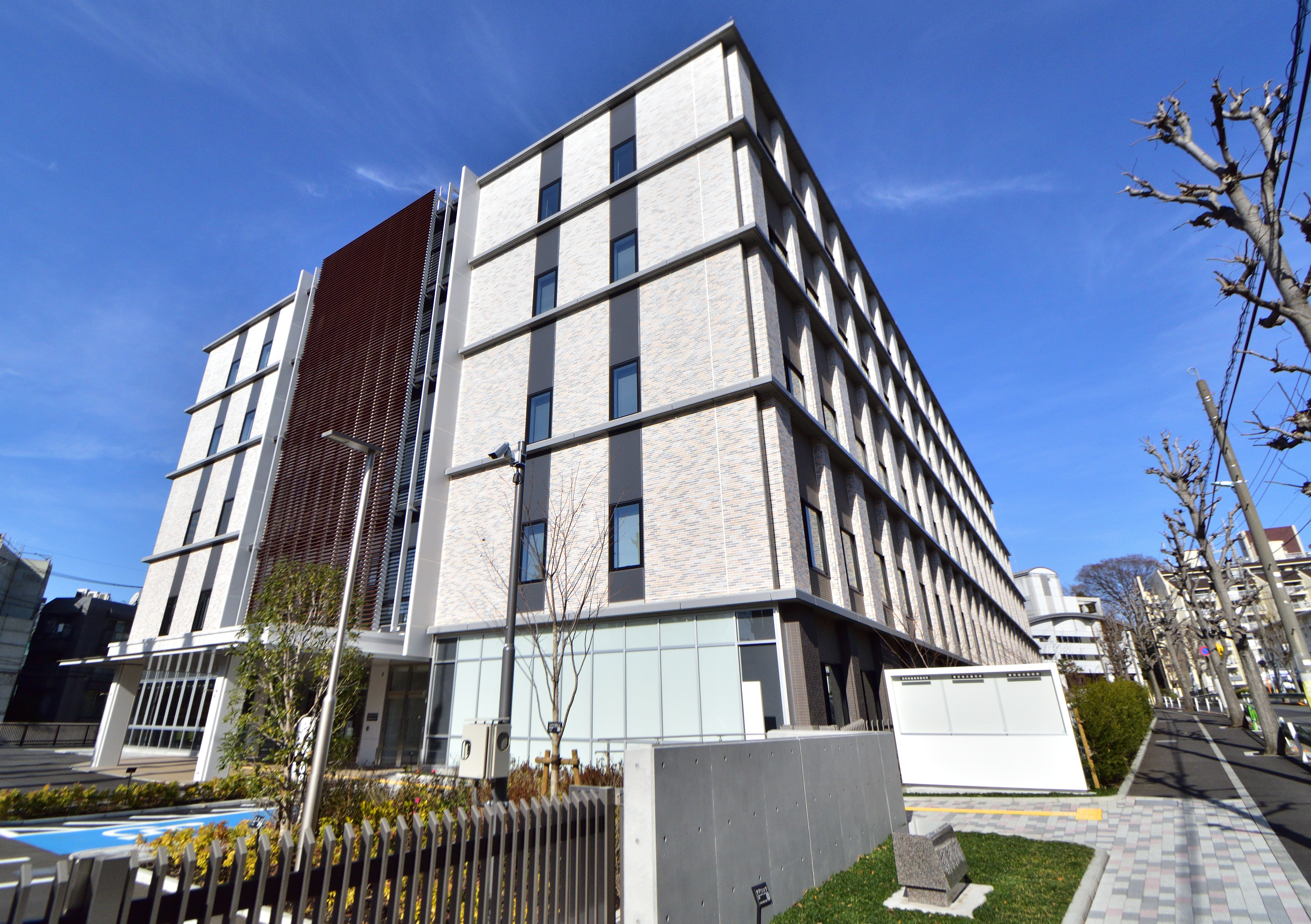
Building of the court

The Intellectual Property High Court (知的財産高等裁判所, Chiteki-zaisan kōtō-saiban-sho), sometimes abbreviated IPHC, is a special branch of Tokyo High Court in the judicial system of Japan. It is based in Nakameguro, a district in Meguro Ward in Tokyo, Japan.

The Intellectual Property (IP) High Court was established on 1 April 2005, in order to accelerate and reduce the costs of patent litigation in Japan. The IP High Court hears appeals from district courts in Japan on patent actions and suits against appeal/trial decisions made by the Japan Patent Office (JPO). The IP High Court is also the exclusive court of appeals on issues such as: the rights of authors of a computer program, utility model rights, and integrated circuit layout design protection.

Chief judges of the IP High Court
1. Katsumi Shinohara (April 2005 – April 2007).
2. Tomokatsu Tsukahara (May 2007 – ca. August 2010).
3. Tetsuhiro Nakano (August 2010 – March 2012)
4. Toshiaki Iimura (March 2012 – June 2014).
5. Ryuichi Shitara (June 2014 – January 2017).
6. Misao Shimizu (January 2017 – May 2018).
7. Makiko Takabe (May 2018 – ).
