= Glossary of patent law terms =

This is a list of legal terms relating to patents and patent law. A patent is not a right to practice or use the invention claimed therein, but a territorial right to exclude others from commercially exploiting the invention, granted to an inventor or their successor in rights in exchange to a public disclosure of the invention.

== A ==
=== Abandonment ===
Abandonment refers to the cessation of a patent application’s progress due to the applicant’s failure to make a bona fide attempt to advance the patent application to a final conclusion.

Abandonment in patent prosecution can occur either voluntarily or involuntarily:

- Voluntary abandonment (also called “express abandonment” or “formal abandonment”) occurs when the applicant explicitly communicates their intent to withdraw the application from consideration.
- Involuntary abandonment happens when the applicant fails to meet specific requirements, such as failing to respond to an office action or failing to paying required fees within the prescribed time frame. If no reply is received within the allotted period, the application may be considered abandoned or deemed withdrawn, depending on the jurisdiction, and is therefore no longer pending.

=== Allowance ===
Allowance refers to the stage in patent prosecution where the relevant patent office has determined that a patent application satisfies all legal requirements—such as novelty, non-obviousness or inventive step, feasibility, and utility or industrial applicability—and is ready for grant pending the completion of final formalities and paying requisite fees, if any.

=== Annuity fee ===
A fee to be paid to maintain a patent or a patent application in force. Also called "maintenance fee" or "renewal fee".

=== Application ===
An application for a patent, or patent application, is a formal request submitted to a competent authority (usually a patent office) by an applicant (usually an inventor, a group of inventors, or an organization) to grant a patent for an invention. The term "application" in this context also refers to the content of the document or documents filed to initiate the patent examination process. An application typically includes a detailed description of the invention and at least one claim defining the scope of protection sought. The application document serves as the foundation for evaluating whether the invention described therein meets the legal requirements for patentability.

=== Application abroad ===
An application filed by a resident of a given country/jurisdiction with a patent office of another country/jurisdiction. For example, a patent application filed by an applicant residing in France with the USPTO is considered an “ application abroad” from the perspective of France. “Application abroad” is a concept similar to “non-resident application”, which describes a patent application received by an IP office from an applicant residing in a country represented by another IP office.

=== Arrow declaration ===
A declaration sought from a court that a product to be launched was old or obvious at a particular date, so that the product cannot be affected by a later granted patent, which would also either lack novelty or inventive step.

=== Assignor estoppel ===
In United States patent law, an equitable estoppel barring a patent's seller (assignor) from attacking the patent's validity if they are found to have infringed that patent later.

=== Auslegeschrift ===
In outdated German patent law, the second reading, or publication, of a patent application.

=== Author’s certificate ===
A form of inventor's recognition formerly available in the Soviet Union and a number of Socialist countries. Also called "inventor's certificate".

== B ==
=== Bifurcation system ===
Legal system in which patent infringement and patent validity are decided upon by different courts. The German legal system is bifurcated as patent infringement is dealt with by district courts and patent validity by the Federal Patent Court (Bundespatentgericht). See also German patent law#Litigation.

=== Biogen sufficiency ===
U.K. law concept according to which, if "the extent of the monopoly claimed [in a patent] exceeds the technical contribution to the art made by the invention as described in the specification", the patent may be revoked on the ground of insufficiency of disclosure. The concept stems from the decision Biogen v. Medeva, issued by the House of Lords on 31 October 1996.

=== Bolar exemption ===
See research exemption.

=== Branching off ===
Under German patent law, a procedure consisting in deriving a utility model (German: Gebrauchsmuster) from a pending patent application. Also called "derivation". The corresponding German term is Abzweigung.

== C ==
=== Catch and release ===
The practice of a patent holding company buying a patent, offering a license to its members and then selling or donating the patent after a certain period of time.

=== Chapter I ===
In the Patent Cooperation Treaty (PCT), "Chapter I" refers to the prosecution procedure when no demand under Article 31 PCT is made. The states selected under Chapter I by the applicant are called "designated States".

=== Chapter II ===
In the PCT, "Chapter II" refers to the prosecution procedure when a demand under Article 31 PCT is made. An international preliminary examination is conducted in this case. The demand indicates the Contracting State or States in which the applicant intends to use the results of the international preliminary examination ("elected States").

=== Claim ===
A noun phrase defining the extent of the protection conferred by a patent, or the extent of protection sought in a patent application.

=== Claim chart ===
A chart often used in the context of patent litigation for analyzing and presenting information regarding a patent claim vis-à-vis an allegedly infringing product or method.

=== Claim construction ===
The process of interpreting or explaining the meaning of the terms in a patent claim, especially in the context of patent infringement.

=== Clearance search and opinion ===
A search done on issued patents or on pending patent applications to determine if a product or process infringes any of the claims of the issued patents or pending patent applications. These searches and opinions are also called freedom-to-operate searches and opinions. See Patent infringement.

=== Common general knowledge ===
A legal concept used notably when assessing whether an invention involves an inventive step, whether the disclosure of the invention is sufficiently clear and complete for a skilled person in the art to be able to carry out the invention, and whether the subject-matter of a prior art disclosure is enabling. The common general knowledge "is the common knowledge in the field to which the invention relates." The information "must be generally known and generally regarded as a good basis for further action by the bulk of those engaged in that art before it becomes part of their common stock of knowledge relating to the art, and so part of the common general knowledge."

Regarding the inventive step assessment, "[if] information is part of the common general knowledge then it forms part of the stock of knowledge which will inform and guide the skilled person's approach to the problem from the outset. It may, for example, affect the steps it will be obvious for him to take, including the nature and extent of any literature search."

Under European practice, "the common general knowledge of the person skilled in the art is, as a general rule, established on the basis of encyclopaedias, textbooks and the like". Exceptionally however, common general knowledge may also be established on the basis of the content of patent specifications "and in particular when a series of patent specifications provides a consistent picture that a particular technical procedure was generally known and belonged to the common general knowledge in the art at the relevant date".

=== Compulsory license ===
Using compulsory licenses, a government may force a patent proprietor to grant use to the state or others. Usually, the holder does receive some royalties, either set by law or determined through some form of arbitration.

=== Continuation-in-part application ===
Under United States patent law, a continuation-in-part is a type of continuing application that claims priority to a prior-filed application, repeats a substantial portion or all of the prior-filed application, and adds subject matter not disclosed in the prior-filed application.

Continuation-in-part applications share at least one inventor with the prior-filed application. A continuation-in-part application that has a sole inventor may derive from a prior-filed application that has joint inventors, and a continuation-in-part application that has joint inventors may derive from a prior-filed application that has a sole inventor.

=== Continuing application ===
A continuing patent application is a patent application that follows, and claims priority to, an earlier-filed patent application. According to United States patent law, a continuing application is a continuation, divisional, or continuation-in-part application filed under the conditions specified in 35 U.S.C. §§ 120, 121, 365(c), or 386(c) and 37 CFR § 1.78. For example, an active patent application, prior to final action, may give rise to additional applications for additional claims carrying the priority date of the original application. With the move to published applications, this has become a common way of producing submarine patents.

=== Contribution approach ===
Under European patent practice, a legal approach, now abandoned by the European Patent Office (EPO), for assessing whether an invention was patentable. The approach consisted in establishing whether the "contribution to the art" made by the invention was only in a field excluded from patentability by Article 52(2) and (3) EPC and, if so, the application could be refused. The EPO now applies the sometimes named "any hardware" or "any technical means" approach, notably formulated in EPO Board of Appeal decisions T 258/03 (Auction Method/Hitachi) and T 424/03 (Microsoft).

=== Contributory infringement ===
A form of indirect infringement.

=== Co-pending applications ===
Two or more patent applications are said to be co-pending, or copending, if they are both pending before the patent office and have been filed by the same applicant.

=== Counterclaim for revocation ===
A defense in an infringement action, consisting in the defendant arguing that the asserted patent is invalid or partially invalid, for example because its claimed subject-matter lacks novelty or is obvious in view of the prior art.

== D ==
=== DAS (Digital Access Service) ===
A system for exchanging priority documents electronically. Also referred to as "WIPO DAS".

=== Declaration of non-infringement ===
A declaration sought or obtained from a court that one's actions do not infringe a particular patent. An action for a declaration of non-infringement may be brought before a court as a preventive measure prior to being sued by a patent proprietor, for example if an infringement suit is believed to be imminent.

=== Defensive patenting ===
A practice consisting in "obtaining patents to stake [one's] claim to an area of technology in hopes of preventing other companies from suing them." See also defensive patent aggregation.

=== Defensive publication ===
A publication intended to prevent the grant of a patent to a competitor by placing information in the public domain.

=== Defensive termination ===
An implicit cross license where the licensor can terminate a patent license if the licensee turns around and sues the licensor for infringing a patent.

=== Demand letter ===
A letter sent to a company "seeking royalties and threatening legal action for patent infringement." Also called a "threat letter".

=== Demand under Chapter II ===
A request to subject an international application to an international preliminary examination under Chapter II of the Patent Cooperation Treaty (PCT).

=== Dependent claim ===
A claim comprising all the features of another claim.

=== Derivation proceeding ===
Proceedings under current U.S. patent law (i.e., since the March 16, 2013 effective date of the Leahy–Smith America Invents Act) to decide who is entitled to the grant of a patent for an invention. This replaced the former interference proceeding.

=== Design around ===
To develop an alternative apparatus or method (which may in itself also be a patentable invention) that does not infringe upon an issued patent. Also used as a noun.

=== Designated office ===
Under the Patent Cooperation Treaty (PCT), a national patent office of or acting for a State designated by the applicant under Chapter I of the PCT. See also "Chapter I" above.

=== Disclaimer ===
In a claim, words identifying subject-matter that is not claimed or, by extension, an amendment consisting in limiting a claim by introducing therein a negative technical feature.

=== Divided infringement ===
In U.S. patent law, a form of patent infringement liability that occurs when multiple actors are involved in carrying out the claimed infringement of a method patent and no single accused infringer has performed all of the steps of the method.

=== Divisional patent application ===
A type of patent application which contains matter from a previously-filed application. Also referred to simply as "divisional application".

=== Doctrine of equivalents ===
A legal rule that allows a court to hold a party liable for patent infringement even though the infringing device or process does not fall within the literal scope of a patent claim, but nevertheless is equivalent to the claimed invention.

=== Double patenting ===
The protection of one single invention by two patents, in the same jurisdiction, usually owned by the same proprietor.

=== Druckexemplar ===
At the European Patent Office, the application documents serving as the basis for the publication of the granted patent.

== E ==
=== Elected office ===
Under the Patent Cooperation Treaty (PCT), a national patent office of or acting for a State elected by the applicant under Chapter II of the PCT. See also "Chapter II" above.

=== Embodiment ===
In a patent or patent application, "a specific combination of features or a specific mode of carrying out the invention, by contrast to a more abstract definition of features which can be carried out in more than one way."

=== Essential patent ===
A patent claiming an invention that is required to implement a given industry standard.

=== European Patent Office (EPO) ===
A regional patent office responsible for granting European patents covering the Contracting States to the European Patent Convention (EPC). Under PCT procedures, the EPO acts as a Receiving Office, an International Searching Authority (ISA), and an International Preliminary Examining Authority (IPEA).

=== Evergreening ===
Various legal, business and technological strategies by which patentees extend or attempt to extend the patent protection for their products.

=== Exhaustion of rights ===
A legal concept according to which intellectual property (IP) rights, such as patent rights, in a product are exhausted by its sale. The concept of national exhaustion (exhaustion by sale in the domestic market), which is recognized in most countries around the world, is distinguished from the concept of regional or international exhaustion (exhaustion by sale in the domestic market), which is recognized in some countries but not in others.

=== Examination support document ===
According to USPTO patent rules, the examination support document (ESD) is a document submitted by an applicant that lists prior art and identifies how the prior art applies to the claims in a pending patent application.

== F ==
=== Fair, reasonable, and non-discriminatory licensing ===
A type of licensing typically used during standardisation processes. Also abbreviated "FRAND".

=== Field-of-use limitation ===
A provision in a patent license that limits the scope of what the patent owner authorizes a manufacturing licensee (that is, a licensee that manufactures a patented product or performs a patented process) to do in relation to the patent, by specifying a defined field of permissible operation or specifying fields from which the licensee is excluded.

=== File wrapper ===
The special folder type holding a U.S. patent application. The "file wrapper" was a large three section binder that interlineated to close into one large "wrapper." These paper File wrappers were fully digitized as of June 3, 2003 and are now called Image File Wrappers (IFW).

=== Filing date ===
The filing date of a patent application is the date the patent application was filed in one or more patent offices, i.e. the date on which that application is legally accepted at the patent office. That date is typically the date on which the documents are deposited at the office, but may be later if there are defects in the documents. See also Priority right.

In the United States, if a patent application is mailed to the United States Patent and Trademark Office (USPTO) by Express Mail, Post Office to Addressee, then the date the application was deposited in the post office is the filing date.

=== First inventor to file ===
A legal concept unique to United States patent law, mostly identical to a pure first-to-file system except that only filings by or on behalf of inventors are considered when determining patent rights.

=== First sale doctrine ===
See Exhaustion of rights.

=== First to file ===
A legal concept in which the right to a patent for an invention is determined by the first person to file for a patent to protect that invention, cf. First to invent.

=== First to invent ===
A legal concept in which the right to a patent for an invention is determined by the first person to make that invention, cf. First to file.

=== Flash of genius ===
A test for patentability formerly used by the United States Federal Courts.

=== Foreign filing license ===
A foreign filing license is an authorization granted by a governmental authority that permits an applicant to file a patent application in another country or jurisdiction. See also Patent application#Security issues.

=== Formstein defence ===
A defense against an alleged infringement by equivalents, wherein the alleged infringer claims that the embodiment alleged to be equivalent (to the subject-matter claimed in the patent) is not patentable and therefore the doctrine of equivalents does not apply.

=== Freedom-to-operate ===
A freedom-to-operate search is a search aimed at establishing whether a product or process is covered by patent rights, including patent and patent applications. If it does, commercially exploiting the product or process may lead to patent infringement. Freedom-to-operate analyses, opinions, and assessments are aimed at determining the risk of patent infringement in that respect. These searches and opinions are also called clearance searches and opinions.

=== Further medical use ===
See Second medical use.

== G ==
=== Gebrauchsmuster ===
A utility model in German and Austrian laws.

=== Gillette defense ===
A defense in patent litigation. More precisely, this is "the argument in infringement proceedings (...) that the defendant's product implements prior art technology, such that any patent which it infringes must be invalid."

=== Grant (to) ===
To "grant" a patent means issuing it to an applicant. Upon grant (or issuance), a patent application becomes a patent, and the applicant becomes patent holder (also called "patentee" or "patent proprietor").

== I ==
=== Independent claim ===
A claim that does not comprise the features of any other claim.

=== Indirect infringement ===
When a patent is infringed by some party other than the one actually directly engaged in the infringement of the invention, but the original party is the cause of the infringement. For instance, when a third party supplies a product which is intended to be used, or can only be reasonably used or worked upon to make the device claimed in a patent. In some jurisdictions, forms of indirect infringements include "contributory infringement" and "induced infringement".

=== Induced infringement ===
A form of indirect infringement.

=== Industrial applicability ===
A requirement of many patent systems, requiring that an invention be capable of industrial applicability in order for a patent to be granted for that invention.

=== Industrial property ===
One of two subsets of intellectual property (the other being copyright). It takes a range of forms, including patents for inventions, industrial designs, trademarks, service marks, layout-designs of integrated circuits, commercial names and designations, geographical indications and protection against unfair competition.

=== Information disclosure statement ===
In United States patent law, a submission of relevant background art or information to the United States Patent and Trademark Office (USPTO) by an applicant for a patent during patent prosecution.

=== Infringement ===
See Patent infringement.

=== Infringement action ===
Lawsuit initiated by a patentee in order to enforce their patent against an alleged infringer.

=== Injunction gap ===
In German patent law, a time gap that often results from the German bifurcated system (i.e., infringement and validity of patents are decided by different courts), when the decision on infringement is reached before the decision on validity.

=== Innovation patent ===
A type of patent in some countries used for inventions that have a short commercial life or that offers a comparatively small advance over existing technology. It often has a shorter term of protection, for example 8 years instead of 20 in Australia. See also utility model and petty patent.

=== Inter partes review ===
A procedure for challenging the validity of a US patent before the USPTO.

=== Interference proceeding ===
Under U.S. patent law, proceedings to decide who is entitled to the grant of a patent for an invention. These are now applicable only to patents with an effective filing date prior to March 16, 2013, the effective date of the Leahy–Smith America Invents Act that changed the U.S. to a "first-inventor-to-file" system. Replaced by the derivation proceeding.

=== Intermediate generalisation ===
At the European Patent Office (EPO), an amendment to a claim resulting in "an undisclosed combination of selected features lying somewhere between an originally broad disclosure and a more limited specific disclosure".

=== International application ===
A patent application filed under the Patent Cooperation Treaty (PCT). Also called "PCT application".

=== International phase ===
The period of time from the filing of a PCT application to the entry into national phases.

=== International preliminary examination report (IPER) ===
An examination report prepared under the Patent Cooperation Treaty (PCT).

=== Invalidity action ===
See Revocation action.

=== Invalidity opinion ===
An invalidity opinion, also called "validity opinion", is a legal opinion provided by an attorney on how a court might rule on the validity of an issued patent. Invalidity opinions are often sought prior to patent litigation. See Patent infringement.

=== Invention disclosure ===
A confidential document written by a scientist or engineer for use by a company's patent department, or by an external patent attorney, to determine whether patent protection should be sought for the described invention. The invention disclosure may then be used as primary input for preparing a patent application.

=== Invention promotion firm ===
A firm providing services to inventors to help them develop or market their inventions.

=== Inventive step ===
A patentability requirement according to which an invention must be inventive, i.e. non-obvious, in order to be patented.

=== Inventor ===
The actual devisor of an invention that is the subject of a patent. The inventor's employer is not the inventor. More than one inventor can be named on a patent.

=== Inventor's certificate ===
A form of recognition granted by communist states to inventors. "It does not grant to the inventor the exclusive right to use the invention or to preclude others from doing so but, rather, signifies that the invention is state property." See also author’s certificate.

=== IPR ===
See Inter partes review.

== K ==
=== Kind code ===
A code including a letter and often a digit, indicating a kind of patent document (e.g., published application or granted patent).

=== Kokai ===
A published, unexamined Japanese patent application.

=== Kokoku ===
An examined and approved Japanese patent application.

== L ==
=== Large entity ===
In United States patent law, one of the available applicant's status, along with the "small entity" status and the "micro entity" status.

=== Letters patent ===
An old term for a patent, sometimes used in reference to a bound formal copy of a patent provided by the USPTO to the inventor upon a patent's issue.

=== License ===
A contract wherein a party (the "licensor") grants to another party (the "licensee") the authorization to use an invention which is subject to a patent, generally in exchange of a financial compensation, the royalties.

=== License of right ===
A system under which the proprietor of a patent may file a declaration with the patent office indicating its willingness to grant a license to anyone interested, in exchange for a reduction in renewal fees. This system is available in some countries, such as in Germany (known under the German term "Lizenzbereitschaftserklärung"), in the UK, and for European patents with unitary effect.

== M ==
=== Machine-or-transformation test ===
A criterion in United States patent law, according to which a claimed process is patent-eligible (under § 101) if: (1) it is tied to a particular machine or apparatus, or (2) it transforms a particular article into a different state or thing. See also: in re Bilski.

=== Maintenance fee ===
A fee to be paid to maintain a patent or a patent application in force. Also called "annuity fee" or "renewal fee".

=== Markman hearing ===
A pre-trial hearing in the United States court system during which a judge hears testimony from both parties on the appropriate meanings of the relevant key words used in the claims of a patent, the infringement of which is alleged by the plaintiff.

=== Markush structure ===
An example of a theoretical Markush structure.

A representation of a chemical structure covering a group of chemical compounds. Markush structures are commonly used in patent claims. A claim comprising a Markush structure is called "Markush claim".

=== McKesson Reference ===
In United States patent law, an Information Disclosure Statement (IDS) reference to a communication with a patenting authority (e.g. office action response, or notice of allowance) in a related patent application. Based on the McKesson v. Bridge Medical decision where inequitable conduct was found where the applicant failed to notify the USPTO of such references. See also Inequitable conduct.

=== Marlow Reference ===
In United States patent law, an IDS reference to a court document (e.g. memorandum opinion, or a court order) pertaining to a litigation involving an application or a related patent/application. Based on the Marlow Industries, Inc. v. Igloo Products Corp. decision where the court found that the applicant had a duty to notify the USPTO of such references. See also Inequitable conduct.

=== Method ===
In United States patent law, a patent may notably claim a process or method. The claim gives right to exclude performance of the process or method, regardless of the equipment or technology used to do so.

=== Micro entity status ===
See "Small entity status" below.

=== Mutual property clauses ===
A clause regarding the usage of technologies that were developed jointly or in partnership.

== N ==
=== National phase ===
The prosecution phase wherein an international application filed under the Patent Cooperation Treaty (PCT) becomes subject to examination at a national level. In the United States, the term national stage is used instead—see 35 U.S.C. § 371.

=== Non-obviousness ===
A patentability requirement according to which an invention should not be obvious to a "person having ordinary skill in the art", in order to be patented.

=== Non-patent literature ===
Any technical document that is neither a patent nor a patent application and that is submitted by a party—such as an applicant, an opponent, or a third party—or cited by an examiner during patent prosecution. The non-patent literature includes especially scientific papers used as prior art to show that an invention claimed in a patent or patent application was known or obvious before the filing of the application. Also abbreviated "NPL".

=== Non-provisional patent application ===
A United States patent application that is not a provisional application. The term arose in 1995 to distinguish what were at the time "normal" patent applications from the newly established provisional applications. A complete non-provisional application differs from a provisional in that a non-provisional must contain at least one claim and is to be examined. A non-provisional application may also claim priority to a prior filed application, which is not permitted with provisional applications.

=== Novelty ===
A patentability requirement according to which an invention is not patentable if it was already publicly known before the date of filing.

=== Nullity action ===
See Revocation action.

== O ==
=== Objective technical problem ===
In the so-called "problem-solution approach" applied by the European Patent Office (EPO) to assess whether a claimed invention involves an inventive step (Article 56 EPC), the problem that the notional skilled person is tasked with solving. If the skilled person, starting from the closest prior art and faced with the objective technical problem, would have arrived, without exercising any inventive skill, at the claimed invention, then the claimed invention is regarded as being obvious, i.e. the claimed invention does not involve an inventive step.

=== Office action ===
A formal report from a Patent Office examiner to an inventor or attorney detailing which claims in a patent application were allowed for later issue (publication) in a patent and which claims were rejected. The examiner gives reasons for allowance or rejection. Some other examiner's requests (e.g. a demand to split a patent application into two or more divisional patent applications) also qualify as "office actions".

=== On-sale bar ===
A concept of U.S. law in which the grant of a patent is prevented if the invention that is the subject of the patent application was on sale more than one year prior to the priority date. In most other jurisdictions on sale bar is triggered at the moment the sale occurs, and they do not provide for a grace period like the US.

=== Opposition proceeding ===
Proceedings in which a third party opposes the grant of a patent in an attempt to prevent that grant, or have the patent revoked. Opposition proceedings may be pre- or post-grant.

== P ==
=== Patent ===
A territorial right to prevent others from commercially exploiting an invention, granted to an inventor or the inventor's successor in rights in exchange for the public disclosure of the invention. A patent is regarded as a specific type of intellectual property right, and is granted for a limited period of time, the term of the patent.

=== Patent ambush ===
A patent ambush occurs when a member of a standard-setting organization withholds information, during participation in development and setting a standard, about a patent that the member or the member's company owns, has pending, or intends to file, which is relevant to the standard, and subsequently the company asserts that a patent is infringed by use of the standard as adopted.

=== Patent Application Locating and Monitoring System (PALM) ===
The Patent Application Locating and Monitoring System (PALM) is used to support the Reexamination process inside the USPTO. Reexamination is the examination of a granted patent, which can result in the revocation of that patent. The PALM system is used with both Image File Wrappers and paper File Wrappers. See Manual of Patent Examination and Procedure, Section 2235.

=== Patent caveat ===
Formerly, in United States patent law, a legal document filed with the United States Patent Office. Caveats were discontinued in 1909. A caveat was like a patent application with a description of an invention and drawings, but without claims. It was an official notice of intention to file a patent application at a later date.

=== Patent classification ===
Classification of patents in technological areas for convenient retrieval during prior art searches.

=== Patent drawing ===
Technical drawing in a patent application, that illustrates the invention. It may be required by law to be in a particular form.

=== Patent family ===
A group of patents related by a common priority claim.

=== Patent flooding ===
Patenting every possible way of doing something.

=== Patent infringement ===
Commercially exploiting a patented invention without permission of the patent holder.

=== Patent misuse ===
In United States patent law, an affirmative defense used in patent litigation after the defendant has been found to have infringed a patent.

=== Patent model ===
A miniature model that shows how an invention works.

=== Patent monetization ===
The generation of revenue or the attempt to generate revenue by a person or company by selling or licensing the patents it owns.

=== Patent pending ===
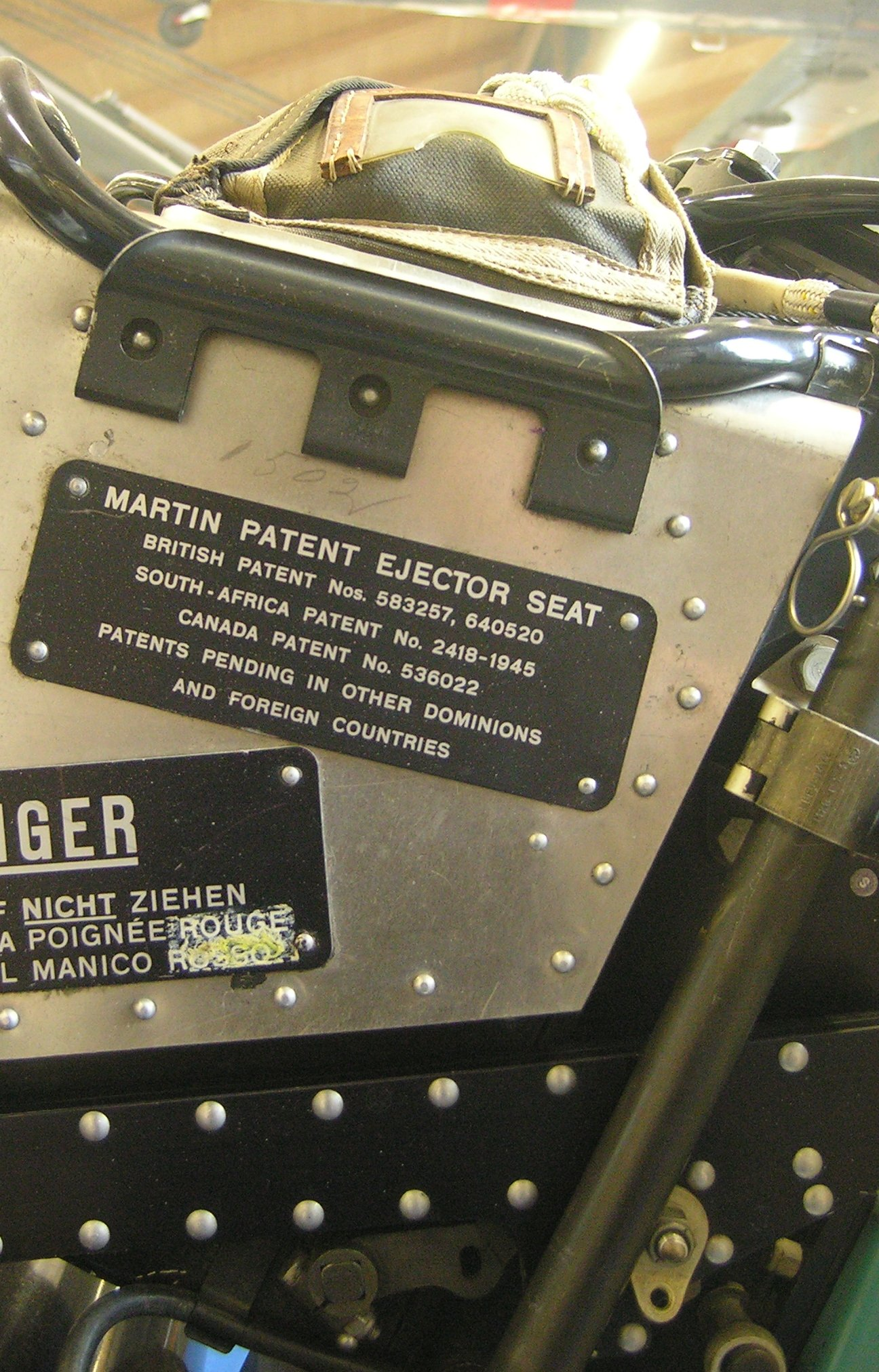
The plate of the Martin ejector seat of the military aircraft, stating "Patents pending in other dominions and foreign countries". Dübendorf Museum of Military Aviation.

A warning that a patent application has been filed for an invention integrated in a product. The warning indicates that the applicant(s) may be entitled to some rights even if a patent has not been granted yet, or that the applicant(s) will be entitled to some rights once a patent is granted.

=== Patent pool ===
A consortium of at least two companies agreeing to cross-license patents and other IP rights relating to a particular technology.

=== Patent portfolio ===
A collection of patents owned by a single entity, such as an individual or corporation.

=== Patent specification ===
See specification.

=== Patent thicket ===
A dense web of overlapping intellectual property rights that a company must navigate through in order to commercialize new technology.

=== Patent troll ===
A person or company who enforces patent rights against accused infringers in an attempt to collect licensing fees, but does not manufacture products or supply services based upon the patents in question. Also called a patent assertion entity (PAE) or non practicing entity (NPE).

=== Patent watch ===
A process for monitoring newly issued patents on a periodic basis to see if any of these patents might be of interest.

=== Patentability ===
A set of substantive requirements for a patent to be granted. An invention satisfying these requirements is said to be patentable.

=== Patentability opinion ===
An opinion as to whether an invention might be patentable. Such an opinion may be established by a patent attorney to assist an inventor or company into deciding whether to file a patent application.

=== Patentable subject matter ===
Patent systems exclude certain areas from the grant of patents. Material not so excluded is known as patentable subject matter.

=== Patentee ===
One to whom a patent was granted. Also called "patent holder", "patent proprietor", or "patent right holder".

=== Pay-for-delay ===
A deal under which a company holding a patent on a drug pays a generic manufacturer to delay its launch of a cheap copy of the drug.

=== PCT application ===
A patent application filed under the Patent Cooperation Treaty (PCT). Also called "international application".

=== PCT Direct ===
A procedural scheme launched in 2014 by the European Patent Office (EPO). The scheme consists in allowing an applicant filing a PCT application claiming priority from an earlier application already searched by the EPO to reply –at the time of filing the PCT application– to any objections raised in the search opinion drawn up for the priority application.

=== Person having ordinary skill in the art ===
A notional, i.e. fictional, person (also referred to simply as "the skilled person") having typical or average knowledge of a particular field or art. The notion is used for example to assess whether a claimed invention is nonobvious in view of the prior art or whether the specification of the patent enables one to practice what is claimed, in the light of the general knowledge of the "skilled person".

=== Petition to make special ===
A United States patent law procedure that requests the U.S. Patent and Trademark Office to accelerate a patent's prosecution, based on a showing that certain conditions are met. For example, if the inventor is old or sick, or the field of invention is a favored area of science that significantly enriches people's lives, The U.S. PTO may allow such a petition.

=== Petty patent ===
Phrase sometimes used to refer to utility models and Gebrauchsmuster, which are specific forms of patents for inventions usually granted for a shorter term, i.e. mostly 6 or 10 years instead of 20 years. In some jurisdictions, the patentability criteria applicable to petty patents are less stringent than those applicable to 20-year patents. See also innovation patent.

=== PGR ===
See post-grant review.

=== PHOSITA ===
In the United States, an abbreviation for "person having ordinary skill in the art".

=== PI ===
See Preliminary injunction.

=== Piracy ===
Pejorative term. Generally refers to the willful infringement of a patent. May also be applied to the vigorous enforcement of a patent.

=== Post-grant review ===
In United States patent law, a proceeding to review the patentability of one or more claims of a U.S. patent. The proceeding can be started within 9 months from the grant of the patent, or within 9 months from the issuance of a reissue patent.

=== Pre-grant Publication ===
Pre-grant Publication (PGpub) is the procedure under 35 U.S.C. Section 122(b) requiring the publication of most United States patent applications 18 months after their filing dates. This procedure was first enacted in the 1999 American Inventors Protection Act.

=== Preliminary injunction ===
An injunction issued by a court prior to a final determination of the merits of a legal case, in order to restrain a party from going ahead with a course of conduct or compelling a party to continue with a course of conduct until the case has been decided. In patent law, a preliminary injunction typically allows a patent to be enforced against an infringer prior to a final decision on the merits, i.e. while the infringement proceedings are pending. Depending on the jurisdiction, a number of requirements may have to be met for the court to grant a preliminary injunction, such as: urgency (to prevent imminent harm to the patentee's business), clear infringement, and a sufficient likelihood that the patent is valid. A preliminary injunction may be granted ex parte, i.e. without hearing the defendant, or inter partes, i.e. after having heard the defendant.

=== Prior art ===
Material publicly available prior to the priority date of an application which may anticipate the subject of and prevent the grant of a patent.

=== Prior use defense ===
See prior use right. Also known as "prior user right defense" or "prior user rights defense".

=== Prior use right ===
Under certain jurisdictions, a limited right, or set of limited rights, allowing a prior user of a patented invention to continue to do so, despite the existence of the patent. The prior use must have started before the priority date of the patent. In some jurisdictions, the right may also stem from the possession of the patented invention before the priority date of the patent. The existence of a prior use(r) right –or prior possession right– may be invoked as a defense against a patent infringement claim. Also known as "prior use rights", "prior user right", or "prior user rights".

=== Priority date ===
See priority right.

=== Priority period ===
The "period of 12 months starting from the filing date of the earlier (or earliest if there is more than one) [patent] application whose priority is claimed in" a subsequent patent application. See also priority right.

=== Priority right ===
A right to benefit from the filing date of an earlier application in a subsequent application. Claiming a priority right means that the filing date of the earlier application, i.e. the "priority date", rather than the actual date of filing of the subsequent application, will be used as the decisive date for assessing patentability of the invention claimed in the subsequent application.

=== Problem-solution approach ===
Under the case law and practice of the European Patent Office (EPO), a systematic approach to assess whether an invention involves an inventive step. Also called "problem and solution approach".

=== Prosecution history estoppel ===
In certain states, most notably the United States, actions during prosecution can estop a party from certain later actions or assertions.

=== Protective letter ===
A letter that a person may file with a court, as a precautionary measure, to explain to the court that they do not infringe a specific patent, and/or that they consider the patent to be invalid, in an attempt to prevent the court from granting any ex parte preliminary injunction to the patentee, if the patentee were to ask the court for ordering preliminary measures in the future. Protective letters can for example be filed with the Unified Patent Court (UPC). At the UPC, a protective letter has effect for 6 months (extendable).

=== Provisional application ===
In United States patent law, a legal document filed in the United States Patent and Trademark Office (USPTO) that establishes an early filing date, but which does not mature into an issued patent unless the applicant files a regular patent application within one year. See also Non-provisional patent application.

=== Provisional (patent) rights or provisional protection ===
The rights conferred to a published patent application, i.e. the rights conferred before the patent is granted. See also U.S. patent law, 35 USC 154(d). Under the European Patent Convention,

"for the period of provisional protection, between the moment of publication of the patent application and the moment of the publication of the patent grant, Article 67 EPC requires Member States to ensure that the applicant can claim compensation reasonable in the circumstances from any person who has used the invention in their territory. Following publication of the mention of the patent grant, full compensation of any losses suffered may be claimed, depending also on whether the infringer knew or should have known that he or she was infringing."

== R ==
=== Reading a claim ===
The process of establishing patent infringement involves "reading" a claim onto the technology of interest. If all of the claim's elements are found in the technology, the claim is said to "read on" the technology; if a single element from the claim is missing from the technology, the claim does not literally read on the technology and the technology does not infringe the patent with respect to that claim. Also, the process of contesting or invalidating a patent can involve showing that the claim reads on prior art, i.e., the claim's elements are found in the prior art.

=== Reasonable and non-discriminatory licensing ===
A type of licensing typically used during standardisation processes. Also abbreviated "RAND".

=== Reduction to practice ===
In United States patent law, making or performing an invention (actual reduction to practice) or filing a patent application describing how to make and use an invention (constructive reduction to practice). Important for determining which party is "first to invent".

=== Reexamination ===
The examination of a granted patent, which can result in the revocation of that patent.

=== Regional patent ===
A single patent covering a set of countries. As of 2012, the only true regional patent covering more than two countries appears to be the OAPI patent. The European patent, the Eurasian patent, and the ARIPO patent each effectively lead, once granted, to a bundle of national patents for which there might be separate translation requirements (for example in the European Patent Convention), maintenance fees, durations of protection (for example with ARIPO) and separate jurisdiction exist (a patent invalidated in one country might still be valid in others). The unitary patent for Switzerland and Liechtenstein can also be regarded as a regional patent with a truly unitary effect. See also unitary patent.

=== Regional phase ===
The prosecution phase wherein an international application filed under the Patent Cooperation Treaty (PCT) becomes subject to examination at a regional level. There are four regional patent treaties: the European Patent Convention, the Eurasian Patent Convention, the Bangui Agreement (see African Intellectual Property Organization or OAPI), and the Harare Protocol (see African Regional Intellectual Property Organization or ARIPO). See also National phase.

=== Registration patent ===
A type of patent that takes effect, even if the substantial requirements (e.g. regarding novelty) have not been fulfilled. The Belgian, Dutch and French patents are examples of registration patents.

=== Reissue patent ===
A U.S. patent that is reissued by the USPTO after the patentee filed an application for reissue, because the originally issued patent was regarded as defective.

=== Rejection ===
In the United States, to have patent claims "rejected" in a patent application means that the subject matter as claimed is considered by the patent examiner to be unpatentable. A final Office action based on rejection of claims is subject to review by the Board of Patent Appeals and Interferences (BPAI). cf Objections, supra.

=== Request for continued examination ===
In the United States, a request by an applicant for continued prosecution after the patent office has issued a "final" rejection or after prosecution "on the merits" has been closed (for example by a Notice of Allowance (NOA)).

=== Research exemption ===
In some legislations, an exemption to the rights conferred by patents, pursuant to which performing research and tests for preparing regulatory approval does not constitute infringement for a limited term before the end of patent term.

=== Restitutio in integrum ===
In the European Patent Convention, a means of redress following a loss of right due to the non-observance of a time limit in spite of all due care.

=== Revocation action ===
Lawsuit initiated by a party requesting a patent to be declared invalid, i.e. to be revoked. Also called "invalidity action" or "nullity action". A revocation action may be –and is often– initiated as a reaction to an infringement action (see also counterclaim for revocation).

== S ==
=== Sandor Obviousness ===
In United States patent law, an obviousness rejection based on a single reference. Generally a case for an obviousness rejection requires the examiner to rely on 2 or more references. Sandor Obviousness stems from Ex Parte Sandor Nagy where the examiner relied on only a single reference to reject the claims at issue. Ultimately the case was remanded on appeal back to the examiner.

=== Search report ===
A report established by a patent office, which mentions documents which may be taken into consideration in deciding whether the invention to which a patent application relates is patentable.

=== Second medical use ===
The patenting of a particular medical use of a molecule (or more generally product or composition), wherein a first particular use of a molecule is already known and, therefore, wherein the novel and inventive aspect lies solely in the second use of the molecule. Also known as further medical use.

=== Selection invention ===
An invention consisting in the selection of individual elements, sub-sets, or sub-ranges, within a larger, known set or range. A selection patent is a patent granted on a selection invention.

=== Selection patent ===
See selection invention.

=== Shop right ===
In U.S. patent law, an implied license under which a firm may use a patented invention, invented by an employee who was working within the scope of their employment, using the firms' equipment, or inventing at the firms' expense.

=== Skilled person (in the art) ===
See person having ordinary skill in the art.

=== Small entity status ===
In United States patent law, a status allowing small businesses, independent inventors, and nonprofit organizations to file a patent application and maintain an issued patent for a reduced fee. An entity that does not qualify for small entity status is charged double the fees charged small entities.

Changes to US patent law in December 2012 created a sub-category of Small Entity Status called "Micro Entity Status" for inventors who qualify for Small Entity Status, but also have a gross income less than a certain amount, and have assigned their patent(s) to their employer which is an institution of higher education.

=== Software patent ===
A patent in the field of computer software. Some types of inventions in the field of software are legally considered non-patentable subject-matter, depending on the jurisdiction. See also software patents under the European Patent Convention, under TRIPs Agreement, under United Kingdom patent law, under United States patent law, computer programs and the Patent Cooperation Treaty, software patent debate.

=== Specification ===
The specification, or patent specification, may either refer to the description of a patent or patent application, which is the meaning prevalent in the U.S., or to the complete patent as granted, which is meaning prevalent in Europe.

=== State of the art ===
A synonym for prior art.

=== Statutory Invention Registration ===
A procedure governed by MPEP Sections 1100 et al. in which a patent applicant could request a public filing of their application. Usually, this was used when the applicant felt a patent was no longer possible during the application period. It may now be obsolete due to the 1999 America Inventors Protection Act which required publication of U.S. applications in 18 months unless an exception applied.

=== Submarine patent ===
A patent first published and granted long after the original application was filed.

=== Sufficiency of disclosure ===
An important requirement to be met by a patent in order to be validly granted. According to this requirement, an invention must be described in the application or patent in a sufficiently clear and complete manner to enable the person skilled in the art to carry out the invention.

=== Supplementary international search ===
A prior art search performed for an international (PCT) application in addition to the main international search provided for under the Patent Cooperation Treaty (PCT). The supplementary international search (SIS) is carried out by another International Searching Authority (ISA) than the ISA that carries out the main international search.

=== Supplementary protection certificate ===
A sui generis right notably available for medicinal and plant protection products. The right comes into force after the corresponding patent expires and, for medicinal and plant protection products, has a maximum term (i.e., lifetime) of 5 years.

=== Swear back of a reference ===
A procedure under U.S. patent law whereby an inventor can get a patent even if the invention has become public before the patent application was filed. Also "Swear behind a reference" or "Antedate" a reference. See 35 USC Section 102.

== T ==
=== Technical character ===
A condition for an invention to be considered patentable under the case law and practice of the European Patent Office (EPO). Namely, an invention must notably have a technical character to be patentable. See for example Software patents under the European Patent Convention.

=== Term of patent ===
The maximum period during which it can be maintained in force.

=== Transfer ===
An operation by which ownership of a patent or patent application changes (for instance as a result of a financial transaction).

=== Transitional phrase ===
In United States patent law, a phrase that links the preamble of a patent claim to the specific elements set forth in the claim which define what the invention itself actually is. The transitional phrase acts as a limitation on the claim, indicating whether a similar device, method, or composition infringes the patent if it contains more or fewer elements than the claim in the patent.

== U ==
=== Unified Patent Court ===
A common patent court open for participation of all member states of the European Union, and established by the "Agreement on a Unified Patent Court" (UPCA), which is in force since June 1, 2023.

=== Unitary patent ===
A patent having a unitary effect throughout the territories of more than one country. The unitary patent in the European Union, also called "European patent with unitary effect", is the most well-known unitary patent. Other unitary patents are the unitary patent in Switzerland and Liechtenstein and the OAPI patent. See also regional patent.

=== Unity of invention ===
A requirement that a patent application can relate only to one invention (or to a group of inventions so linked as to form a single general inventive concept). See for instance Unity of invention under the European Patent Convention.

=== Utility ===
A patentability requirement mainly used to prevent the patenting of inoperative devices such as perpetual motion machines.

=== Utility model ===
An intellectual property right which is very similar to the patent, but usually has a shorter term (often 6 or 10 years) and may have less stringent patentability requirements. See also petty patent and innovation patent.

=== Utility patent ===
Phrase sometimes used, primarily in the US, to distinguish the primary meaning of the term "patent" from other types of patents, such as design patents and plant patents. See also: Patent#Definition.

== V ==
=== Validity opinion ===
A validity opinion, also called "invalidity opinion", is a legal opinion provided by an attorney on how a court might rule on the validity of an issued patent. Validity opinions are often sought prior to patent litigation. See Patent infringement.

== X ==
=== X-Patent ===
Patent issued by the United States Patent and Trademark Office between July 1790 (when the first U.S. patent was issued) and July 1836.

== See also ==
- List of patent case law
- List of people associated with patent law
