= Swear back of a reference =

Concept in US patent law

In United States patent law, "swearing back of a reference" is a process where an inventor, in certain circumstances, can get a US patent even though the invention became public before the inventor filed an original patent application. This law has been substantially changed as of March 16, 2013, the effective date of the first-to-file provisions of the Leahy-Smith America Invents Act (AIA), although this procedure is still available in patent applications entitled to effective filing dates before this date.

The pre-AIA law granted a one-year grace period from when the invention became known in certain ways to when an inventor had to file their patent application. If, in the course of patent application examination, a patent examiner cites a reference that predates the filing date of the patent application by less than a year, an inventor may still get a US patent if they can swear back of the publication date of the reference.

== Procedure ==
To effectively swear back of a reference, an inventor submits a declaration to the US patent office, with written evidence that shows they fully conceived of the invention before the effective date of the reference. They must also show they were diligent in either reducing the invention to practice or in filing a patent application.

Documentary evidence must support all factual assertions in the swear back. A copy of a notebook page that describes the invention, signed by the inventor, dated, and preferably witnessed by a third party can serve as written evidence. A written declaration by a witness that attests to when the invention was conceived can also be adequate. Similar evidence may be used to support the assertion of diligence.

It can be very difficult to demonstrate diligence. The inventor, for example, must work continuously on the invention. If the inventor works on another invention before the first one is reduced to practice, that destroys the continuity and the inventor is deemed to not have been sufficiently diligent to be entitled to a patent. Many other restrictions apply as well.
