= Inventor's notebook =

An inventor's notebook is used by inventors, scientists and engineers to record their ideas, invention process, experimental tests and results and observations. It is not a legal document but is valuable, if properly organized and maintained, since it can help establish dates of conception and reduction to practice. It may be considered as grey literature. The information can improve the outcome of a patent or a patent contestation.

== Purpose ==
A patent grants its owner(s) the right to sue those who manufacture and market products or services that infringe on the claims declared in the patent. Typically, governments award patents on either a first to file or first to invent basis. Therefore, it is important to keep and maintain records that help establish who is first to invent a particular invention.

The inventor's notebook (also called a journal, lab book or log book) is a systematic device for recording all information related to an invention in such a way that it can be used to develop a case during a patent contestation or patent-related lawsuit.

The notebook is also a valuable tool for the inventor since it provides a chronological record of an invention and its reduction to practice. Each entry must be signed and dated by a witness. The witness should not be someone with a conflict of interest (such as a research partner). If an inventor ever has to go to court to prove that they were the first to make the invention, then the witness would be called to the stand to testify that the signature is theirs and they signed that page on that date.

A "virtual inventor's notebook", in which one scans note pages and emails them to oneself, would not provide the same legal protection as a bound inventor's notebook since it is easier to commit fraud with a virtual notebook.

The need for an inventor's notebook will diminish in the future as the United States is progressively implementing a first-to-file system pursuant to the Leahy-Smith America Invents Act. It has been said that first-to-file eliminates a troubling source of litigation, particularly for individual inventors who may lack the processes and legal resources to defend against evidentiary challenges by large corporate research organizations.

== Famous notebooks ==
Though not necessarily following all the guidelines above, journals and notebooks have been kept by many famous inventors, scientists and engineers. Some of the most well-known journals include those of:

- Leonardo da Vinci
- Galileo Galilei
- Evangelista Torricelli
- Alessandro Volta
- Thomas A. Edison
- Thomas Jefferson
- Albert Einstein
- Nikola Tesla
- Frederic Tudor

== See also ==
- Lab notebook
- Electronic lab notebook
- Invention disclosure
- Interference proceeding
- Swear back of a reference
- Grey literature
