= Morrells of Oxford Ltd v Oxford United Football Club =

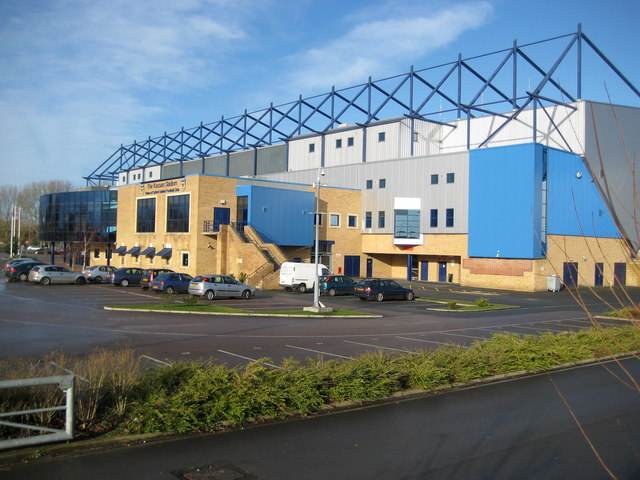
- The Kassam Stadium and Conference Venue built 1996-2001 on Minchery Farm includes alcohol licensed areas. These, the case held, were covenant-barred only between the original parties to the covenant.
- Court: Court of Appeal
- Citation: [2001] Ch 459

Keywords
- Covenants

Morrells of Oxford Ltd v Oxford United Football Club [2001] Ch 459 is an English land law case concerning covenants and their interpretation in a conveyance, particularly discerning and distinguishing those expressly or impliedly with no intention to bind successors — those of a personal nature, enforceable "inter partes", that is between the parties to the original deed. It concerned a restraint of trade covenant and was unlike the others surrounding it (see purposive interpretation and contextual interpretation) not expressed to bind all heirs and assigns (or other synonyms for successors in title).

== Facts ==
Morrells of Oxford Ltd trading as Morrells Brewery, were the successors in title to the original purchaser of a pub (i.e. they are the current owners). They sought to enforce a covenant against the developers of adjoining land, who were the successors in title to the local authority and whose registered land referred also to the same deed. In selling this adjoining farmland four decades before, the council had agreed not to allow the (alcohol-) licensing of premises within half a mile of the pub which they licensed and allowed to be built on that basis in the 1960s. The covenant was clear enough to qualify for enforcement if the local authority proposed to breach the covenant by selling alcohol on its own land but they did not and were in the process of selling the land to independent developers who ultimately built the Kassam Stadium of Oxford United FC. The stadium's developer calculated it was a commercial necessity for an on-site alcohol consumption licence to be legally permissible on the site before completing their purchase of the stadium. The relevant, contentious Deed of Conveyance dated to 1962. Morrells argued that it bound and benefitted both sets of successors (respectively) by meeting the requirements of the Law of Property Act 1925, section 79.

== Judgment ==
Robert Walker LJ held the purpose of s 79 was to remove the difficulty of expressing an intention to bind successors by allowing in some cases that intention to be presumed unless a contrary intention was apparent. Here the other covenants in the conveyance made it clear they should bind successors. The court held that the absence of such words in the covenant amounted to the contrary intention, that is an intention not to bind successors. The covenant was thus personal in nature (inter partes) and could not be enforced against successors in title. He said that Law of Property Act 1925, section 79 ‘extends the number of persons whose acts or omissions are within the reach of the covenant in the sense of making equitable remedies available, provided that the other conditions for equity’s intervention are satisfied.’

The section on its own (per se) does not make all covenants bind all successors, it leaves latitude as to construction (wording) as whether certain covenants are to be considered personal, those which are imposed so as not to bind the land itself. He summarised the applicable test for whether a covenant touches and concerns the land: "A’s duty is a duty not to make a particular use of A’s land; and A’s duty enhances B’s Freehold or Lease (i.e. benefits B’s land); and A’s duty, when created, is not intended to impose only a personal duty on A."

== Cases cited ==
=== Applied ===
- Inland Revenue Comrs v Bernstein [1961] Ch 399; [1961] 2 WLR 143; [1961] 1 All ER 341, CA Obiter dictum of Lord Evershed MR; [1961] Ch 399, 413

=== Considered ===
- Sefton v Tophams Ltd [1967] 1 AC 50; [1966] 2 WLR 814; [1966] 1 All ER 1039, HL(E)
- In re Royal Victoria Pavilion, Ramsgate [1961] Ch 581; [1961] 3 WLR 491; [1961] 3 All ER 83, Ch D
- Powell v Hemsley [1909] 2 Ch 252, CA

== See also ==
- English land law
- English trusts law
- English property law
