= Sufficiency of disclosure =

Concept in patent law

Sufficiency of disclosure or enablement is a patent law requirement that a patent application disclose a claimed invention in sufficient detail so that the person skilled in the art could carry out that claimed invention. The requirement is fundamental to patent law: a monopoly is granted for a given period of time in exchange for a disclosure to the public how to make or practice the invention.

== Background ==
The disclosure requirement lies at the heart and origin of patent law. An inventor, or the inventor's assignee, is granted a monopoly for a given period of time in exchange for the inventor disclosing to the public how to make or practice their invention. If a patent fails to contain such information, then the bargain is violated, and the patent is unenforceable or can be revoked.

Inventors who do not wish to teach the world about their invention still have some protection under trade secret law, which protects valuable secrets from being misappropriated through unfair means (such as theft or industrial espionage). But unless inventors apply for a valid, enabling patent, they cannot take advantage of patent law's monopoly rights, and thus cannot stop competitors from developing the same product or process through proper means (such as independent invention or reverse engineering). Enabling disclosure is the price an inventor pays for patent monopoly.

== Jurisdictions ==
=== Europe ===
Article 83 of the European Patent Convention states that an application must disclose the invention in a manner sufficiently clear and complete for it to be carried out by a person skilled in the art. Sufficiency is considered by the examiner during examination of a patent application and the requirement of Article 83 must be complied with in order for a patent to be granted. Insufficient disclosure is also a ground for opposition under Article 100(b) EPC and a ground for revocation under Article 138(1)(b) EPC. Insufficiency is also a ground for revocation under Section 72 of the UK Patents Act.

For instance, an insufficiency of disclosure might arise if references to standardisation documents are provided to support essential aspects of the invention, but if these references are not sufficiently precise so that "the skilled person would have to make ... undue efforts to find and get together the information it needs to carry out the invention".

=== United States ===
The patent law in the United States requires, among other things, that the patent specification "contain a written description of the invention, and of the manner and process of making and using it, in such full, clear, concise, and exact terms as to enable any person skilled in the art to which it pertains, or with which it is most nearly connected, to make and use the same."

US Federal Courts and legal commentators have interpreted this statement as having two related but distinct requirements: written description and enablement. Although enablement and written description requirements share many similarities, their purposes are different.

The enablement requirement relates to teaching how to make/use the invention. In contrast, the written description requirement allows the patent owner to justify its claims, which determine the boundaries of the temporal monopoly on the invention. Also noteworthy is that US courts treat enablement as a ‘‘question of law based on underlying factual findings,’’ (i.e. with a judge having the final word), while written description requirement is a question of fact, decided by a jury.

In other words, the purpose of written description is to support the terminology and the scope of patent claims. A patentee is not allowed to claim something that is not supported by the text of patent disclosure — this is the purpose of the written description. On the other hand, the purpose of enablement is to teach a person of ordinary skill in the art how to make and use the invention without undue experimentation. Enablement is a key part of the patent "bargain"- an inventor gets a monopoly in return for teaching the world about their invention.

Although in theory both "written description" and "enablement" should be applied to individual claims, when US courts find a lack of enablement, they usually invalidate the whole patent rather than individual claims. The historic evolution of the written description and enablement requirements can be found here.

==== Enablement ====
A patent disclosure "enables" the invention, if it allows a person of ordinary skill in the art to practice the invention without undue experimentation. Patents may fail this test if they claim more than they teach: for example, a patent that claims all light bulbs but explains only how to make a particular type of light bulb. A patent may also be non-enabling, if it claims the use of tungsten filaments in a lightbulb, but it does not disclose how to make tungsten filaments, and there is no publicly known method of making them.

A patent claim that does not meet the enablement requirement may be rejected by the patent examiner before patent issuance or declared invalid upon re-examination or litigation after issuance. Enablement is determined as of the filing date of the patent, and patent owners cannot use experiments conducted post-application to establish the validity of their patents.

==== Undue experimentation ====
Under the patent law in the United States, the enablement requirement is not satisfied, if a person having "ordinary skill in the art" (PHOSITA) of the invention cannot make and use the invention without undue experimentation.

Undue experimentation is not based on quantity of experimentation as much as it is on unpredictability of outcome. In the "predictable arts", such as mechanical inventions and software inventions, very little description is required. A mere flow chart of a piece of software, for example, is adequate. Source code is not normally required. In the “unpredictable arts”, such as chemistry and pharmaceuticals, a very detailed description is required.

In 1988 Federal Circuit established 8 Wands factors that can be considered when determining whether a disclosure requires undue experimentation:

1. the quantity of experimentation necessary;
2. the amount of direction or guidance presented;
3. the presence or absence of working examples;
4. the nature of the invention;
5. the state of the prior art;
6. the relative skill of those in the art;
7. the predictability or unpredictability of the art; and
8. the breadth of the claims.

In a 2005 U.S. court case, several of Jerome H. Lemelson patents covering bar code readers were held to be invalid because the specification was not complete enough for a person of ordinary skill in the art of electrical engineering to have made and used the claimed invention at the time the patent was filed (1954) without undue experimentation. In this case the court held that a person of ordinary skill in the art was a degreed electrical engineer with two years of experience as of the filing date of the original patent application, 1954. One of the challenges of this court case, which was decided in 2005, was to find experts on the state of the art who were alive in 1954.

In May 2023, the U.S. Supreme Court did not specifically address the eight Wands factors in its decision in Amgen Inc v. Sanofi. However, the Court stated that the specification may call for a reasonable amount of experimentation to make and use the full scope of the claimed invention.

==== Written description and possession ====
In the United States, the would-be patentee must provide a "written description" of the invention, sufficient to support the claims of the patent during the patent's examination. "Written description" determines the scope of claims.

The purpose of this rule is to avoid applicants speculatively filing for patents for inventions that they have not yet invented in order to get priority over competitors. As the Federal Circuit explained in Amgen Inc. v. Hoechst Marion Roussel, Inc. 314 F.3d 1313, 1330 (Fed. Cir. 2003), "[t]he purpose of the written description requirement is to prevent an applicant from later asserting that he invented that which he did not."

An illustrative landmark decision on the issue of "written description" was University of Rochester v. Searle, related to patents on COX-2 inhibitors. In the early 1990s scientists at the University of Rochester discovered two disctinct cyclooxygenases, referred to as COX-1 and COX-2. For most patents it is desirable to inhibit COX-2 and not COX-1. Previously known NSAIDs inhibit both COX-1 and COX-2, and thus they not only reduce inflammation, but also cause side effects such as stomach upset, irritation, ulcers, and bleeding. This breakthrough discovery prompted the Rochester scientists to launch a program for developing selective COX-2 inhibitors, and they developed an assay to screen for such inhibitors, which was a subject of patent US5837479 issued in 1998, that claimed methods "for identifying a compound that inhibits prostaglandin synthesis catalyzed by mammalian prostaglandin H synthase-2 (PGHS-2)." While disclosing the discovery of the target enzyme (which is an unpatentable product of Nature) and the methods for identifying its inhibitors, the US5837479 did not provide any specific formulas for the claimed inhibitors. "Accordingly, the court concluded that the patent's claims are invalid for lack of written description," because "it claims a method of achieving a biological effect, but discloses no compounds that can accomplish that result."

To summarize: without the written description/sufficiency of disclosure requirement, an applicant might delay scientific and technical progress by blocking competitors from inventing something that the applicant has not yet invented (i.e. did not describe in his patent application). The written description requirement thus reinforces the idea that patents are a reward for inventing by requiring the applicant to show they possess the invention.

==== Deposit of biological material ====
Biological (i.e. "capable of self-replication either directly or indirectly") materials (such as yeast, algae, protozoa, eukaryotic cells, cell lines, hybridomas, plasmids, viruses, plant tissue cells, lichens, seeds, vectors, cell organelles etc.) can be patented in the US as compositions of matter or as articles of manufacture, provided that they are useful, novel and non-obvious. However, a precise description (such as molecular structure) is not always possible in such cases, which makes it difficult to meet written description and enablement requirements for claims involving biological materials. One option to claim such biological inventions is by using plant patents. Another option is to use regular utility patents in combination with a deposit of the claimed biological material according to Budapest Treaty of 1977. The US law allows for such biological deposit(s) to be made at any time before the patent issuance (and in some cases during reexamination), however many other countries require deposits before patent filing. Such deposits are typically made for 30 years.

==== Best mode ====
In the United States, the sufficiency of disclosure requirement is complemented by an additional requirement, generally not found in other national patent jurisdictions: the "best mode requirement". According to the requirement, the disclosure must also contain the inventor's "best mode" of making or practising the invention. For example, if an inventor knows that a liquid should be heated to 250 degrees for optimal performance, but discloses in the patent that the liquid should be heated to "above 200 degrees", then the inventor has not disclosed his "best mode" for carrying out the invention. The best mode must be disclosed for the entire invention, and not only its innovative aspects.

The purpose of the “best mode” requirement is to ensure full disclosure, such that the inventor may not “disclose only what he knows to be his second-best embodiment, retaining the best for himself.”

The "best mode requirement" only applies to what the inventor knows at the time the application is filed, not to what is subsequently discovered.

Post-AIA, US law no longer permits invalidation of a US patent for failure to disclose the best mode, although technically the best mode is still required to be disclosed by the language of 35 U.S.C. Section 112.

== See also ==
- Incredible utility
- Reduction to practice
- Sufficiency of disclosure in Canadian patent law
