= Projector (patent) =

Original true inventor in US patent law

Projector is a 19th-century term in United States patent law meaning the original true inventor. "True inventor" at the time meant the first inventor to reduce an invention to practice.

As a synonym for promoter, e.g. in the phrase "railway projectors", the term was used in a derogatory fashion in a 1790 document. In that discussion of needed changes in the patent act, 'projector' described someone who overzealously promotes an invention.

== See also ==
- Corporate promoter
- Inventor (patent)
- Patent medicine
- Patent troll
