= Derivation proceeding =

US patent law procedure

In United States patent law since the 2011 Leahy-Smith America Invents Act (AIA), a derivation proceeding is a trial proceeding under 35 U.S.C. § 135 conducted at the Patent Trial and Appeal Board to determine whether (i) an inventor named in an earlier patent application derived the claimed invention from an inventor named in the petitioner's application, and (ii) the earlier application claiming such invention was filed without authorization. Derivation proceedings are only applicable to applications for patent, and any patent issuing thereon, that are subject to the first-inventor-to-file provisions of the AIA. This is in contrast to an interference proceeding under pre-AIA law, which determined the priority of invention.

An applicant subject to the first-inventor-to-file provisions may file a petition to institute a derivation proceeding with the Board. During the derivation proceeding, the Board has jurisdiction over any involved patent or application, and the patent examiner may not act thereon except as the Board may authorize.
