= Kelner v Baxter =

UK company law case (1866)

- Court: Court of Common Pleas
- Decided: 14 November 1866
- Citation: (1866) LR 2 CP 174

Court membership
- Judges sitting: Erle CJ, Willes J, Byles J, Keating J

Kelner v Baxter (1866) LR 2 CP 174 is a UK company law case, concerning pre incorporation contracts.

== Facts ==
A group of company promoters for a new hotel business entered into a contract, purportedly on behalf of the company which was not yet registered, to purchase wine. Once the company was registered, it ratified the contract. However, the wine was consumed before the money was paid, and the company went into liquidation. The promoters, as agents, were sued on the contract. They argued that liability under the contract had passed, by ratification, to the company and that they were hence not personally liable. It was held, however, that as the company did not exist at the time of the agreement it would be wholly inoperative unless it was binding on the promoters personally and a stranger cannot by subsequent ratification relieve them from that responsibility.

On the other hand, a promoter can avoid personal liability if the company, after incorporation, and the third party substitutes the original pre-incorporation contract with a new contract on similar terms. Novation, as this is called, may also be inferred by the conduct of the parties such as where the terms of the original agreement are changed.

A promoter can also avoid personal liability on a contract where he signs the agreement merely to confirm the signature of the company because in so doing he has not held himself out as either agent or principal. The signature and the contractual document will be a complete nullity because the company was not in existence (Newborne v Sensolid (Great Britain) Ltd [1954] 1 QB 45).

== Judgment ==
Erle CJ held the promoters were personally liable. He said the following.

I agree that if the Gravesend Royal Alexandra Hotel Company had been an existing company at this time, the persons who signed the agreement would have signed as agents of the company. But, as there was no company in existence at the time, the agreement would be wholly inoperative unless it were held to be binding on the defendants personally.

== See also ==
- UK company law
