= Reexamination =

Legal procedure related to patents

In United States patent law, a reexamination is a process whereby anyone—third party or inventor—can have a U.S. patent reexamined by a patent examiner to verify that the subject matter it claims is patentable. To have a patent reexamined, an interested party must submit prior art, in the form of patents or printed publications, that raises a "substantial new question of patentability". The Leahy-Smith America Invents Act makes substantial changes to the U.S. patent system, including new mechanisms for challenging patents at the U.S. Patent and Trademark Office. One of the new mechanisms is a post-grant review proceeding, which will provide patent challengers expanded bases on which to attack patents.

== Process ==
A request for a reexamination can be filed by anyone at any time during the period of enforceability of a patent. To request a reexamination, one must submit a "request for reexamination" which includes (1) a statement pointing out each "substantial new question of patentability based on prior patents and printed publications; (2) an identification and explanation for every claim for which reexamination is requested; (3) a copy of every patent or printed publication relied upon; (4) a copy of the entire patent at issue; (5) a certification that a copy of the request for reexamination has been served on the patent owner if the requester is not the patent owner; and (6) a certification by the third-party requester that the statutory estoppel provisions of 35 U.S.C. 351(e)(1) or 35 U.S.C. 325(e)(1) do not prohibit the requester from filing the request for reexamination. If the USPTO finds that the request indeed raises a substantial new question of patentability, the USPTO orders a reexamination.

Requests for reexamination are often filed by third parties, who are already involved in an infringement lawsuit concerning the patent at issue. By filing for a reexamination, such parties seek to invalidate the patent while keeping legal fees low. If the judge agrees, the trial proceedings may be put on hold pending the outcome of the reexamination.

Inventors themselves also file requests for reexamination. Such requests may be filed before the inventors sue another party for infringing the patent, to make sure that the patent is valid in light of any prior art they may have discovered since the issuance of the patent.

The patent office itself may initiate "director initiated" reexaminations, for example, when there is reason to question the validity of the patent. The director, for example, ordered reexaminations of the NTP, Inc. patents which covered BlackBerry mobile e-mail technology.

Once a reexamination is ordered, a new examiner is assigned to the case, and the patent goes through another examination similar to the examination it received the first time around. If any claims are rejected in light of the new questions raised, then the patent owner can narrow or cancel those claims. The patent owner can also submit new claims, provided they are not broader than the claims in the original patent. If the examiner makes a rejection "final", the patent owner can appeal the decision to the Board of Patent Appeals and Interferences (BPAI) at the USPTO. The patent owner can file an appeal to the Court of Appeals for the Federal Circuit and even to the US Supreme Court, if permitted.

Once the reexamination has been concluded, a "certificate of reexamination" is issued. The certificate makes any corrections to a patent as are required under the reexamination. If all the claims in the patent are rejected, the patent gets nullified. As of January 2, 2001, certificates of reexamination have a kind code in the series C1, C2, C3, .... Before then, kind code was in the series B1, B2, B3, ....

== Public notice ==
The proceedings of all reexaminations are made available to the public on the USPTO's public PAIR (Patent Application Information Retrieval) web site. Reexaminations are assigned serial numbers and cross referenced as child applications of originally issued patents.

The process of reexamination has the potential to increase the quality of patents issued and to encourage public input in the process.

== Ex parte and inter partes reexaminations ==
Ex parte reexaminations are initiated by members of the public, but once said members submit their request, they no longer actively participate in the proceedings. The correspondence is strictly between the examiner and the patent owner. The fee for filing a request for an ex parte reexamination is $6,000 as of January 16, 2018.

Inter partes reexaminations were initiated by members of the public, and said members of the public then participated in the proceedings. On September 16, 2012, Leahy-Smith America Invents Act eliminated these proceedings and replaced them with two new post grant proceedings (Post-Grant Review and Inter Partes Review).

Duplicate requests for Inter partes reexaminations by the same requesting party are prohibited under 35 U.S.C. § 317.

== Statistics ==
747 requests for ex parte reexaminations were filed in FY2012 (corresponding to about 0.28% of the total number of patents issued that year), though roughly 90% of these requests were made by the patent owner. Some 640 requests for inter partes reexaminations were filed during FY2012, a figure that has been rising substantially every year and a fourfold increase since FY2008.

Statistics released by the USPTO for reexaminations for the period of 1981 to 2007 showed that for ex parte reexaminations, claims were changed in average 64% of the cases. In 26% of the cases, all claims are confirmed with no changes, while in 10% of the cases, all claims were invalidated. For inter partes reexaminations, claims were changed in seven of the eight cases that had been completed by the time the statistics were released.

== Notable reexaminations ==
=== NTP patents ===
The NTP patents covering BlackBerry technology are currently undergoing a number of reexaminations because new prior art has been discovered which had not been considered by the patent office when the patent applications were first examined. Some of these reexaminations are inter partes, some of them are ex parte, some of them were initiated by the director. Some of the patents have had a number of reexaminations filed. These multiple reexaminations have been merged into single reexaminations, each for the patent in question.

As of April 2006, all of the NTP claims that have been acted upon have been rejected on the basis of the substantial new questions of patentability. It is not yet known whether NTP will narrow its claims to get around the rejections, or succeed in an appeal. Blackberry agreed, on March 3, 2006, to settle its patent dispute with NTP for more than 600 million US$.

=== Method for swinging on a swing ===
U.S. patent 6,368,227 entitled "Method of swinging on a swing" was issued in 2002 to applicant Steven Olson, the young son of a patent attorney who applied for the patent to teach his son about the patent system. This patent was filed shortly after business method patents became allowable under the US patent law due to the 1998 State Street decision; it was not, however, a business method, but rather simply a method or process patent. The patent claimed an improved method for a child to swing on a swing.

The PTO director ordered a reexamination, and the claims were subsequently rejected. The patent owner elected not to appeal. A reexamination certificate was issued canceling all the claims.

=== Crustless peanut butter and jelly sandwich ===
U.S. patent 6,004,596 entitled "Sealed crustless sandwich" was issued in 1999 to applicants Len Kretchman and David Gesked. The patent claimed an improved crustless peanut butter and jelly sandwich, which could be mass-produced and sold in stores.

The patent was licensed to Smuckers, which then introduced the Uncrustables brand of frozen no-crust sandwiches. Smuckers invested about $20 million to build a factory in Scottsville, Kentucky to produce the product. Its annual sales in 2005 were $US 60 million.

To enforce the patent, Smuckers filed a patent infringement lawsuit against alleged infringer, Albie's Foods. Albie's Foods responded by filing a request for ex parte reexamination.

The examiner rejected the claims in the patent, and the rejection had been appealed to the BPAI. The BPAI rejected the claims, and in 2006, the USPTO issued a Notice of Intent to Issue a Reexam Certificate, which was subsequently issued in 2007 cancelling all claims of the patent. In 2008 the patent lapsed due to the patent owner not paying the renewal fee.

== See also ==
- Interference proceeding (U.S. patent law)
- Opposition procedure before the European Patent Office
- Scire facias
