= Lab notebook =

Primary record of research

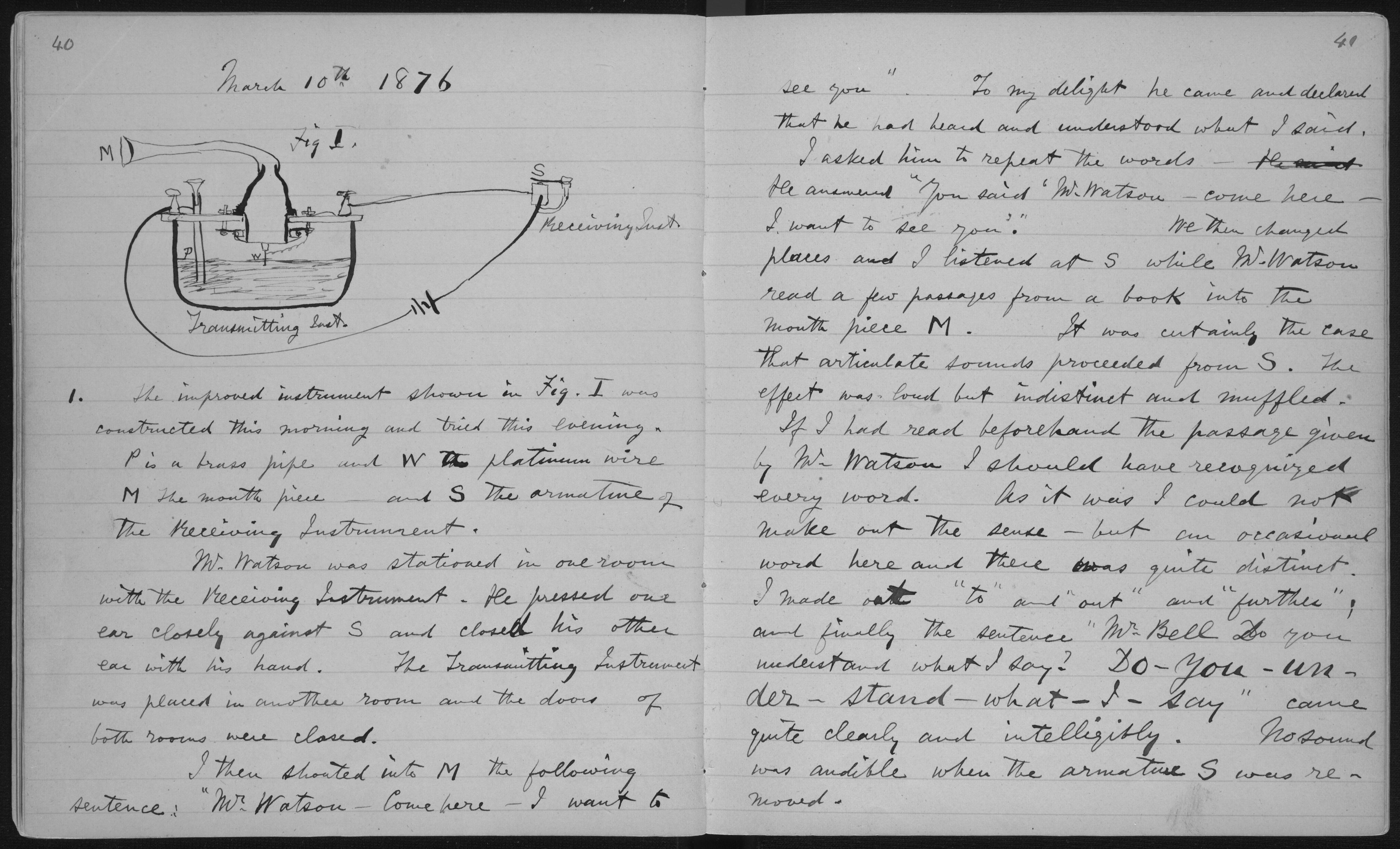
Page from a laboratory notebook of Alexander Graham Bell, 1876

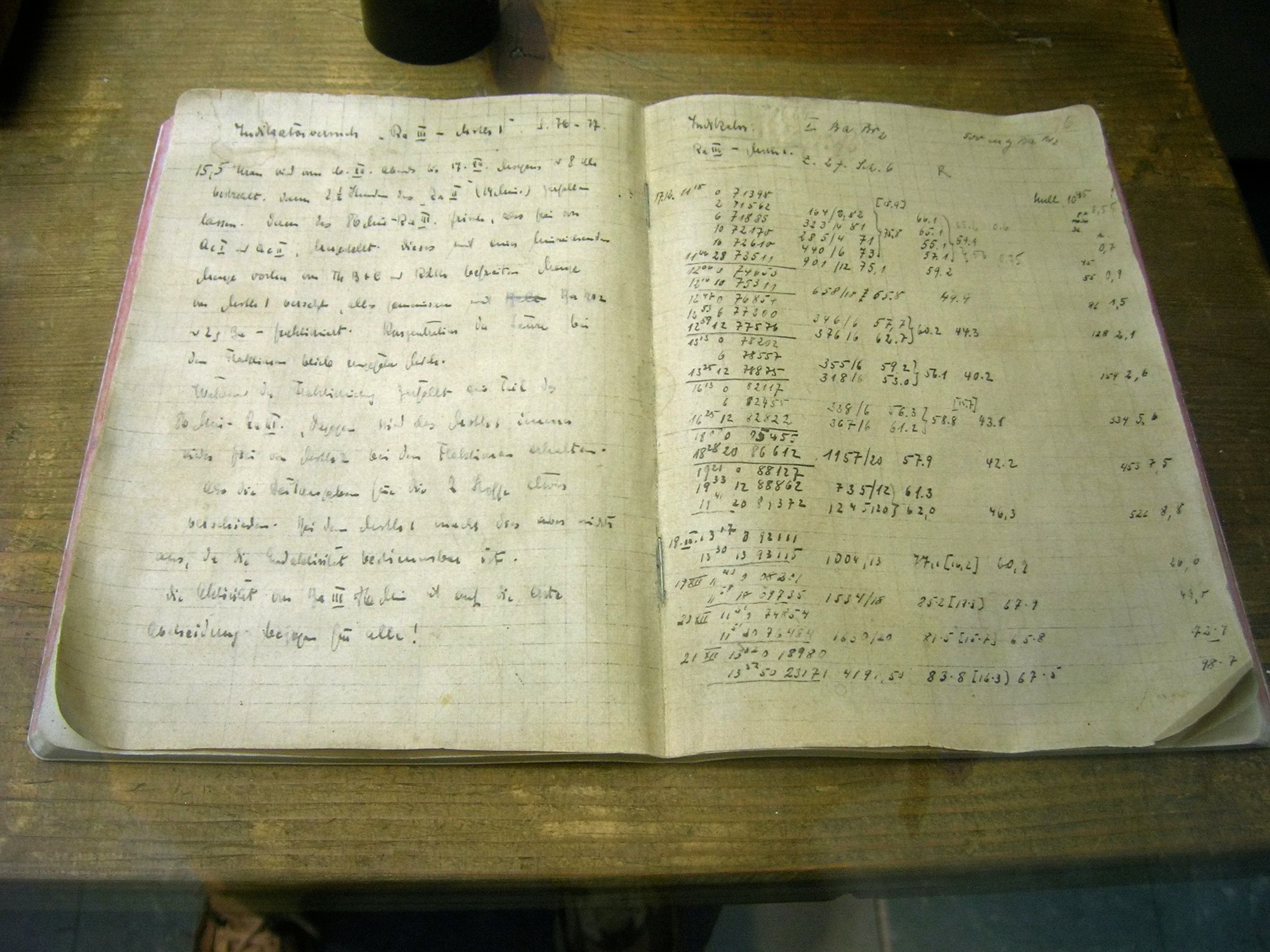
Page from the notebook of Otto Hahn, 1938

Lab notebook with the complete record of the experiments underlying a published paper

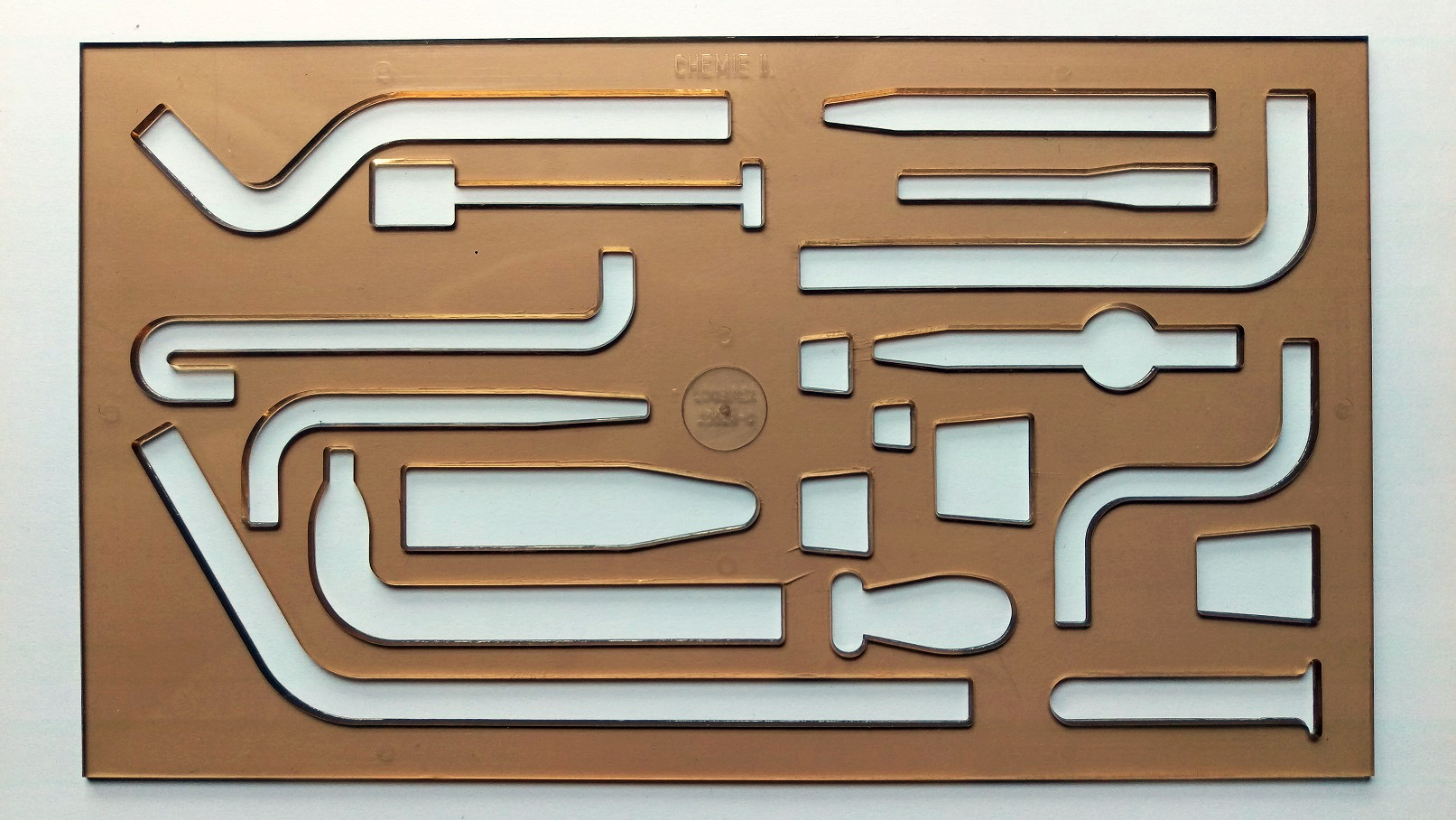
Chemistry stencils that used to be used for drawing equipment in lab notebooks

A laboratory notebook (colloq. lab notebook or lab book) is a primary record of research. Researchers use a lab notebook to document their hypotheses, experiments and initial analysis or interpretation of these experiments. The notebook serves as an organizational tool, a memory aid, and can also have a role in protecting any intellectual property that comes from the research.

== Structure ==
The guidelines for lab notebooks vary widely between institution and between individual labs, but some guidelines are fairly common, for example, like those in the reference. The lab notebook is typically permanently bound and pages are numbered. Dates are given as a rule. All entries are with a permanent writing tool, e.g., a ballpoint pen (though a permanent marker may be undesirable, as the ink might bleed through multiple pages). The lab notebook is usually written as the experiments progress, rather than at a later date. In many laboratories, it is the original place of record of data (no copying is carried out from other notes) as well as any observations or insights. For data recorded by other means (e.g., on a computer), the lab notebook will record that the data was obtained and the identification of the data set will be given in the notebook. Many adhere to the concept that a lab notebook should be thought of as a diary of activities that are described in sufficient detail to allow another scientist to replicate the steps. In laboratories with several staff and a common laboratory notebook, entries in the notebook are signed by those making them.

== Legal aspects ==
To ensure that data cannot be easily altered, notebooks with permanently bound pages are often recommended. Researchers are often encouraged to write only with unerasable pen, to sign and date each page, and to have their notebooks inspected periodically by another scientist who can read and understand it. All of these guidelines can be useful in proving exactly when a discovery was made, in the case of a patent dispute. However following March 2013, lab notebooks are of limited legal use in the United States, due to a change in the law that grants patents to the first person to file, rather than the first person to invent. The lab notebook is still useful for proving that work was not stolen, but can no longer be used to dispute the patent of an unrelated party.

== Electronic formats ==
Several companies now offer electronic lab notebooks. This format has gained some popularity, especially in large pharmaceutical companies, which have large numbers of researchers and great need to document their experiments.

== Open lab notebooks ==
Lab notebooks kept online have started to become as transparent to the world as they are to the researcher keeping them, a trend often referred to as Open Notebook Science, after the title of a 2006 blogpost by chemist Jean-Claude Bradley. The term is frequently used to distinguish this aspect of Open Science from the related but rather independent developments commonly labeled as open source, open access, open data and so forth. The openness of the notebook, then, specifically refers to the set of the following points, or elements thereof:

1. Sharing of the researcher's laboratory notebook online in real time without password protection or limitations on the use of the data.
2. The raw data used by the researcher to derive observations and conclusions are made available online to anyone.
3. All experimental data are shared, including failed or ambiguous attempts.
4. Feedback and other contributions to the research effort can be integrated easily with the understanding that everything is donated to the public domain.

The use of a wiki makes it convenient to track contributions by individual authors.

== See also ==
- Exercise book
- Fieldnotes
- Ruled paper
- Graph paper
- Invention disclosure
- Inventor's notebook
- Laboratory information management system
