= Amgen Inc v. Sanofi =

Amgen, Inc. v. Sanofi
- Supreme Court of the United States

Argued March 27, 2023 Decided May 18, 2023
- Full case name: Amgen, Inc., et al. v. Sanofi, et al
- Docket no.: 21-757
- Citations: 598 U.S. 594 (more)
- Argument: Oral argument
- Opinion announcement: Opinion announcement

Holding
- Petitioner Amgen’s two patent applications—purporting to cover all antibodies that bind and block the PCSK9 receptor involved in LDL cholesterol metabolism—fail to satisfy the Patent Act’s enablement clause.

Court membership
- Chief Justice John Roberts Associate Justices Clarence Thomas · Samuel Alito; Sonia Sotomayor · Elena Kagan; Neil Gorsuch · Brett Kavanaugh; Amy Coney Barrett · Ketanji Brown Jackson

Case opinion
- Majority: Gorsuch, joined by unanimous

Laws applied
- Patent Act of 1952

Amgen Inc. v. Sanofi, 598 U.S. 594 (2023), is a United States Supreme Court case in which the Court held that Amgen's two patent applications on cholesterol-lowering drugs failed to satisfy the enablement clause of §112 of the Patent Act, 35 U.S.C. § 112(a).

== Background ==
In 2014, Amgen sued Sanofi for infringing Amgen's patents on antibodies that lower LDL cholesterol, sometimes called “bad” cholesterol.

Amgen held two patents for antibodies that bind to specific amino acids on PCSK9, a protein involved in regulating LDL cholesterol. These antibodies were claimed to block PCSK9 from impairing the body's mechanism for removing LDL cholesterol from the bloodstream. Sanofi argued these patents failed to meet the enablement standard set by §112 of the Patent Act. This statute requires a patent applicant to describe their invention ““in such full, clear, concise, and exact terms as to enable any person skilled in the art” to make and use the invention.”

In August 2019, the United States District Court for the District of Delaware granted Sanofi judgment as a matter of law, concluding that the claims at issue “are not enabled.” The United States Court of Appeals for the Federal Circuit affirmed.

Subsequently, Amgen appealed to the Supreme Court. The Court granted certiorari on November 4, 2022 and heard oral arguments from Amgen and Sanofi and US Department of Justice (amicus curiae) on March 27, 2023.

Various individuals and organizations filed amicus curiae briefs.

== Opinion of the Court ==
In a unanimous opinion delivered Justice Gorsuch on May 18, 2023, the Supreme Court sided with Sanofi and affirmed the lower courts’ decisions.

The Court held that Amgen's patents were invalid for lack of enablement and described little more than a "research assignment." The two patents purported to claim “the entire genus” of antibodies. If a patent claims an entire class of processes, machines, manufactures, or compositions of matter, its specification must enable a person skilled in the art to make and use the entire class. “The claims before us sweep much broader than those 26 antibodies. And we agree with the lower courts that Amgen has failed to enable all that it has claimed, even allowing for a reasonable degree of experimentation.” In other words, Amgen did not provide adequate details for an expert in the field to reproduce and apply the inventions.

In confirming the existing enablement standard, the Court emphasized that “the more a party claims, the broader the monopoly it demands, the more it must enable.” In other words, a patent claim is not enabled unless every species covered by the claim is described in the patent. The Court made clear, however, that a patent specification need not describe "with particularity how to make and use every single embodiment within a claimed class." “Nor is a specification necessarily inadequate just because it leaves the skilled artist to engage in some measure of adaptation or testing.”

== Subsequent developments ==
On January 10, 2024, the United States Patent and Trademark Office (USPTO) issued guidelines for evaluating enablement under 35 U.S.C. 112(a) in light of the Supreme Court decision. These guidelines state that USPTO will continue to use the eight In re Wands factors to ascertain whether the amount of experimentation required to enable the full scope of the claimed invention is reasonable.
