= Sufficiency of disclosure in Canadian patent law =

In Canada, every patent application must include the “specification”. The patent specification has three parts: the disclosure, the claims, and the abstract. The contents of the specification are crucial in patent litigation.

== Components of the specification ==
=== Disclosure requirements ===
The requirements of disclosure are set out in s. 27 of the Patent Act:

(3) The specification of an invention must

(a) correctly and fully describe the invention and its operation or use as contemplated by the inventor;

(b) set out clearly the various steps in a process, or the method of constructing, making, compounding or using a machine, manufacture or composition of matter, in such full, clear, concise and exact terms as to enable any person skilled in the art or science to which it pertains, or with which it is mostly closely connected, to make, construct, compound or use it;

(c) in the case of a machine, explain the principle of the machine and the best mode in which the inventor has contemplated the application of that principle; and

(d) in the case of a process, explain the necessary sequence, if any, of the various steps, so as to distinguish the invention from other inventions

In the disclosure, the applicant explains what his or her invention is and how to put it to use.

- For a product, this means that the disclosure must show how to make and use the invention.
- For a new combination, the elements of and result of the combination must be detailed.
- For a machine, the inventor must indicate the principle of the invention and the best mode of applying it.

The sufficiency of the disclosure, with any valid amendments made to it, is judged at the patent's claim date. The disclosure must be fair, honest, open and sufficient. If a person skilled in the art can arrive at the same results only through chance or further long experiments, the disclosure is insufficient and the patent is void. The disclosure must give skilled readers enough information for them to easily use the invention when the patent expires, and for them to try to improve on or experiment with it in the meanwhile. Thus, a patent holder who holds back essential information invalidates the whole patent. The disclosure would also be insufficient if it is simply wrong and a person skilled in the art cannot use the disclosure or her general ability to replicate the invention. If a person skilled in the art would readily spot the mistake or omission and quickly correct it by using common general knowledge and the rest of the patent, but without "prolonged research, inquiry or experiment" or inventiveness, then this will not invalidate a patent.

==== Best mode ====
As part of their duty of full disclosure and good faith, inventors must reveal their best mode, or "preferred embodiment", of using the invention, even if that mode is not claimed in the patent application. The mode must be the best one the inventor knows at the claim date, and must be well enough disclosed for other skilled workers to practice it without undue experiment.

When read literally, the Act provides a best mode duty only for machines (see above Patent Act at s 27(3)(c)). This led one court to recently confine the doctrine to machines while admitting that "common sense and fair play" would extend this duty to all inventions. Some authors such as Professor Vaver argue that this revisionism seems wrong given prior case law and the Supreme Court of Canada's decision in Consolboard Inc. v. MacMillan Bloedel (Saskatchewan) Ltd. which recognized that the Act's disclosure provision is badly drafted and cannot be read literally.

=== The claims ===
The claims are a mandatory part of the specification through s. 27(4) of the Patent Act which states:

[t]he specification must end with a claim or claims defining distinctly and in explicit terms the subject-matter of the invention for which an exclusive privilege or property is claimed".

Thus, the claims require the patent applicant to stake out the monopoly sought. Claims are sometimes analogized as a series of "fences" surrounding and protecting the valuable invention.

Anything outside the fence is public domain: "what is not claimed is disclaimed." Since each claim is an independent grant of monopoly, one or more may be found invalid without necessarily affecting the validity of any other. This system leads inevitably to inventors claiming the broadest interpretation possible of what their invention is, and progressively claim narrower variations.

In order to determine whether a claim is infringed or invalid, the Court will read the claims and give them a meaning through a process referred to as "claim construction". As Professor Vaver explains, trying to estimate the outcome of claim construction is next to impossible:

Predicting how a court will assess the technology and conflicting expert evidence on meaning and then figure out a claim's "true" meaning is close to soothsaying - or, as one court put it less succinctly, "an intracranial iterative process, involving multiple factors, including natural meaning, documentary context, technical considerations, commercial context, and business common sense.

Thus, the game for patent holders is to reveal as little as possible, while claiming as much as possible. The less that is disclosed, the more that can be retained and serve as a competitive edge. The wider the claims, the tougher it is for competitors not to infringe, however, the patent holder must avoid the known and the obvious or risk patent invalidity. (Note: The case Professor Vaver was quoting from is Fabio Perini SPA v. LPC Group Plc [2010] EWCA Civ 525 at para 24)

=== The abstract ===
The abstract section summarizes the invention's purpose. The abstract should describe the technical problem and the solution of the problem by the invention in a succinct way so that a reader can decide whether the rest of the patent is of interest.

== Unity of invention ==
The general rule is "one invention, one application, one patent". However, multiple claims covering all facets are allowed in the same patent if a "single inventive concept" links them. If more than one invention is disclosed, the application can be split into two or more "divisional applications", each claiming the requisite one invention. One invention does not become two inventions just because it is contained in another product. Professor Vaver provides the following example to illustrate the point:

a compact automobile is not separately patentable just because it houses a myriad of independent inventions that contribute to its compact nature.

If there is more than one invention, the patent office can insist on division or the applicant may divide on his or her own initiative. A wrong decision by an applicant can cause severe problems and may even risk invalidation of the patent(s).

== Examination ==
In Canada, a specialized examiner will check the specification against the documents in the patent office's extensive library and other public sources, and decide whether a patent should be granted. Anything that would invalidate an issued patent bars the initial grant. As Professor Vaver explains:

All aspects of patentability are checked: Is this an “invention”? Is it new, unobvious, useful? Does the application fully disclose the invention? Do the claims fairly reflect the invention, or are they too broad? Is there perhaps a common law or Charter bar to the grant.

All patent offices see their job as granting, not rejecting, patents. Thus, an examiner's objections are directed at ensuring that a valid patent issue. The patent office can reject an application only if it is positively satisfied that the applicant is not by law entitled to a patent. This is a result of s. 40 of the Patent Act which states:

Whenever the Commissioner is satisfied that an applicant is not by law entitled to be granted a patent, he shall refuse the application and, by registered letter addressed to the applicant or his registered agent, notify the applicant of the refusal and of the ground or reason therefor

The non-discretionary nature of the Commissioner's duty was confirmed in Monsanto Canada Inc. v. Schmeiser where Pigeon J., after citing s. 40 stated:

I have underlined by law [in s. 42] to stress that this is not a matter of discretion: the Commissioner has to justify any refusal. As Duff C.J. said in Vanity Fair Silk Mills v. Commissioner of Patents (at p. 246):

No doubt the Commissioner of Patents ought not to refuse an application for a patent unless it is clearly without substantial foundation. . . . [Emphasis in original.]

An applicant may overcome objections to the application by argument or amendment. If the examiner is satisfied, the application is allowed and a patent is issued. If the examiner is not satisfied, the examiner will issue a final action letter, with reasons for rejecting the application. A rejection can be appealed to a Patent Appeal Board comprising senior patent office examiners. Applicants unsuccessfel at the Patent Appeal Board can appeal directly to the Federal Court and ultimately the Supreme Court of Canada.

== Truthful application ==
In Canadian patent applications, a distinction is drawn between specifications and drawings, and the petition itself through s. 53 of the Patent Act which states:

(1) A patent is void if any material allegation in the petition of the applicant in respect of the patent is untrue, or if the specification and drawings contain more or less than is necessary for obtaining the end for which they purport to be made, and the omission or addition is wilfully made for the purpose of misleading

(2) Where it appears to a court that the omission or addition referred to in subsection (1) was an involuntary error and it is proved that the patentee is entitled to the remainder of his patent, the court shall render a judgment in accordance with the facts, and shall determine the costs, and the patent shall be held valid for that part of the invention described to which the patentee is so found to be entitled.

Thus, the Act stipulates that the specifications and drawings should contain only what is needed to describe, disclose, and exemplify the inventions. Any omissions or additions made wilfully “for the purpose of misleading” invalidate the patent. Innocent errors in the specifications and drawings thus appear not to invalidate an entire patent.

The petition for a patent must be truthful in that a false “material allegation” invalidates the patent. This requirement applies only to false allegations in the petition itself. Misstatements elsewhere are excluded, although a misstatement elsewhere may invalidate a patent for other reasons related to patentability such as insufficient disclosure or a lack of utility.

== Bibliography ==
- Vaver, David (2011), Intellectual Property Law: Copyright, Patents, Trade-Marks (2nd ed.), Toronto: Irwin Law, ISBN 978-1-55221-209-7
