= Invention disclosure =

An invention disclosure, or invention disclosure report, is a confidential document written by a scientist or engineer for use by a company's patent department, or by an external patent attorney, to determine whether patent protection should be sought for the described invention. The invention disclosure may then be used as primary input for preparing a patent application. It may follow a standardized form established within a company. In that context, the abbreviation 'IDF' is often used to refer the "invention disclosure form" and, by extension, to the invention disclosure itself.

== See also ==
- Inventor's notebook
- Lab notebook
  - Electronic lab notebook
- Laboratory information management system
- LEDES invention disclosure data format
- Scientific management
