= Corporate promoter =

Doer of preliminary work related to the formation of a company

A corporate promoter is a firm or person who does the preliminary work related to the formation of a company, including its promotion, incorporation, and flotation, and solicits people to invest money in the company, usually when it is being formed. An investment banker, an underwriter, or a stock promoter may, wholly or in part, perform the role of a promoter. Promoters generally owe a duty of utmost good faith, so as to not mislead any potential investors, and disclose all material facts about the company's business. An earlier term for such a person is projector.

== Fiduciary duties ==
Generally, promoters are in a fiduciary relationship with the company and its investors and shareholders, and must avoid conflicts of interests and exercise reasonable care in performing their duties. They must refrain from self-dealing or other types of abuse to take advantage of their position as a promoter. Self-dealing occurs, for example, when a promoter unfairly profits from the conduct of business with the company by charging higher prices for the goods they sell to the company than it would otherwise pay.

A promoter can be a shareholder in the promoted company. If the promoter is the only shareholder, the company may, in compliance with the rule of the United States Securities and Exchange Commission (SEC) and similar rules in other jurisdictions, need to disclose the information prior to selling shares to the public.

The fiduciary duties of promoters include:

- not to make any secret profit out of the promotion of the company. Secret profit is made by entering into a transaction on their own behalf and then selling the concerned property to the company at a profit, without disclosing the profit to the company or its members. Promoters can make profits in dealings with the company, provided they discloses these profits to the company and its members.
- to make full disclosure to the company of all relevant facts, including any profit made by them in transactions with the company.

If a promoter fails to disclose the profits, made by him in the course of promotion or he knowingly makes a false statement in the prospectus, whereby the person relying on that statement, makes a loss, he will be liable to make good the loss, suffered by that other person. The promoter is liable for untrue statements, made in the prospectus.

A person, who subscribes for any shares or debenture in a company on the faith of the untrue statement contained in the prospectus, can sue the promoter for the loss or damages, sustained by the subscriber as the result of such untrue statement.

== Types of promoters ==
There are three types of Promoters:-

=== Occasional promoters ===
These promoters take interest in floating some companies. They are not engaged in promotion work on a regular basis. They take up the promotion of some company and once it is over they resume their original profession. For instance, engineers, lawyers etc. may float some companies.

=== Entrepreneur promoters ===
They are both promoters and entrepreneurs. They conceive the idea of a new business unit, do the groundwork to establish it and may subsequently become a part of the management.

=== Financial promoters ===
Some financial institutions, like investment banks or industrial banks, may take up the promotion of a company with a view to finding opportunities for investment.

== Functions of promoters ==
The functions of a promoter may include:

=== Discovery of a business idea ===
The first stage in company promotion is the generation of new ideas. It is the promoter who conceives the idea of setting up a business, and makes an assessment of the viability of a particular aspect within the business be it technical feasibility, financial feasibility, economic feasibility or incorporation of company.

=== Detailed investigation ===
Promoters undertake a detailed investigation of the viability, profitability and future prospects of the growth of the proposed activity, and may seek the help of specialists such as lawyers, accountants, cost accountants, a company secretary, and engineers. Organisations engaged in market research and other specialised agencies. Specialists are in a position to make an objective analysis of their own areas which may help the promoters. Decisions have to be taken regarding the size, location, layout, manpower etc.

=== Assembling the factors of production ===
If the proposed endeavour gives promise of success and the promoter is willing to undertake the risk of forming the business, step must be taken to assemble various factors of production, such as land, labour, capital and managerial personnel. Assembly of resources involves making contracts for the purchase of these resources. Promoters organise the resources to convert the idea into a reality by forming a company.

=== Entering into preliminary contracts ===
The promoter may enter into contracts with third parties in anticipation of the registration of a company; but after registration, the company must approve or confirm these contracts.

=== Naming a company ===
The promoter has to select a name of the company while selecting the name the promoter keeps in mind that the name should not be identical to the name of any other company.

== See also ==
- Projector (patent)
- Erlanger v New Sombrero Phosphate Co (1878) 3 App Cas 1218
