= Falana v. Kent State Univ. =

Falana v. Kent State University
- Court: United States Court of Appeals for the Federal Circuit
- Full case name: Olusegun Falana v. Kent State University and Alexander J. Seed
- Decided: January 23 2012
- Citations: 669 F.3d 1349; 101 U.S.P.Q.2d 1414

Court membership
- Judges sitting: Richard Linn, Sharon Prost, Jimmie V. Reyna

Case opinions
- Majority: Linn

Olusegun Falana v. Kent State University and Alexander J. Seed, 669 F.3d 1349 (Fed. Cir. 2012), was a notable case precedent in the United States patent law decided by United States Court of Appeals for the Federal Circuit in 2012 that deals with the questions of inventorship and attorney's fee shifting in patent lawsuits.

== Background ==
In January 1998 Kent State University hired Falana to develop new additives for liquid crystal displays. In March 1999, Falana developed a method for making a novel genus of chemical compounds and synthesized several new molecules using his method. Notably, Falana did not disclose his method publicly, thus this information was not available as a prior art to later filed patent applications. In September 1999, Falana left Kent State for another job. Dr. Seed continued the research and synthesized several more molecules using Falana's method, several of which turned out to be promising for the use in liquid crystal displays. In June 2000, Kent State and its spin-off (Kent Displays, Inc.) filed a provisional application for a US patent claiming compositions of matter comprising molecules prepared by Falana's method. After the patent eventually became issued and published in 2004, Falana learned about the omission of his name on the list of inventors. After Kent State failed to provide a satisfactory answer, Falana filed a complaint with the U.S. District Court for the Northern District of Ohio against Kent State University and the inventors named on U.S. Patent No. 6,830,789 seeking correction of inventorship under 35 U.S.C. § 256.

== District court ==
At the bench trial, the District Court concluded that Falana contributed to the conception of the claimed compositions –of-matter by developing a previously unknown method for their preparation and ordered the USPTO to correct the inventorship (the USPTO records as of 16 June 2016 are still not corrected at and the patent maintenance fee lapsed on December 14, 2012).

The District Court also found the case to be exceptional under 35 U.S.C. § 285 on three grounds: 1) that defendants engaged in inequitable conduct, 2) that they took an untenable position in defending this case, and 3) that their continued defense of this case in the face of testimony that lacked credibility and veracity was frivolous and bordered on bad faith and awarded attorney fees to Falana.

== Appeal ==
Kent State and other Defendants appealed to the CAFC and the case was decided on January 23, 2012. The CAFC affirmed the decisions of the District Court on both inventorship and attorney fees. The Federal Circuit found that where the method of synthesizing the claimed compound requires more than the exercise of ordinary skill in the art, the discovery of that method is as much a contribution to the compound as the discovery of the compound itself. It established a binding precedent that the conception a synthetic method can make a person an inventor on a composition-of-matter claim, even if the person did not actually make the compound in question but only developed a method for making the compound, provided that the method was not publicly known previously.

== Significance ==
This case was decided after an earlier 2001's Chou v. University of Chicago and had similar circumstances and outcome, suggesting that university faculty and administration need to be better educated on the principles of Intellectual Property Law. It also established a currently binding precedent in regard to joint inventorship and attorney fee-shifting in the US Patent Law. According to Google Scholar, it has been cited in 35 legal decisions of the U.S. federal court system by June 20, 2016, and 67 times by June 11, 2024.

== Similar cases ==
- Peter v. NantKwest, Inc. (2019)
