= Inventor (patent) =

Concept in patent law

In patent law, an inventor is the person, or persons in United States patent law, who contribute to the claims of a patentable invention. In some patent law frameworks, however, such as in the European Patent Convention (EPC) and its case law, no explicit, accurate definition of who exactly is an inventor is provided. The definition may slightly vary from one European country to another. Inventorship is generally not considered to be a patentability criterion under European patent law.

Under older U.S. case law, an inventor is the one with "intellectual domination" over the inventive process and not merely one who assists in its reduction to practice. In the contemporary U.S. patent law inventor is defined as the person, who "conceived a claim". The persons who only made prototypes or suggested improvements not claimed in a patent are not inventors.

As the patent application moves through an examination at the USPTO, the original application is usually split into two or more divisional patent applications, which may have different inventors, because of different claims in the applications, and therefore different people, who conceived the claims. Therefore, it is important to write down during the filing of the very first application for each claim, who conceived it.

"Joint inventors", or "co-inventors", exist when a patentable invention is the result of inventive work of more than one inventor. Joint inventors may exist even where one inventor contributed a majority of the work.

== Inventorship ==
=== European Patent Convention ===
Under the European Patent Convention (EPC), identifying the inventor of a given invention is theoretically very important since "[t]he right to a European patent (...) belong[s] to the inventor or his successor in title", according to the first-to-file principle. In practice however, the European Patent Office (EPO) never investigates whether the proposed inventor is indeed the true inventor. Indeed, "[f]or the purposes of proceedings before the [EPO], the applicant shall be deemed to be entitled to exercise the right to the European patent".

Court actions relating to the entitlement to the grant of a European patent must be brought before the national court which has the jurisdiction. The jurisdiction is determined in conformance with the "Protocol on Jurisdiction and the Recognition of Decisions in respect of the Right to the Grant of a European Patent" or, in short, the "Protocol on Recognition". Once a final decision is issued by a national court adjudging that the applicant is not entitled to the grant of a European patent, the procedure according to Article 61 EPC is applicable.

In contrast with U.S. patent law, the applicant for a European patent need not be the inventor. The right to the European patent may validly be transferred before the filing of the application, e.g. by contract, by inheritance, or as a consequence of the "employee's rights" as determined by the applicable national law. However, the inventor has the right to be mentioned as such before the EPO. The EPO does not verify the accuracy of the designation of the inventor. The inventor may waive its right to be mentioned as such in the European patent application and European patent specification.

Inventorship is traditionally not classified as a patentability criterion under European patent law, in contrast with U.S. patent law. However, inventorship can be relevant to patentability in Europe, although in only a limited way. Where a disclosure is made within 6 months preceding the filing date of a European patent application, the disclosure is not taken into consideration if it was due to, or in consequence of, an evident abuse in relation to the applicant or his legal predecessor. Thus the identity of the inventor (who is often the applicant, or their legal predecessor) can be of vital importance.

=== United States ===
In the United States, before the Leahy-Smith America Invents Act (AIA), the inventor or joint inventors had to be named as the applicants. However, under the AIA, that is no longer the only option. This requirement that a patent be issued in the name of the inventors is derived from the intellectual property clause of the United States Constitution Article I, Section 8, Clause 8):

The Congress shall have power . . . To promote the progress of science and useful arts, by securing for limited times to authors and inventors the exclusive right to their respective writings and discoveries. (emphasis added)

This clause has been traditionally interpreted as that exclusive right to an invention is originally vested with the individual inventor(s). Inventors' employer (or anyone else) can own the invention only as a result of an explicit written contract or license. Such contract may be signed before the invention is made (see hired to invent). The case law on inventorship is currently controlled in the US by three court precedents:

Chou v. University of Chicago (2001), Stanford University v. Roche Molecular Systems, Inc. (2011), and Falana v. Kent State Univ. (2012)

The status as an inventor dramatically alters parties' ability to capitalize on the invention.

An inventor is a party who conceived (not just contributed to the reduction-to-practice) at least one claim to a patent. The courts explain that "[t]he threshold question" of inventorship is "who conceived the invention." Courts recognize that invention is rarely a solitary endeavor. Therefore, conception and "intellectual domination" over an invention is important and "reduction to practice, per se, is irrelevant. One must contribute to the conception to be an inventor." For example, in 1991, consumer group Public Citizen sued the owners of the patent for use of the anti-retroviral compound AZT against HIV Aids, Burroughs-Wellcome. The plaintiffs claimed that several persons at the National Institutes of Health (NIH) who had contributed to the patentable subject matter were not named as "inventors." Controversially, the courts ultimately ruled that the original patent was valid, and no error had been made in excluding the NIH researchers whose work only 'confirmed' the invention.

Generally, conception is "the complete performance of the mental part of the inventive act", and "the formation in the mind of the inventor of a definite and permanent idea of the complete and operative invention as it is thereafter to be applied in practice.." (emphasis added). An idea is usually not "definite and permanent" or "complete" where changes result from experimentation. In this case, other individuals who contribute to the formation of the "definite and permanent" idea are co-inventors.

The naming of inventors is very important for the validity of the patent. Failing to name, or incorrectly identifying inventors, with deceptive intent, can result in a patent being held invalid or unenforceable for inequitable conduct. Ordinarily, the courts presume the named inventors are the inventors so long as there is no disagreement.

An inventor cannot opt out from being mentioned as such in a U.S. patent, even if the patent application was assigned before publication. Assignment of rights in a patent does not alter to whom the patent is actually issued. In fact, an assignee may only have an equitable interest in the patent until it is issued and then legal interest would transfer automatically. If the inventor is dead, insane, or otherwise legally incapacitated, refuses to execute an application, or cannot be found, an application may be made by someone other than the inventor.

An omitted inventor can file lawsuit to have his/her name added to the list of the inventors. Such cases arise very often in Universities: see, for example, Chou v University of Chicago and Olusegun Falana v. Kent State University and Alexander J. Seed.

In 2019–2020, the USPTO has grappled with the question of whether an artificial intelligence machine can be an inventor. In a recent patent application, the USPTO rejected artificial intelligence machines as inventors, but has also sought comments from the public. The American Intellectual Property Law Association has come out against a change in the law until the topic is better understood, but others have suggested temporary measures to collect relevant information until Congress takes up the issue.

== Compensation of inventors ==
There are many ways in which an inventor might be compensated for a patent. An inventor might bring the patented product to market under the protection of the monopoly created by the patent. The inventor may license a patent to another entity for an up-front fee, an ongoing royalty or other consideration. The inventor may also sell the patent outright. Henry Woodward, for example, sold his original US patent on the light bulb to Thomas Edison who then developed it into a commercially successful product.

Inventors who are employees of a company generally sell or assign their patent rights to the company they work for. The extent to which they are compensated will vary from jurisdiction to jurisdiction and may depend upon any prior employment agreements that are in place. Under Japanese patent law, for example, an employee is entitled to a “reasonable fee" for an invention. In 2006 Hitachi was ordered to pay an employee $US 1.6 million for an invention the employee made that was commercially valuable. In United States, however, an employee may have to sign over the rights to an invention without any special compensation. Germany has a law on employees' inventions providing strict rules concerning the transfer of rights to an invention to the employer. It also prescribes mandatory compensation of employees for inventions they make. This right to compensation cannot be waived in advance, i.e. before the employer is informed of an invention.

== See also ==
- Projector (patent)
