= Inter partes =

Legal term literally meaning "between the parties"

In law, inter partes (Law Latin for 'between the parties') is a legal term that can be distinguished from in rem, which refers to a legal action whose jurisdiction is based on the control of property, or ex parte, which refers to a legal action that is by a single party.

Lawsuits (or actions in executive agencies) in which all interested parties have been served with adequate notices and are given a reasonable opportunity to attend and to be heard are referred to as inter partes proceedings or hearings. When a judgment is given, subject to any right of appeal, it would be inconvenient if the same issues could be endlessly relitigated by the same parties and so they are all bound by the result. However, anyone who was not a party to those proceedings and can demonstrate a legitimate interest in reopening the issue is entitled to petition the court for the right to be heard. However, in some circumstances, the judgment is given in rem and so binds everyone, whether a party to the case or not.

Contracts can also be said to be inter partes and various laws can be relied upon to create and vest rights that exist only on an inter partes basis; they do not attach as an attribute to a person's status and so become in rem rights.

== Examples ==
- Opposition procedure before the European Patent Office
- Interference proceeding (US patent law)
- Inter partes reexamination in US patent law
- Inter partes review (U.S. patent law)
- Trademark Trial and Appeal Board Petitions

== See also ==
- ex parte
- in personam
- in rem
- Privity of contract
