= Submarine patent =

Patent with delayed publication

A submarine patent is a patent whose issuance and publication are intentionally delayed by the applicant for an artificially long pendency, which can be several years, or a decade. Analogous to a submarine, submarine patents could remain "under water" for long periods until they "emerge", surprising the relevant market and potential infringers. Persons or companies making use of submarine patents are sometimes referred to as patent pirates.

Typically, the submarine patent strategy requires a patent system where patent applications are not automatically published, and the patent term is measured from the grant date rather than the priority or filing date. In the United States, patent applications filed before November 2000 were not published and remained secret until they were granted.

The phrase is occasionally used more generally for any patent used in patent ambush.

Submarine patents are criticized for allowing inventors to delay the publication and issuance of their patents, creating uncertainty in the market and enabling them to enforce unexpected claims against competitors long after the technology has been widely adopted.

== Causes ==
"Prior to requiring the publication of [U.S. patent] applications, the public would not learn of a patent until after it issued, which is often several years after the application was filed. Some patentees took advantage of this practice to the extreme (with ‘‘submarine’’ patents), and intentionally delayed their patents issuance, and thus publication, of the patent for several years to allow potentially infringing industries to develop and expand, having no way to learn of the pending application."
—U.S. Committee on the Judiciary, 2008

After the United States signed the TRIPS Agreement of the WTO in 1995, the standard patent term of 20 years under United States patent law has been measured from the original filing or priority date, rather than (as was previously the case) the date of issuance. This has significantly reduced the previous potential for submarine patent practices. Some submarine patents may also result from pre-1995 filings that have yet to be granted and will remain unpublished until issuance. Submarine patents are also weaker in jurisdictions such as US Federal Courts, in which they may be considered to be a procedural laches: a delay in enforcing one's rights that causes those rights to be lost.

In the past, when the life of a U.S. patent was 17 years from the date it was granted, submarine patents could issue decades after the initial filing date. Therefore, an applicant for a U.S. patent could benefit by delaying the issuance, and thus expiration date, of a patent through the simple, but relatively costly, expedient of filing a succession of continuation applications. Some submarine patents emerged as much as 40 years after the date of filing of the corresponding application. During the extended prosecution period the claims of the patent could be modified to more closely match whatever technology or products had become the industry standard.

Prior to changes in US patent law in 1995 and 1999, the content of patent applications was kept secret during the patent approval phase. Currently, the majority of U.S. patent applications are published within 18 months of the filing date (35 U.S.C. 122). However, the applicant can explicitly certify that they do not intend to file a corresponding patent outside the U.S. at the time they file the patent, and keep the application secret. The applicant can change their mind within the first year, but the application is then published. For continuation applications which claim priority to a previously filed application, the publication is six months after the new filing date. The changes to U.S. patent law that introduced publication at 18 months also changed the duration of the patent to 20 years from the filing date of the earliest patent application in any chain of continuation patent applications. As a result, there is little benefit in postponing the grant of the patent. The enforceable life of the patent can no longer be shifted into the period when a technology has become more widely adopted, and the patent applicant must abandon the chance of foreign patent protection if he is to maintain patent secrecy beyond the 18-month period. In a 2006 report the National Academy of Sciences has recommended that "in all cases, applications should be published during patent examinations".

== Notable submarine patent owners ==
A notable case of a single submarine patent is the George B. Selden automobile design, applied for in 1879 and issued in 1895, which led to the creation of the Association of Licensed Automobile Manufacturers.

Gilbert Hyatt was awarded a patent claiming an invention pre-dating both Texas Instruments and Intel, describing a "microcontroller". The patent was later invalidated, but not before substantial royalties were paid out. He also still has two even wider patents still pending, also dating from the same period.

Jerome H. Lemelson filed many applications that became submarine patents, including applications related to pop up in camcorders, VCRs, bar code readers, automated teller machines, machine vision systems, among many others. He and his heirs have collected over $1.3 billion (U.S.) in royalties. In 2004 Lemelson's estate was defeated in a notable court case involving Symbol Technologies and Cognex Corporation, which sought (and received) a ruling that 76 claims under Lemelson's machine-vision patents were unenforceable. The plaintiff companies, with the support of dozens of industry supporters, spent millions on this landmark case. The ruling was upheld on September 9, 2005, by a three-judge panel of the U.S. Court of Appeals for the Federal Circuit under the doctrine of laches, citing "unreasonably long … delays in prosecution." Lemelson's estate appealed for a review by the full circuit en banc. On November 16, 2005, the full court declined to review the case, and, citing "prejudice to the public as a whole", extended the original unenforceability ruling to all claims under the patents in question.

== See also ==
- After claiming
- Evergreening
- Patent misuse
- Patent troll
- Term of patent in the United States
