= First to file and first to invent =

Concepts in patent law

First to file and first to invent are legal concepts that define who has the right to the grant of a patent for an invention. Since March 16, 2013, after the United States abandoned its "first to invent/document" system, all countries have operated under the "first-to-file" patent priority requirement.

== First to file ==
In a first-to-file system, the right to grant a patent for a given invention lies with the first person to file a patent application for protection of that invention, regardless of the date of the actual invention.

== First to disclose ==
The concept of a grace period, under which early disclosure does not prevent the discloser from later filing and obtaining a patent, must be distinguished here from the FTI system. Germany and the UK formerly had a concept of the grace period. Both FTI and grace period systems afforded early discloser protection against later filers. The FTI system allowed non-disclosers to overturn established parties, whereas the grace system only protects early disclosers. The US moved to a grace system on 16 March 2013, which has been termed "first-to-disclose" by some writers.

== First to invent ==
Canada, the Philippines, and the United States were among the only countries to use first-to-invent systems, but each switched to first-to-file in 1989, 1998, and 2013 respectively.

Invention in the U.S. is generally defined to comprise two steps: (1) conception of the invention and (2) reduction to practice of the invention. When an inventor conceives of an invention and diligently reduces the invention to practice (by filing a patent application, by making, testing, and improving prototypes, etc.), the inventor's date of invention will be the date of conception. Thus, provided an inventor is diligent in actually reducing an application to practice, he or she will be the first inventor and the inventor entitled to a patent, even if another files a patent application, constructively reducing the invention to practice, before the inventor.

However, the first applicant to file has the prima facie right to the grant of a patent. Under the first-to-invent system, when two people claim the same invention, the USPTO would conduct an interference proceeding between them to review evidence of conception, reduction to practice, and diligence. Interference can be an expensive and time-consuming process.

== Canada's change to first-to-file ==
Canada changed from FTI to FTF in 1989. One study by researchers at McGill University found that contrary to expectations "the switch failed to stimulate Canadian R&D efforts. Nor did it have any effects on overall patenting. However, the reforms had a small adverse effect on domestic-oriented industries and skewed the ownership structure of patented inventions towards large corporations, away from independent inventors and small businesses."

== US change to first-inventor-to-file (FITF) ==
The America Invents Act, signed by Barack Obama on 16 September 2011, switched the U.S. right to the patent from a "first-to-invent" system to a "first-inventor-to-file" system for patent applications filed on or after 16 March 2013 and eliminated interference proceedings.

Many legal scholars have commented that such a change would require a constitutional amendment. Article I, Section 8, Clause 8 of the US Constitution gives Congress the power to "promote the Progress of ... useful Arts, by securing for limited Times to ... Inventors the exclusive Right to their respective ... Discoveries.” These scholars argue that this clause specifically prohibits a first-inventor-to-file system because the term "inventor" refers to a person who has created something that has not existed before.

The change has not been short of detractors. For example, the IEEE stated in its submission to the House Judiciary Committee, charged with the study of the Patent Reform Act of 2007, that "We believe that much of the legislation is a disincentive to inventiveness, and stifles new businesses and job growth by threatening the financial rewards available to innovators in U.S. industry. Passage of the current patent reform bill language would only serve to relax the very laws designed to protect American innovators and prevent infringement of their ideas."

Proponents argue that the FITF aligns the U.S. with the rest of the world, encourages early disclosure, and brings more certainty, simplicity, and economy to the patent process, all of which allow greater patent participation by startups.

== See also ==
- Glossary of patent law terms
- Submarine patent
- Inventor's notebook
