= Interference proceeding =

US patent law procedure

In United States patent law, an interference proceeding, also known as a priority contest, is an inter partes proceeding to determine the priority issues of multiple patent applications. Unlike in most other countries, which have long had a first-to-file system, until the enactment of the Leahy–Smith America Invents Act (AIA) in 2011, the United States operated under a first-to-invent. The interference proceeding determines which of several patent applications had been made by the first inventor.

The AIA switched the US to a first-to-file regime effective March 16, 2013, and interferences apply only to patent applications with an effective filing date prior to that change.

== Definition ==
An interference proceeding is an administrative proceeding conducted by a panel of administrative patent judges (administrative law judges sitting on the Board of Patent Appeals and Interferences) of the United States Patent and Trademark Office (USPTO) to determine which applicant is not entitled to the patent if both claimed the same invention in:

1. two or more pending patent applications, or
2. at least one pending patent application and at least one patent issued within a year of the pending application's filing date.

A panel, composed of judges on the Board of Patent Appeals and Interferences, a quasi-judicial body in the USPTO, hears an interference contest. Its final judgment adjudicating one party as an earlier inventor is called a priority award, or simply an award. Appeals from this tribunal are heard before either the United States Court of Appeals for the Federal Circuit or the United States District Court for the District of Columbia. See 35 U.S.C. § 144, 35 U.S.C. § 146.

== Parties ==
At least two parties are involved in an interference proceeding: the inventor(s) or applicant(s) who filed an earlier patent application are called the "senior party", and the other inventor(s) or applicant(s) are called the "junior party". Both parties can be referred as "contestants", but that term is currently more likely to be used to describe the junior party.

- Senior party: Merely being the first to file the application does not grant a party legal protection. It counts only as prima facie evidence that he or she is the first inventor. A senior party can also file a "motion to dissolve interference" to request the dismissal of challenges to its priority.
- Junior party: A party other than the senior party bears the burden of proving that he is the first inventor. The proceeding's administrator considers certain factors, such as the invention's conception date and the inventor's diligence in reducing the invention to practice. Until the 1960s, a junior party was frequently called an "interferant".

== Presumptions ==
Presumptions are stated in 37 C.F.R. 41.207(a):

(1) Order of invention. Parties are presumed to have invented interfering subject matter in the order of the dates of their accorded benefit for each count. If two parties are accorded the benefit of the same earliest date of constructive reduction to practice, then neither party is entitled to a presumption of priority with respect to the other such party.

(2) Evidentiary standard. Priority may be proved by a preponderance of the evidence, except a party must prove priority by clear and convincing evidence if the date of its earliest constructive reduction to practice is after the issue date of an involved patent or the publication date under 35 U.S.C. 122(b) of an involved application or patent.

== Leahy-Smith America Invents Act ==
On September 16, 2011, President Obama signed the Leahy-Smith America Invents Act into law. Part of the Act changed the U.S. patent system from a first-to-invent system to a first-to-file system. As such, interference proceedings for any patent application with an effective filing date on or after March 16, 2013, were eliminated from U.S. patent law. Derivation proceedings are replacing interference proceedings in the patent statutes, but the dispute surrounding a derivation proceeding is unrelated to that of an interference proceeding.
