= Leahy–Smith America Invents Act =

2011 U.S. law reforming the patent process

- Long title: To amend title 35, United States Code, to provide for patent reform.
- Acronyms (colloquial): AIA
- Nicknames: Patent Reform
- Enacted by: the 112th United States Congress
- Effective: September 16, 2012

Citations
- Public law: 112–29
- Statutes at Large: 125 Stat. 284 through 125 Stat. 341 (57 pages)

Legislative history
- Introduced in the Senate as "America Invents Act" (S. 23) by Patrick Leahy (D–VT) on January 25, 2011; Committee consideration by Judiciary Committee; Passed the Senate on March 8, 2011 (95–5); Passed the House on June 23, 2011 (304-117) with amendment; Senate agreed to House amendment on September 8, 2011 (89-9); Signed into law by President Barack Obama on September 16, 2011

The Leahy–Smith America Invents Act (AIA) is a United States federal statute that was passed by Congress and signed into law by President Barack Obama on September 16, 2011. The law represents the most significant legislative change to the U.S. patent system since the Patent Act of 1952 and closely resembles previously proposed legislation in the Senate in its previous session (Patent Reform Act of 2009).

Named for its lead sponsors, Sen. Patrick Leahy (D–VT) and Rep. Lamar Smith (R–TX), the Act switches the U.S. patent system from a "first to invent" to a "first inventor to file" system, eliminates interference proceedings, and develops post-grant opposition. Its central provisions went into effect on September 16, 2012 and on March 16, 2013.

== Provisions ==
=== First to file and grace period ===
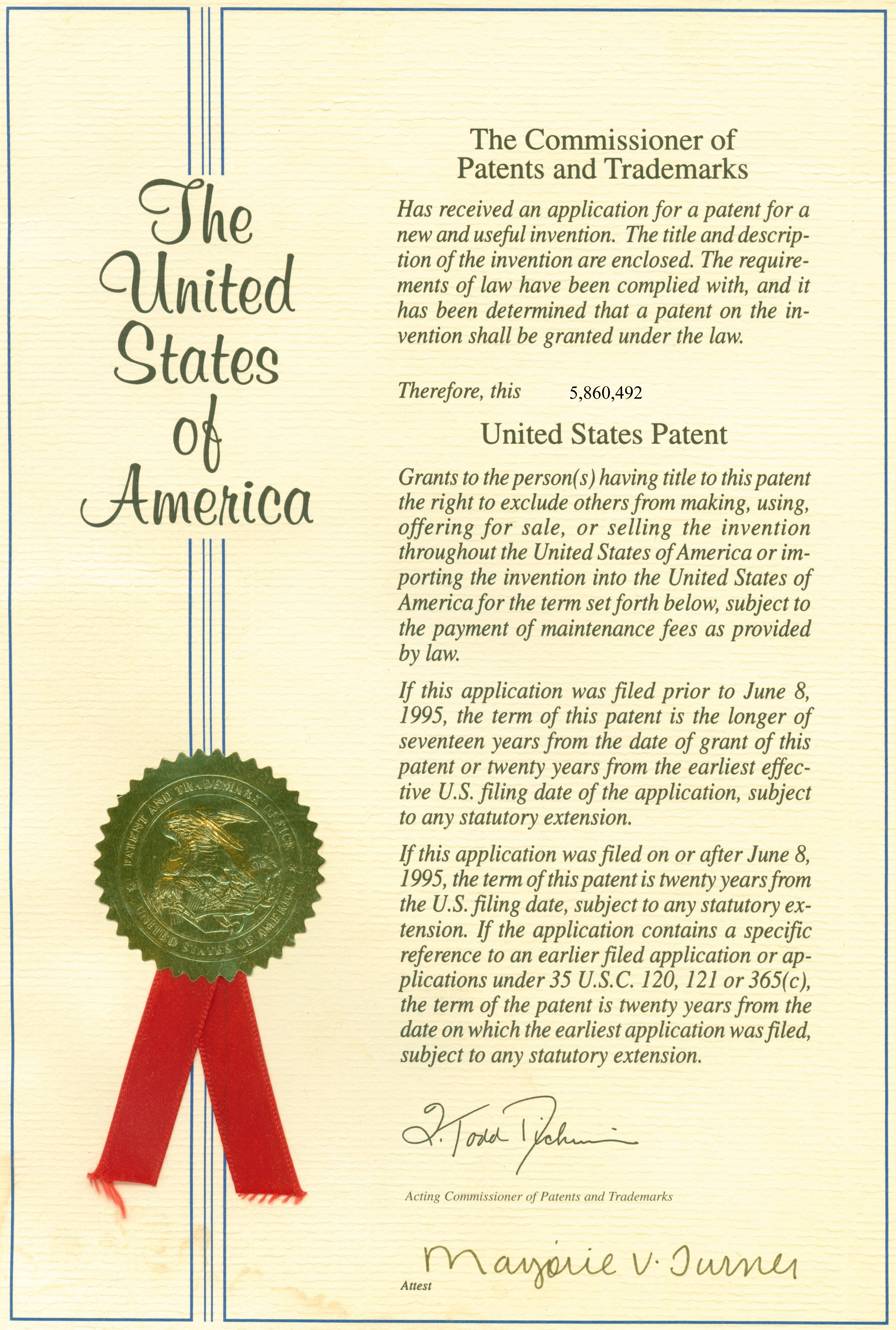
U.S. patent

The law switched the U.S. rights to a patent from the previous "first-to-invent" system to a "first inventor-to-file" system for patent applications filed on or after March 16, 2013. The law also expanded the definition of prior art used in determining patentability. Actions and prior art that bar patentability under the Act include public use, sales, publications, and other disclosures available to the public anywhere in the world as of the filing date, other than publications by the inventor within one year of filing (inventor's "publication-conditioned grace period"), whether or not a third party also files a patent application. The law also notably expanded prior art to include foreign offers for sale and public uses. Applicants that do not publish their inventions prior to filing receive no grace period.

Proceedings at the U.S. Patent Office for resolving priority contests among near-simultaneous inventors who both file applications for the same invention ("interference proceedings") were eliminated, because priority under the Act is determined based on filing date. An administrative proceeding—called a "derivation proceeding," similar to that currently used within some interference proceedings—is provided to ensure that the first person to file the application is actually an original inventor, and that the application was not derived from another inventor.

The AIA refers to the new regime as "First-Inventor-to-File (FITF)". This new regime operates differently from the "First-to-Invent" (FTI) regime previously in effect in the U.S. and the various "First-to-File" (FTF) regimes in place in the rest of the world. Different outcomes can occur under each of these three different regimes, depending on whether and how two different inventors publish or file patent applications.

=== Opposition procedures ===
The Act revised and expanded post-grant opposition procedures. The Act retained existing ex parte reexamination; added preissuance submissions by third parties; expanded inter partes reexamination, which was renamed inter partes review; and added post-grant review.

=== Additional changes ===
The America Invents Act included the following changes:

- Tax strategy inventions: Any strategy for reducing, avoiding, or deferring tax liability, whether known or unknown at the time of the invention or application for patent, is deemed insufficient to differentiate a claimed invention from the prior art.
- False marking: The Act eliminated false marking lawsuits, unless filed by the U.S. government or a competitor who can prove competitive injury. In addition, marking a product with a patent that formerly covered the product, but has since expired, is no longer a violation.
  Also in 2011, the United States Court of Appeals for the Federal Circuit clarified the standards for pleading False Patent Marketing Claims, which had become a source of prolific litigation, by providing a standard a false patent marking complaint must provide some objective indication to reasonably infer that the defendant was aware that the patent expired.
- Filing by other than inventor: An entity can file an application on behalf of an inventor who assigned or is under an obligation to assign the invention rights to the entity (or if the entity otherwise has financial interest in the invention), without seeking the inventor's execution of the application. However, any patent that issues belongs to the inventor, absent a written assignment from the inventor or inventor's estate to the entity.
- Best mode: Although an inventor is still required to "set forth" the best mode for accomplishing the invention, failure to disclose a best mode is not a basis for invalidating or rendering unenforceable an issued patent. The law formally retains the best mode requirement, but by making insufficient disclosure no longer an allowable defense against patent infringement, the law renders best mode unenforceable. This has left many patent lawyers wondering why the requirement was kept at all.
- Prior user rights defense: If an individual/entity begins using an invention ('user') more than a year before a subsequent inventor files for a patent on the same invention, then the user will have the right to continue using the invention in the same way after the subsequent inventor is granted a patent, as long as the user did not derive the invention from the subsequent inventor. These prior user rights are limited in scope and transferability, and have limited applicability to patents held by universities.
- Micro-entity: The AIA added a micro-entity status. A micro-entity includes an independent inventor with a previous calendar year gross income of less than 3 times the national median household income who has previously filed no more than four non-provisional patent applications, not including those the inventor was obligated to assign to an employer. A micro-entity also includes a university or an inventor under an obligation to assign the invention to a university. A micro-entity is entitled to a 75% reduction in many of the patent fees payable to the US Patent Office during prosecution of a US patent application. The patent office is expected to develop regulations to identify which fees will be eligible for the reduction and how joint inventors may qualify as a micro-entity.
- Confidential Sale: The Supreme Court in Helsinn Healthcare S. A. v. Teva Pharmaceuticals USA, Inc. unanimously ruled that the AIA has not overturned the long-standing rule that confidential sales of products containing the patented technology marks the beginning of the 1-year period to file the patent.

Savings from small entity (prior to act, based on small entity fees & includes 15% surcharge), to micro entity (post act):

USPTO Fee Type*	Before	After	Difference
Basic Utility Fee	$165	$70	$95
Utility Search Fee	$270	$150	$120
Utility Exam Fee	$110	$180	−$70
Issue Fee	$755	$240	$515
3.5 Year Fee	$490	$400	$90
7.5 Year Fee	$1240	$900	$340
11.5 Year Fee	$2,055	$1,850	$205
TOTALS	$5,085	$3,790	$1,295

=== USPTO practice changes ===
- Fee Setting Authority. The USPTO is given authority to adjust its fees in a way that "in the aggregate" recover the estimated costs of its activities.
- Review of inter partes reexamination. Direct appeal to the Federal Circuit is the only option for judicial review in inter partes reexamination cases.
- Additional USPTO facilities. Establishes additional USPTO satellite offices, the first to be located in Detroit, Michigan.
- Third-party submission of prior art. Third parties may submit prior art to a published application, if the prior art is submitted prior to the later of: the mailing date of the first office action, or six months after publication.

== Legislative history ==
Senator Patrick Leahy (D-VT) introduced similar bill S. 23 in the United States Senate on January 25, 2011, with seven co-sponsors (also members of the Judiciary Committee) that include Senators Coons (D-DE), Grassley (R-IA), Hatch (R-UT), Klobuchar (D-MN), Kyl (R-AZ), Lieberman (I-CT), and Sessions (R-AL). The Judiciary Committee unanimously approved the bill, and the United States Senate passed it March 8, 2011, by a vote of 95–5. H.R. 1249: was passed by the House Judiciary Committee on April 14, 2011, by a vote of 32-3.

The House of Representatives passed their version of the Act (H.R. 1249) on June 23, 2011 by a vote of 304–117, with sixty-seven Republicans and fifty Democrats voting against the bill. On September 8, 2011, the Senate approved the House version by an 89–9 bipartisan vote. On September 16, 2011, President Barack Obama signed the bill into law at a ceremony at Thomas Jefferson High School for Science and Technology in Northern Virginia.

=== Policy debate ===
Proponents of the bill argued that it may even the playing field by removing the tricks a well-funded infringer can currently use against a startup owning patented technology.

Proponents of the bill suggested that technology companies are subject to an unprecedented wave of patent lawsuits, stifling innovation and creating an overburdened and lethargic patent system. Advocates for the America Invents Act argued that it will create jobs, bolster innovation, streamline the patent system, reduce patent litigation, and keep the U.S. competitive globally.

Opponents of the Bill contended that it will lead to results similar to other nations' patent systems on which the bill is modeled — market incumbents will become further entrenched, the rate of startup formation will fall to levels in other countries, and access to angel and venture capital will fall to the levels of other countries, as described in the Impact of the Changes section below. A startup that relies on patents for protection from competitive risk, would, under the AIA, lose the protections of the previous regime to assemble the capital, strategic partners, and time for R&D and testing. The startup, exposed to the risk of copying by an established player in the marketplace, will be unable to attract venture capital, and so will lack the financial resources necessary to commercialize the startup's invention and grow the company. The weakening of patent protection diminishes incentives for investments and development.

In addition, opponents of the bill pointed out that the proposed revisions create greater options for accused infringers, and weaken the rights of patentees, and that patent reform should remain in the hands of the court system. Opponents argue that patent reform should be confined to administrative reforms at the USPTO. The time, effort and money that will be spent after issuance under the AIA on inter partes review and post-grant review would be better spent improving initial examination. According to patent attorney and reexamination specialist Taraneh Maghame, "the root of the problem trying to be addressed by the reexamination process could be better solved if quality patents are issued in the first instance."

==== First Inventor to File and grace period ====
Proponents of the AIA submitted that it would simplify the application process and bring U.S. patent law into better harmony with the patent law of other countries, most of which operate on the "first-to-file" system. Proponents also claimed that it would eliminate costly interference proceedings at the USPTO and reduce U.S. applicants' disadvantages in seeking patent rights outside of the United States.

Opponents contended that a "first inventor-to-file" system favored larger firms with well-established internal patenting procedures, patent committees and in-house attorneys over small business inventors. They claimed that the Act would weaken patent protection only in America. Opponents also submitted that it would (i) cause loss of patent rights due to new prior art published after the invention date but before the filing date, (ii) weaken the current grace period so it cannot be relied on, compelling inventors to behave as if there were no grace period, (iii) replace "interferences" with costly derivation proceedings, which are generally even more expensive than interferences, (iv) create a "race to the Patent Office" with every new idea, increasing the number of patent applications filed, with the attendant costs in attorney fees and diversion of company personnel to patent application preparation, (v) increase examination backlogs at the USPTO, (vi) do nothing to reduce U.S. applicants' costs of acquiring patents outside of the U.S., and (vii) decrease average patent quality.

It was found that the proposed new regime behaves more like a new and unique kind of patent system with characteristics of both the FTI and FTF regimes, rather than a harmonized system sharing characteristics of both.

Opponents pointed out that under First-to-Invent, a company with extensive resources could choose to practice First-to-File, by simply racing to the patent office as soon as every invention is conceived, eliminating any need to keep records of invention conception. Some pointed out that the changes switch the U.S. from a "first to conceive" system to a "first to reduce to practice." Meanwhile, a company with limited resources could still use First-to-Invent, only filing patents that matter after funding is obtained. Under First-(Inventor)-to-File, the reverse is not true: all parties, regardless of their resources, must adhere to "race to the patent office". This places small entities at an enormous disadvantage to large entities.

Many commenters raised the question of whether changing to FTF would be constitutional. Article I, Section 8 of the Constitution states: "To promote the Progress of ... useful Arts, by securing for limited Times to ... Inventors the exclusive Right to their respective ... Discoveries." The term "inventor" means "the first to invent." The commenters' argument generally took this two-part form: (1) "To invent" means "to create something that has not existed before." (2) Therefore, by the standard definitions of our language, adoption of FTF would require amending the constitution. Some peer-reviewed papers published in scholarly journals found this or similar problems. For this reason, the new AIA is not a first to file, but a "first inventor to file system." It eliminates between two parties, each who invent independently, retrospective analysis of murky "inventorship" arguments. Instead, it rewards those who invent, and then file first.

Canada changed from FTI to FTF in 1989 and experienced a measurable "adverse effect on domestic-oriented industries and skewed the ownership structure of patented inventions towards large corporations, away from independent inventors and small businesses."

==== Judicial review of reexamination decisions ====
Opponents noted that the AIA contained a provision that would deny the right of patent owners to obtain judicial review of adverse USPTO decisions in ex parte patent reexaminations by civil action in district court – a right that has existed under 35 U.S.C. § 306/ § 145 since the inception of reexamination in 1980. They contended that abolishing this right will leave direct appeal to the Federal Circuit as the only judicial recourse – an intolerable scenario for patent owners who need to rely on evidence that was unavailable during the administrative appeal stage. Opponents contended that this provision will exacerbate ex parte reexamination abuses by creating an unprecedented end-run around Federal District Courts in potentially all patent disputes. They warned that alleged infringers would simply file ex parte reexamination requests with USPTO, receive a final agency decision subject only to Federal Circuit review, essentially bypassing Federal courts. Opponents feared that given the deference the Federal Circuit must accord the agency (Zurko), large number of prospective/alleged infringers would choose this new favorable path to challenge a patent, overwhelming the USPTO, causing much lengthier delays in reexamination and holding up patentees' patent rights for years.

==== Post-grant opposition ====
Advocates argued that allowing a challenge of a patent in the first year after the issuance or reissuance of a patent would improve patent quality by allowing third party inputs. Opponents note that: (a) inter partes review under the Bill allows a third party to challenge the validity of any claim(s) in a patent *after* the first year; (b) re-exams are in fact used, not as an alternative to litigation, but rather as a supplement to litigation. In FY2008, 62% of current inter partes re-exams and 30% of ex parte re-exams were simultaneously in litigation; (c) predatory corporations can and do file multiple post-grant oppositions against startup companies for the purpose of inflicting financial pain and through this practice have successfully extracted patent licensing and purchase agreements on favorable terms; (d) the existing inter partes process in a contested case now takes 34 to 53 months for an un-appealed reexam (assuming no "rework" by the patent office and no secondary appeals to the BPAI, the Federal Circuit, or the Supreme Court), and 5 to 8 years for appealed cases. When Congress created inter partes reexamination, it directed the USPTO to conduct these reexaminations with "special dispatch." The Bill expands the existing inter partes procedure, adding discovery and a hearing in the Patent Trial and Appeal Board. Consequently, under the Bill, pendency of the inter partes procedure will likely increase, despite the legislative fiat requiring 18 month disposition; and (e) the Bill all but requires a federal district court to stay a patent infringement suit copending with an inter partes review. Because of the enormous costs and long pendency of inter partes review, the grant of a stay in a copending infringement suit could effectively be "game over" for the patent owner.

Post Grant Review is available only if the challenger has not already initiated a civil action in District Court. Post Grant Review proceedings are to be conducted by the Patent Trial and Appeal Board, which will replace the Board of Patent Appeals and Interferences on September 16, 2012 for proceedings that commence on or after that date. Post Grant Review proceedings may be terminated either by settlement or by decision of the Board. There is also estoppel associated with the challenger at the USPTO, the District Courts and the International Trade Commission (ITC) in asserting invalidity on any ground that could have been reasonably raised during Post Grant Review.

==== Impact of the changes ====
The use of reexamination, or the threat of its use, in patent infringement litigation is common. "[G]amesmanship of the reexamination process has, in the view of some, become more the rule than the exception. Reportedly it has become 'standard procedure' that a defendant in patent litigation 'take an aggressive stance by saying it plans to request a re-exam on the patent-in-suit or even all' of the plaintiff's patents. The threat of reexamination is then used as leverage in licensing negotiations, intimidating patent-holders into settling out of court for lower amounts than those to which the value of their patents might entitle them." Reexamination requests from companies accused of patent infringement have recently more than tripled. "Ironically, Congress intended that the reexamination process should have just the opposite effect: "Patent office reexamination will greatly reduce, if not end, the threat of legal costs being used to 'blackmail' such [patent-] holders into allowing patent infringements or being forced to license their patents for nominal fees."

Critics argued that the AIA would prevent startup companies, a potent source of inventions, from raising capital and being able to commercialize their inventions. Typically, an inventor will have a sufficient conception of the invention and funding to file a patent application only after receiving investment capital. Before receiving investor funding, the inventor must have already conceived the invention, proven its functionality, and done sufficient market research to propose a detailed business plan. Investors will then scrutinize the business plan and evaluate competitive risk, which is inherently high for startup companies as new entrants into the market. Opponents of the Bill contended that, if the bill becomes law, venture funding will be diverted to less risky investments.

Proponents of the Bill argued that revision of both post grant opposition and interference will help US inventors. They pointed out that a patent that has survived a post-grant review will be stronger than one without. Neither side put forward a cost-benefit balance showing that the added strength of these patents will compensate for the loss of access to venture capital, though the venture capitalists that have opined on the likely balance have concluded that the post-grant review will reduce access to capital more than it increases patent strength.

Proponents also argued that the Act provides numerous benefits to small businesses such as fast-track patent examination, fee reductions, and expanded prior user rights.

==== Other issues ====
Critics of the bill expressed concern, that the administration has been guided by the same people who previously lobbied for patent reform on behalf of IBM and Microsoft, and that their appointments were a violation of the Obama Administration's "Revolving Door Ban". USPTO Director David Kappos represented IBM, Marc Berejka (Senior Policy Advisor, Office of the Secretary, U.S. Department of Commerce) lobbied on behalf of Microsoft, and Secretary of Commerce Gary Locke, to whom the USPTO reported until Locke was made Ambassador to China on August 1, 2011, also has extensive ties to Microsoft.

Opponents raised the concern that the bill could cause the US to lose its leadership position in innovation, particularly as a result of the adverse impact on small companies, who were unrepresented in the negotiations leading up to this bill. Also, critics complained that this bill will not do enough to curb "non-practising entities" from engaging in purportedly overly aggressive behaviors.

Critics pointed out that the new bill fails to address a glaring issue that will seemingly continue to exist under the new system: the extensive backlog of existing patent applications. Instead of hiring more examiners to process this backlog, "...Congress chose to multiply the alternative dispute-resolution procedures at the PTO, giving the office more work to do without a guarantee of more money. The result was a muddle as well as a missed opportunity."

=== Proposed amendments ===
==== H.R.9 (Innovation Act) ====
In May 2015, the House Judiciary Committee approved with a majority vote the advancement of the bipartisan Innovation Act for later consideration on the Senate and House floor. H.R.9 is intended to amend title 35, United States Code, and the Leahy–Smith America Invents Act to make improvements and technical corrections. In particular, this bill aims at reducing patent trolls, lengthy IP litigations and frivolous attempts by legal holders of patents through limitations on Post Grant Reviews. The Innovation Act would also change fee requirements, among other modifications, in order to make the plaintiff financially responsible for such attempts, which often are viewed as extortions rather than disputes of the patent claim based on technological considerations. In February 2016, the Senate Committee on Small Business and Entrepreneurship held a hearing on H.R.9 and also approved it for consideration.

==== S.1137 (Patent Act) ====
In June 2015, the Committee also approved the Patent act for advancement to the House and Senate floor after a markup session was held. S. 1137 is also an intended amendment to the America Invents act, and has a similar purpose to H.R.9 by addressing the disclosure of financial interests and technical details by the patent holder. The bill would require the patent owners to supply specific information on the type and extent of the patent claim before filing suit in a district court.

== Legal challenge ==
In Madstad Engineering Inc. v. USPTO, Appeal No. 2013-1511 (Fed. Cir. July 1, 2014) plaintiff challenged the constitutionality of the act in placing an undue burden on its firm. Specifically, the plaintiff had to heighten computer security around potential inventions to prevent hackers from stealing intellectual property because of the first-to-file provision, litigating "much of today's intellectual property...is created on or stored on computers, virtually all of which are connected to the Internet...Since the [AIA] no longer concerns itself with actual inventorship, the new law makes it attractive and profitable for computer hackers to steal IP and file it as their own or to sell it to the highest bidder." The court ruled Madstad had no standing in court without concrete proof of an injury and dismissed the case, but reaffirmed its supremacy over patent law cases without addressing the constitutionality of the act's first-to-file provision.
