= Duty of disclosure =

Malayalam

A duty of disclosure or duty to disclose is a legal duty that requires a person in possession of information to provide that information to other persons or entities. A duty of disclosure often arises in the context of financial transactions, insurance, and legal proceedings.

== Insurance disclosure ==
In the United Kingdom and in Australia, in relation to insurance, duty of disclosure refers to the obligation of the insured person or proposed insured person to disclose to the insurer every matter that he or she "know[s], or could reasonably be expected to know, is relevant to the insurers' decision whether to accept the risk of insurance" or to influence the terms offered.

== United States ==
=== Legal proceedings ===
In U.S. legal procedure, each party to a lawsuit has the duty to disclose certain information, such as the names and addresses of witnesses, and copies of any documents that it intends to use as evidence, to the opposing party. This duty is subject to certain exceptions, as outlined in the Federal Rules of Civil Procedure; furthermore, the rules applicable in state courts vary from state to state.

Pursuant to U.S. constitutional law, in what is known as Brady disclosure, a prosecutor has a duty to disclose material evidence that is favorable to a criminal defendant's case.

Although attorney-client privilege ends after the death of a client, a lawyer may not make misrepresentations about the death of a client and there may thus be a duty to disclose the death to a court or adverse party.

=== Patents ===
In United States patent law, during patent prosecution, an applicant has a duty to disclose all information material to patentability. Breach of this duty can lead to a holding of inequitable conduct, in which case the patent is unenforceable.

In February 2023... the U.S. Patent and Trademark Office (USPTO) held a virtual panel discussion on the duty of disclosure and duty of reasonable inquiry.

== See also ==
- Duty of confidentiality (limits of the duty of confidentiality)
- Duty of candor
- Information disclosure statement (U.S. patent law)
