= Originating application =

An originating application is the first, provisional, or primary application in any legal process, such as a lawsuit, application for a real estate mortgage, patent, or bankruptcy petition.

In Australia, civil court proceedings are usually commenced with the plaintiff filing an originating application.

In England, it is a term describing the initial bankruptcy petition. It may also be used in England for administrative appeals.

In the United States, an originating application is usually reserved for the first form filed to secure a bank loan or mortgage.

== See also ==
- Provisional application
- Patent prosecution
- Continuing patent application
