= Harm =

Moral and legal concept

Harm is a moral and legal concept with multiple definitions. It generally functions as a synonym for evil or anything that is bad under certain moral systems. Something that causes harm is harmful, and something that does not is harmless.

== Philosophical construction ==
Moral philosopher Bernard Gert construed harm (or "evil") as any of the following:

- pain
- death
- disability
- mortality
- loss of ability or freedom
- loss of pleasure.

Joel Feinberg gives an account of harm as setbacks to interests. He distinguishes welfare interests from ulterior interests. Hence from his view there are two kinds of harm.

Welfare interests are:

interests in the continuance for a foreseeable interval of one's life, and the interests in one's own physical health and vigor, the integrity and normal functioning of one's body, the absence of absorbing pain and suffering or grotesque disfigurement, minimal intellectual acuity, emotional stability, the absence of groundless anxieties and resentments, the capacity to engage normally in social intercourse and to enjoy and maintain friendships, at least minimal income and financial security, a tolerable social and physical environment, and a certain amount of freedom from interference and coercion.

Ulterior interests are "a person's more ultimate goals and aspirations", such as "producing good novels or works of art, solving a crucial scientific problem, achieving high political office, successfully raising a family".

Many philosophers have proposed variations of moral obligations to avoid causing harm, or have promoted harmlessness as a virtue, and ethical frameworks have been developed considering harmlessness as a principle in decision-making and social interactions. The phrase, "do no harm" (in Latin "Primum non nocere"), is a popular medical ethic. According to Gonzalo Herranz, Professor of Medical Ethics at the University of Navarre, Primum non nocere was introduced into American and British medical culture by Worthington Hooker in his 1847 book Physician and Patient. Hooker attributed it to the Parisian pathologist and clinician Auguste François Chomel (1788–1858), the successor of Laennec in the chair of medical pathology, and the preceptor of Pierre Louis. Apparently, the axiom was part of Chomel's oral teaching. Hooker, however, was quoting an earlier work by Elisha Bartlett who, on pages 288–289, says "The golden axiom of Chomel, that it is only the second law of therapeutics to do good, its first law being this – not to do harm – is gradually finding its way into the medical mind, preventing an incalculable amount of positive ill". A detailed investigation of the origins of the aphorism was reported by the clinical pharmacologist Cedric M. Smith in the April 2005 issue of The Journal of Clinical Pharmacology. It addresses the questions of the origin and chronology of appearance of the maxim. Rather than being of ancient origin as usually assumed, the specific expression, and its even more distinctive associated Latin phrase, has been traced back to an attribution to Thomas Sydenham (1624–1689) in a book by Thomas Inman (1860), Foundation for a New Theory and Practice of Medicine. Inman's book and his attribution were reviewed by an author who signed simply as "H. H." in The American Journal of the Medical Sciences, also in 1860.

== Medical classifications ==
In the UK, harm is classified in a medical context as "severe", "moderate" or "mild". Severe harm is associated with resulting permanent disability, whereas mild and moderate harm can be resolved over a period of time. Medical reporting duties and the statutory duty of candour are associated with moderate and severe harm and also with "prolonged psychological harm".

== Harm reduction ==
Harm statistics for common drugs

Harm reduction, or harm minimization, refers to a range of intentional practices and public health policies designed to lessen the negative social and/or physical consequences associated with various human behaviors, both legal and illegal. Harm reduction is used to decrease negative consequences of recreational drug use and sexual activity without requiring abstinence, recognizing that those unable or unwilling to stop can still make positive change to protect themselves and others.

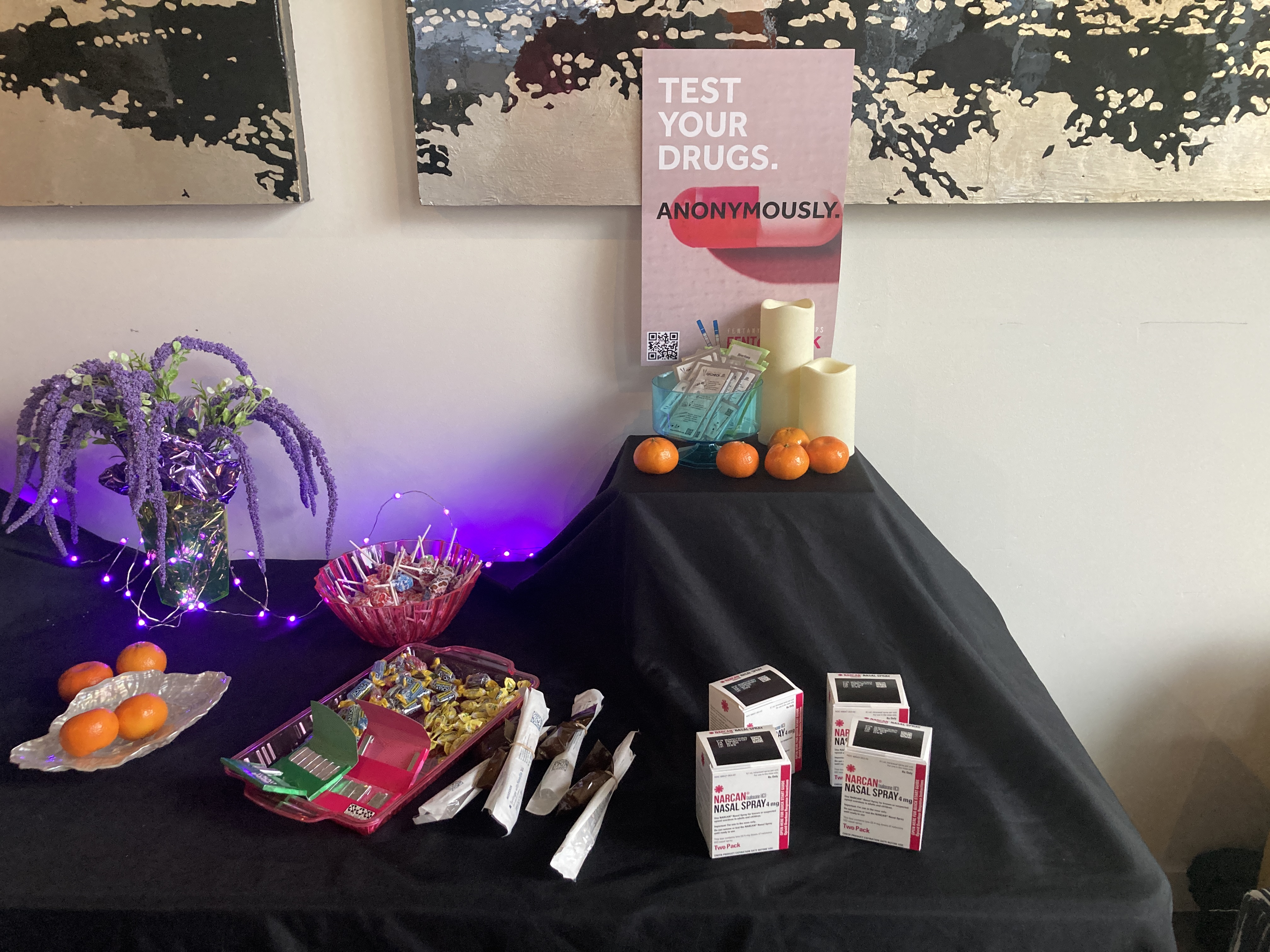
A table of various supplies for testing drugs

Harm reduction is most commonly applied to approaches that reduce adverse consequences from drug use, and harm reduction programs now operate across a range of services and in different regions of the world. As of 2020, some 86 countries had one or more programs using a harm reduction approach to substance use, primarily aimed at reducing blood-borne infections resulting from use of contaminated injecting equipment.

== See also ==
- Harm principle
- Harm reduction
- Injury (disambiguation)
