= AVMA =

AVMA may refer to:

- Action Against Medical Accidents, the UK charity for patient safety and justice
- American Veterinary Medical Association, a not-for-profit association representing more than 99,500 U.S. veterinarians
- MTV Australia Awards (previously AVMAs), Australia's first awards show to celebrate both local and international acts
