= Pudsey Town Hall =

Municipal building in Pudsey, West Yorkshire, England

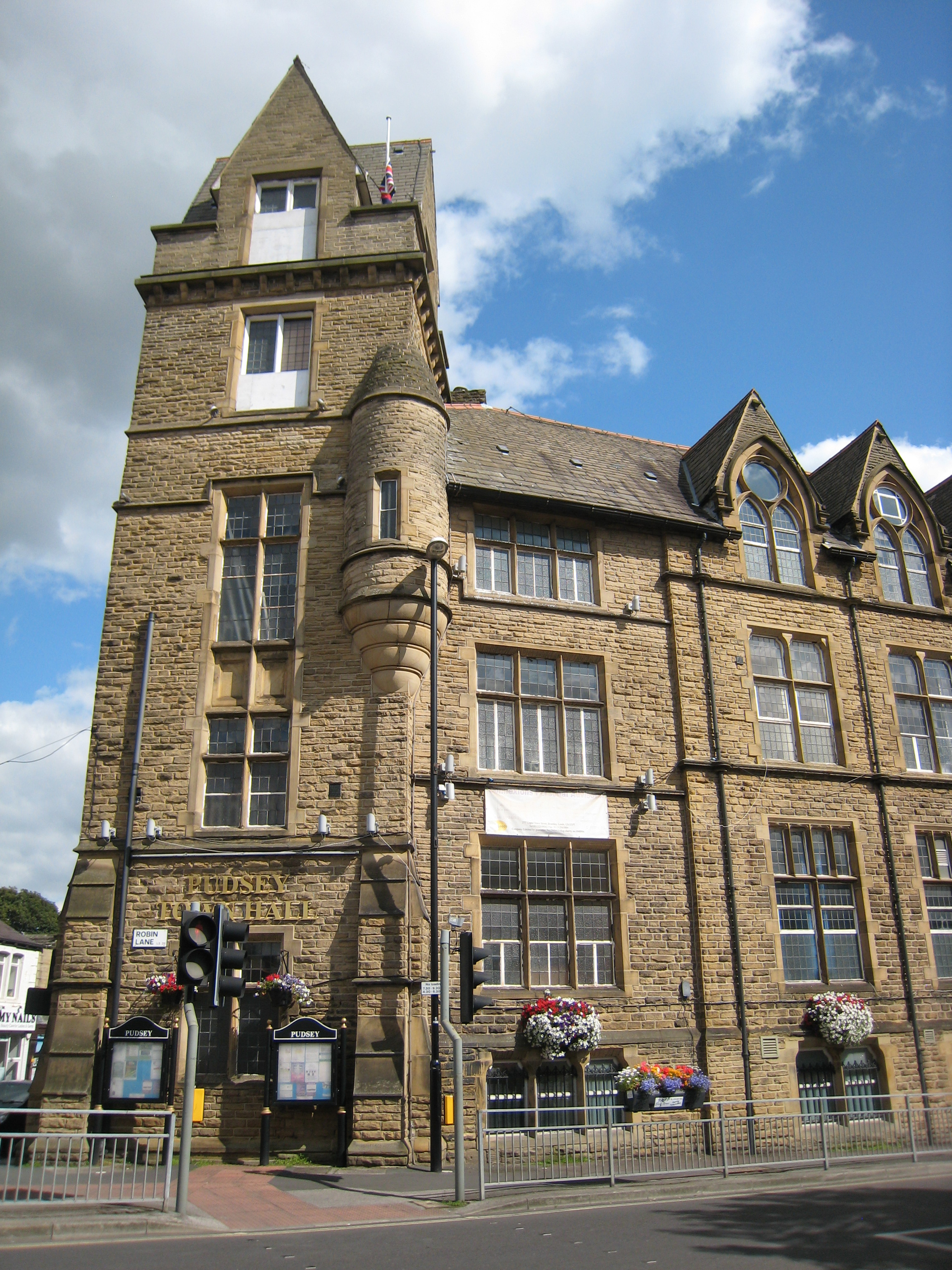
- Pudsey Town Hall

- Shown in West Yorkshire
- 53.7966°N 1.6624°W
- Location: Robin Lane, Pudsey

History
- Built: 1880

Site notes
- Architect(s): Hope and Jardine
- Architectural style: Gothic style

Pudsey Town Hall is a municipal building in Robin Lane, Pudsey, West Yorkshire, England. The town hall was the headquarters of Pudsey Urban District Council from 1912 to 1974.

== History ==
The building was originally commissioned as a new home for the local mechanics' institute which had been founded in 1847; it left its initial home in Church Lane in around 1865 and then rented short-term accommodation in several locations before the board of the institute decided to find a permanent home. The site they selected was a vacant plot located between two cooperative stores which was acquired for £1,600.

The foundation stone for the new institute building was laid by the former chairman of the local board, William Dibb Scales of Grove House, on 6 October 1879. It was designed by Hope and Jardine of Bradford and was officially opened by the local member of parliament, Herbert Gladstone, on 10 November 1880. The design included a prominent square tower at the junction of Lowtown and Robin Lane. The Lowtown elevation of the tower featured an arched doorway with engaged Corinthian order columns and a carved tympanum, while its Robin Lane elevation featured a bartizan; there were sash windows on the upper floors on both elevations and there was also originally a 110 feet (34 m) spire on the top of the tower. Internally, the principal rooms were a large public hall and lecture theatre, both on the first floor.

An extension was built in 1900 to accommodate the local grammar school but the school relocated to Richardshaw Lane in January 1911. The departure of the school and dwindling attendances at the institute precipitated financial difficulties and, in late 1911, the institute sought a purchaser for the building: the local council for Pudsey, which had been awarded municipal borough status in 1900, acquired the building and converted it into a town hall in February 1912. The new accommodation included a council chamber and a courtroom. The young men of Pudsey were called up at the town hall and undertook their medical examinations there during the First World War.

The building continued to serve as the headquarters of Pudsey Borough Council for much of the 20th century although the spire, which had become unstable, had to be removed in 1965. The building ceased to be local seat of government when the enlarged Leeds City Council was formed in 1974. Later use of the building was limited: there were occasional meetings of the local area management committee of Leeds City Council and, although a One Stop Centre was established in the building in the early years of the 21st century, the centre moved to Pudsey Library in May 2016. The town hall continued to be used, briefly, as a base for the local integrated Health and Social Care teams, but fell completely vacant by 2020.

The Town Hall is not a listed building, but advisors to the City Council recognise it as a "positive" building whose character should be preserved.
