= Adrian Riley =

British artist and graphic designer (born 1971)

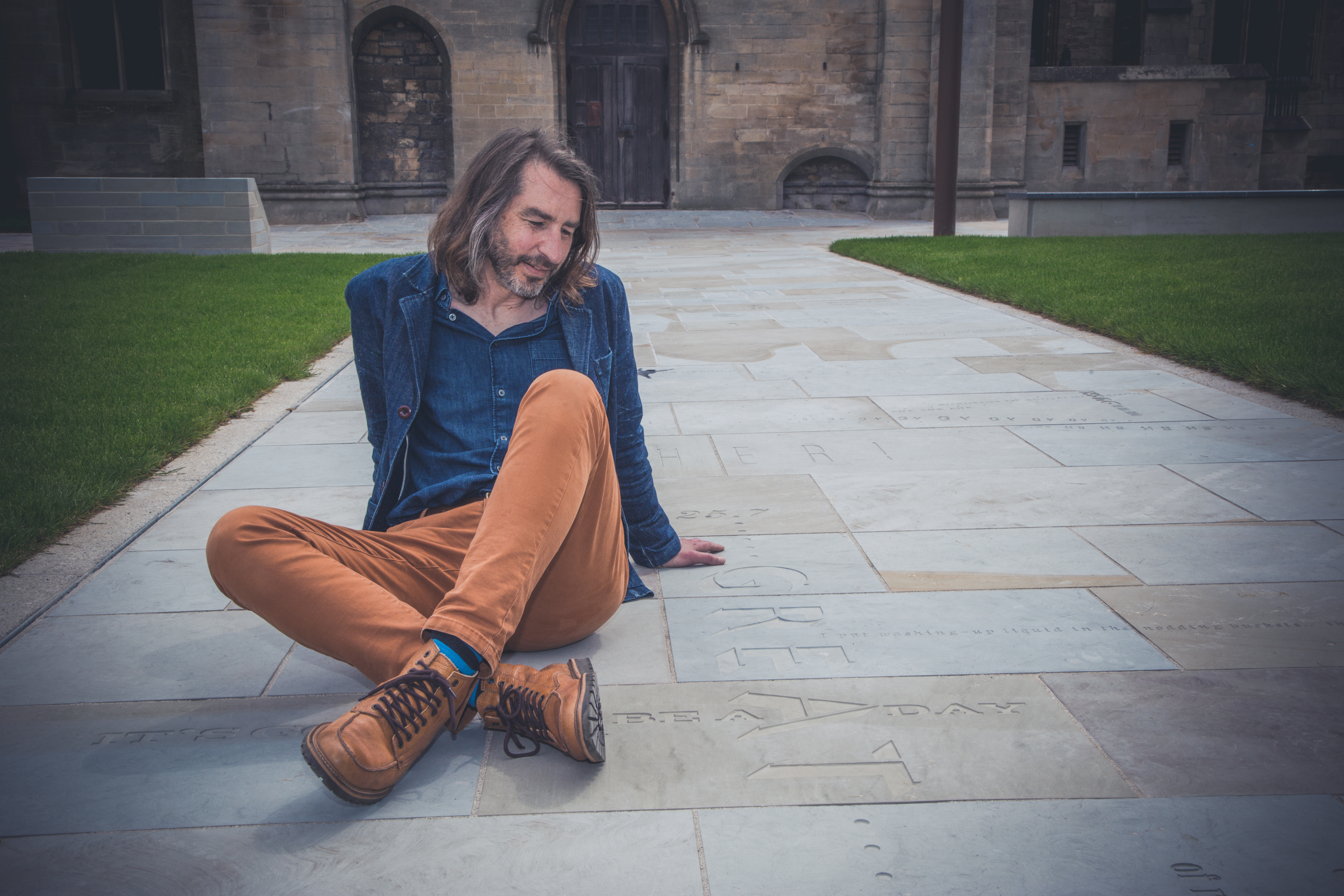
- Riley in 2022
- Born: 1971 (age 54–55); Leeds, West Yorkshire, England
- Education: Leeds Arts University
- Occupations: Artist; graphic designer

Adrian Riley (b. Leeds, 1971) is a British artist and graphic designer based in Scarborough, North Yorkshire. Riley has created permanent artworks for the public realm across the UK, including work for the National Trust, English Heritage, NHS, RSPB, and local authorities and arts organisations. Primarily working with words, particularly with local residents as co-creators, Riley has also collaborated with writers and poets, including Simon Armitage, Ian Duhig, John W. Clarke and Charlotte Oliver, and with artists including Rachel Welford, Annabel McCourt and British comic book artist John Cooper.

== Early life and education ==
Riley was born in Leeds, West Yorkshire in 1971 and grew up in Pudsey close to the border with Bradford. He attended Pudsey Grangefield School and then studied graphic design at Leeds Arts University graduating in 1990.

== Career ==
Riley worked as a designer at Bradford College and Leeds Metropolitan University before forming the multidisciplinary design studio Electric Angel Design in Bradford in 2000. In Bradford he was part of the Atom Studios collective based in a former woollen mill Bradford city centre. He worked on several projects with Artworks Creative Communities including his first public art - the design of metal gates in West Bowling co-created with the community and commissioned by English Heritage.

In 2003, Riley relocated his studio to Scarborough where he co-founded the practitioners network Creative Coast with local arts organisation Create.

In 2008 he co-presented the town's winning bid for the accolade of 'UK Enterprise Capital', Scarborough went on to win the European Enterprise Awards the same year as the UK's entry with Scarborough's submission packs designed by Electric Angel. As a result Riley was invited to represent Scarborough meeting then Prime Minister Gordon Brown at Downing Street.

In 2005, Electric Angel Design recreated the logo for The Boys' Brigade.

In 2022, Riley contributed to BBC Radio 4 Today programme series 'Britain's Favourite Beach' with a response that looked at history through Scarborough's illuminated seafront signage.

=== Public artworks ===
Riley's work in the public realm includes the following:

- Words in the Landscape (Sutton Bank, North Yorkshire)
  A series of artworks on a circular route at Sutton Bank, commissioned in 2024 by The North York Moors National Park. The work consists of four new artworks including poems by William Wordsworth, Ian Duhig and Charlotte Oliver, and encourages visitors to explore the landscape from the perspective of birds.
- Balancing Act (Brimham Rocks, North Yorkshire)
  Collaboration with the Poet Laureate, Simon Armitage and stone carver Richard Dawson at the National Trust Site of Special Scientific Interest (SSSI) of Brimham Rocks. Commissioned in 2023 by the National Trust.
- Signs of the Times (Scarborough)
  Six illuminated text artworks and accompanying audio created from local residents stories and memories marking favourite but uncelebrated town centre locations. Commissioned by Scarborough-based arts organisation ARCADE with Scarborough Town Team in 2023.
- The Migrating Zoetrope (Hull)
  100-metre (330-foot) long artwork combining semi-abstract imagery and minimalist poetry inspired by bird migration and sloops of the Humber. Collaboration with artist Annabel McCourt. Commissioned in 2022 by the Environment Agency.
- Come Follow Me (Grimsby)
  A 35-metre (115-foot) long text artwork etched into stone paving weaving together origin myths, residents stories, found text from industrial heritage, poetry and a hopscotch of dates. Part of a £1.8 Million development of St James Square in front of Grimsby Minster. Commissioned by North East Lincolnshire Council.
- Walls Have Ears (Dewsbury)
  Commissioned by Kirklees District Council to create a series of seven large metal wall panels exploring the hopes and dreams of the local community, from young children to retirees. The panels use lettering inspired by the architecture of the town.
- Priory Park Pillars (Nottingham)
  Commissioned to design and manufacture artworks for a new sculpture park celebrating the history of Lenton Priory. The five 'Priory Park Pillars' were the result of historical research and workshops with local students. Each feature a medieval inspired pattern and explanatory text telling an aspect of the site's history.
- Birdsong (RSPB Bempton, East Yorkshire)
  The result of working with the RSPB to create permanent artworks across the site and the visitor centre introducing visitors to the calls and song of the birdlife at Bempton Cliffs.
- Reckoning of Time (St Peter's Church, Monkwearmouth)
  A series of 12 windows, in collaboration with Rachel Welford, referring to Bede who lived at the twin monasteries of Monkwearmouth-Jarrow, based on historical research. Manufacturing took place at the National Glass Centre, located across from the church.
- Tidal Word Wave & Water Line (Bridlington, East Yorkshire)
  Collaboration with Rachel Welford to produce two large-scale site-specific typographic artworks on Bridlington Promenade based on found text and statistical tide data. The artworks form a series of panels fixed to an existing building, and a balustrade in front new-build structures as part of a £40m development.
- Song Tunnel (Leeds City Centre)
  A public artwork in the pedestrian underpass linking car parking to the new Leeds Arena music venue. The artwork features 60 unique typographic panels using song titles from bands and artists associated with the city including Scritti Politti and Tony Christie.

== Gallery ==
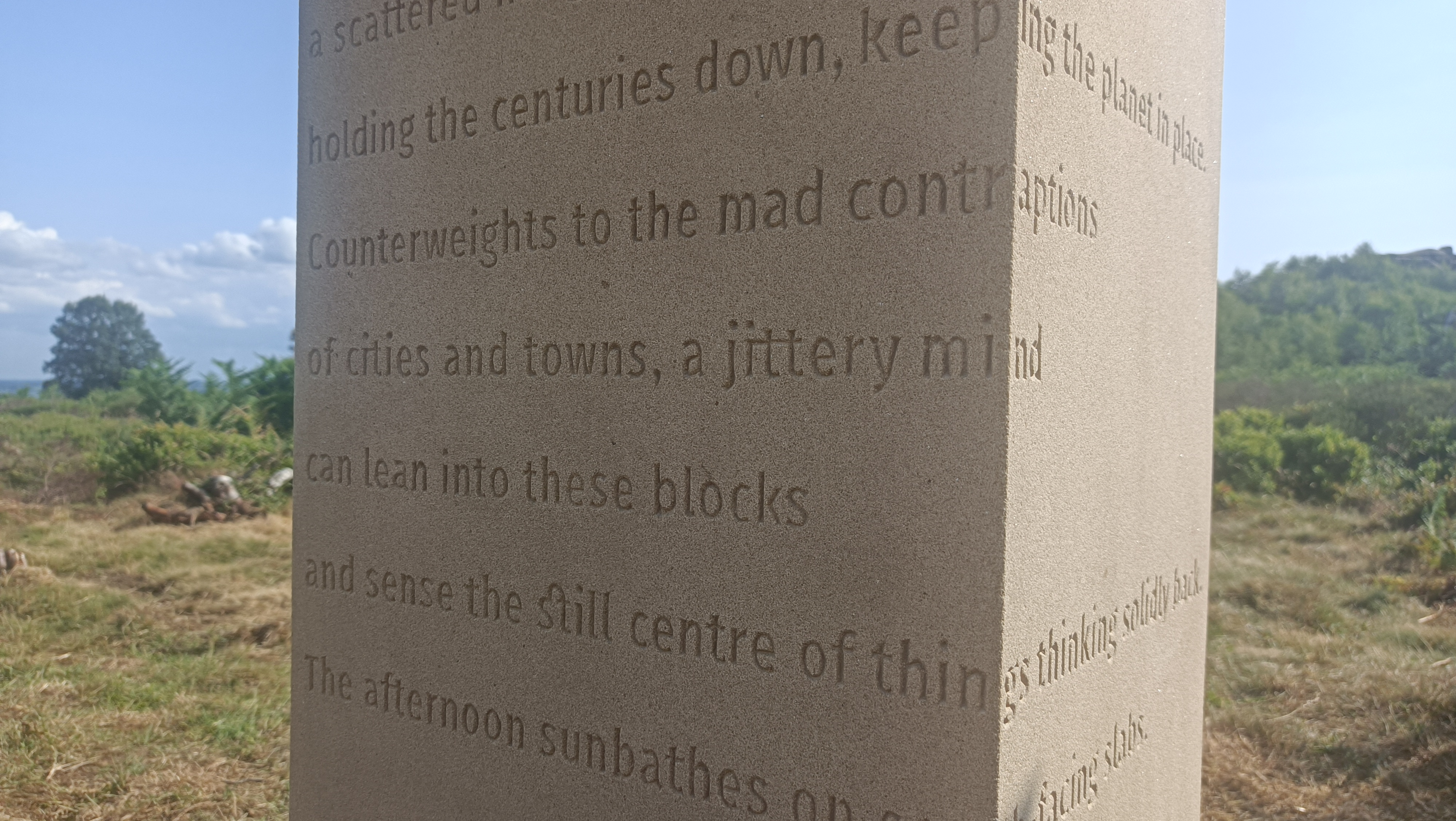
'Balancing Act' by Simon Armitage with Adrian Riley at Brimham Rocks, North Yorkshire (detail).

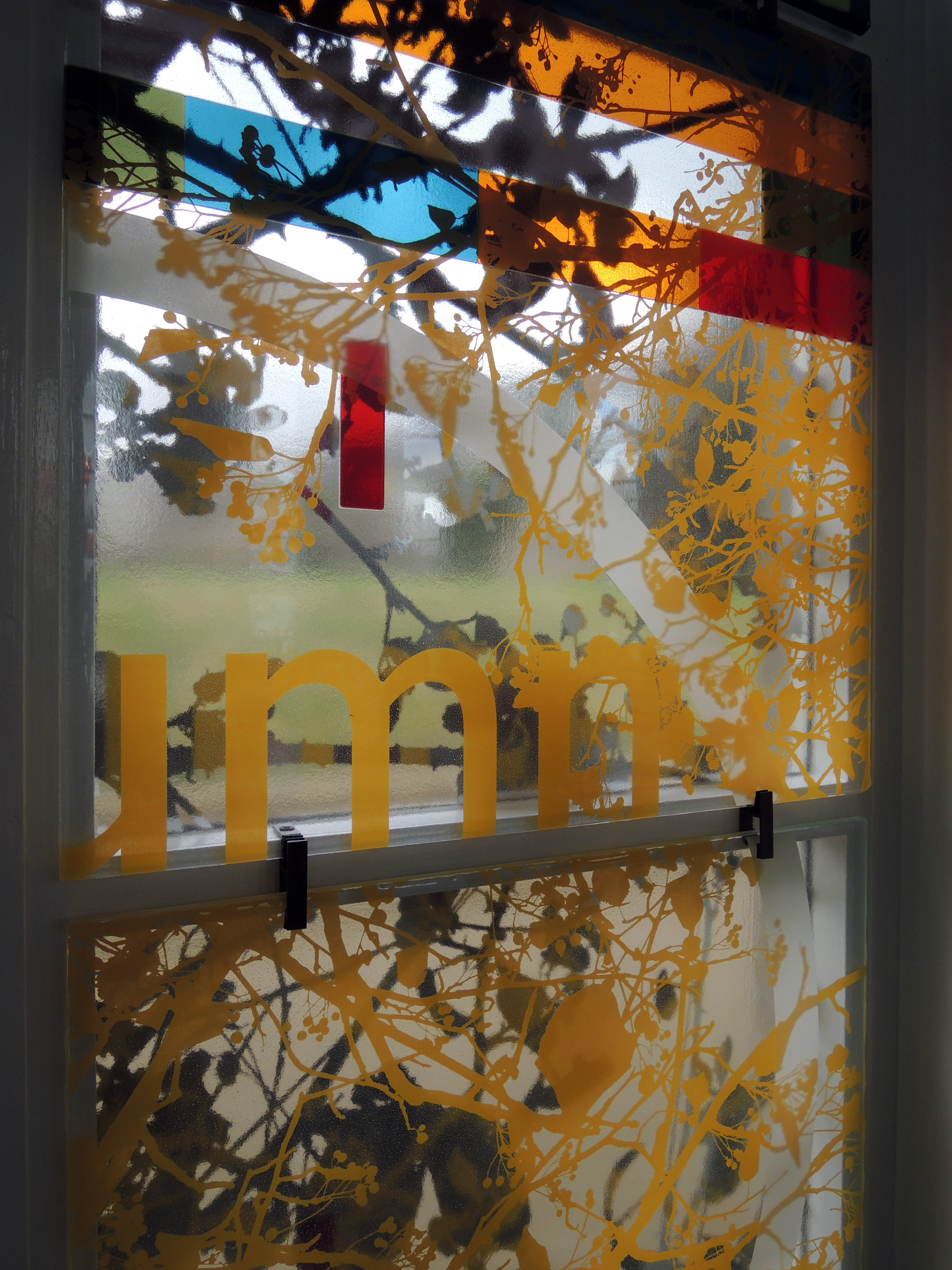
St Peter's Chapterhouse stained glass windows by Rachel Welford and Adrian Riley (detail)

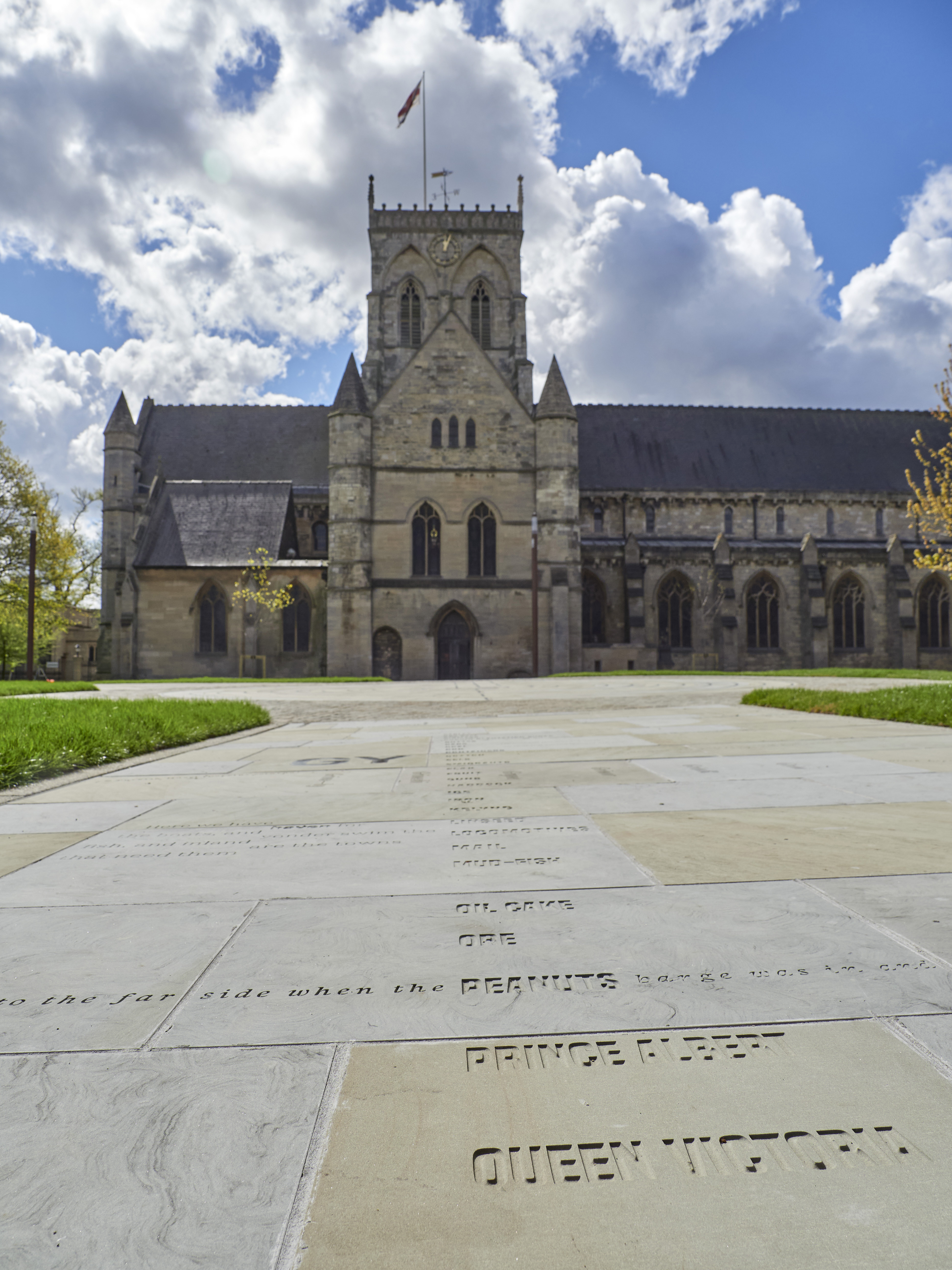
'Come Follow Me' by Adrian Riley at Grimsby Minster

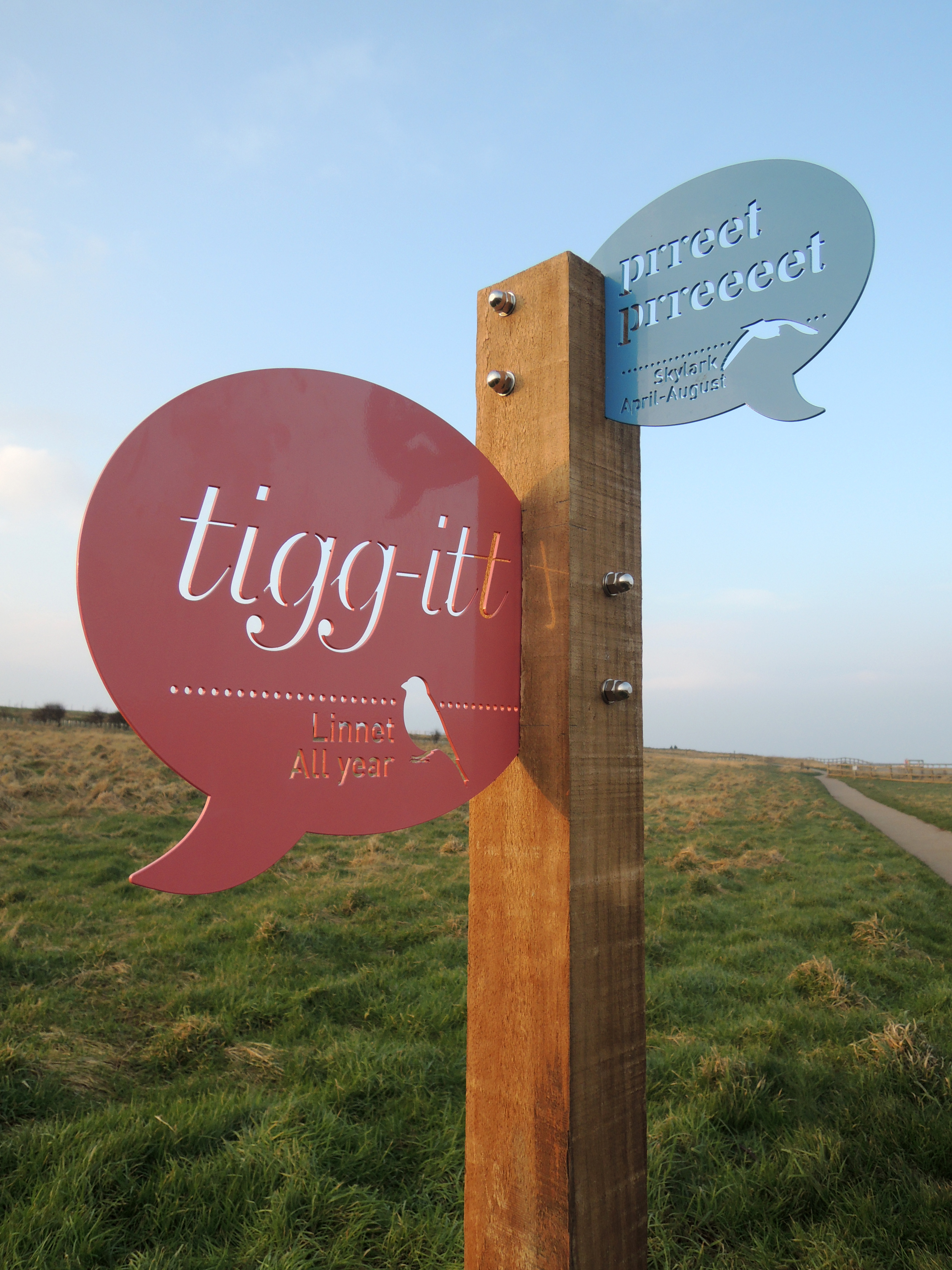
Phonetic birdsong panels by Adrian Riley at RSPB Bempton

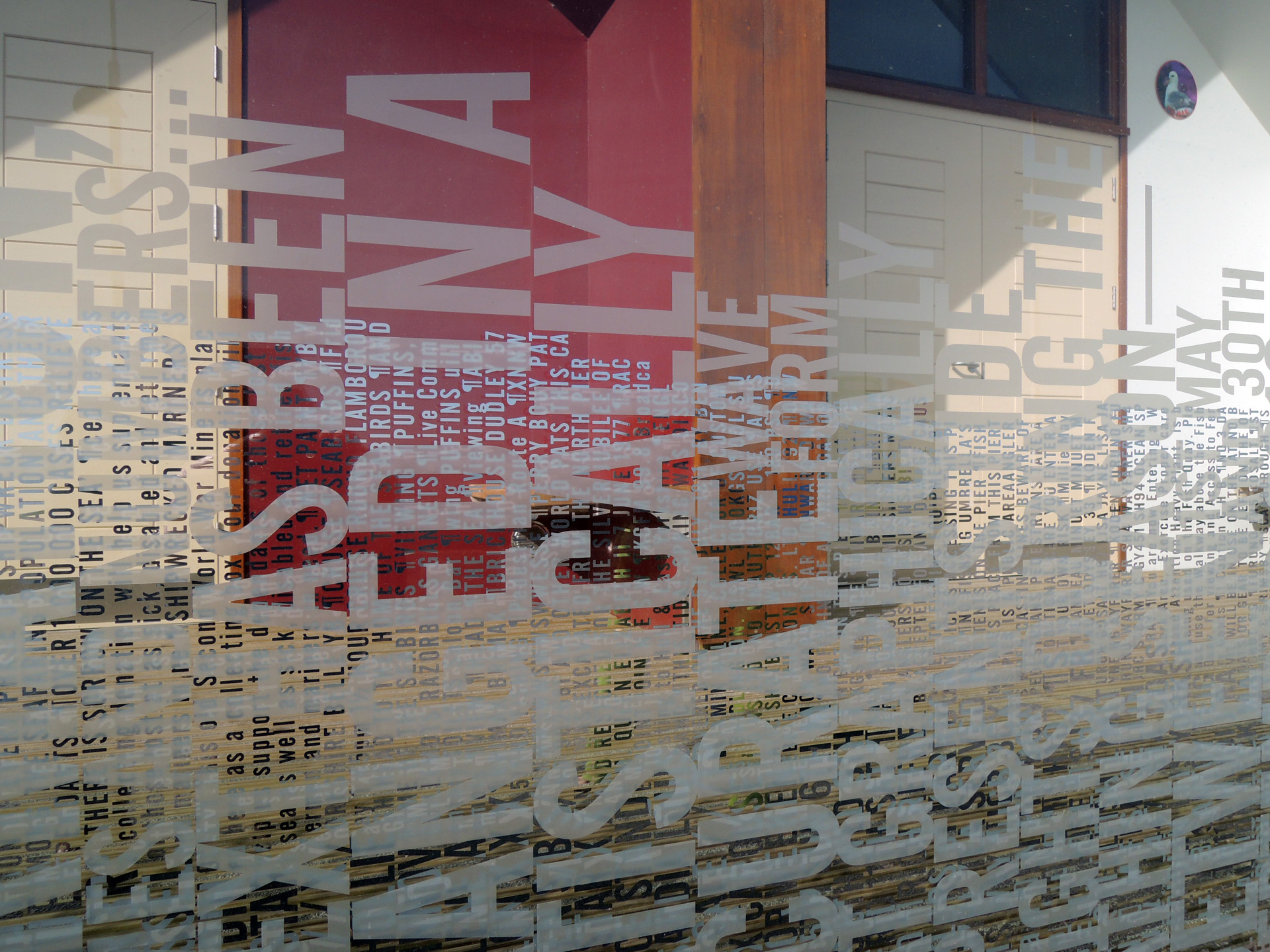
Tidal Wordwave artwork by Adrian Riley and Rachel Welford

=== Awards ===
- 2013: Leeds Architecture Award - commended
- 2016: Northern Design Awards for St Peter's, Monkwearmouth - winner
