= Peter Ransley =

British screenwriter, playwright and novelist (1931–2026)

Peter Edwin Ransley (10 December 1931 – 29 January 2026) was a British screenwriter, playwright and novelist. He also founded the charity Action Against Medical Accidents (AvMA).

== Early life ==
Peter Ransley was born in Yorkshire on 10 December 1931, and grew up in Pudsey, where he attended Pudsey Grammar School. In 1949, he served his national service with the RAF based in Singapore at Changi Airport. He subsequently worked as a trade journalist. In 1964, he was founding editor of Plastics and Rubber Weekly.

== Career ==
Ransley started his writing career on the stage with Ellen and Disabled both at the Hampstead Theatre Club and Granada's Stables Theatre. His play Runaway was shown at the Royal Court. He moved to writing for the radio and television. In the early 1980s, he wrote episodes of Tales of the Unexpected and single plays for the BBC Play for Today Series. His Kate the Good Neighbour won the gold medal in the Commonwealth Film and TV Festival in 1980, while Minor Complications, based on a real case of medical negligence, gained him the Royal Television Society's Writer's Award in 1981.

Television productions included Fallen Angel (ITV 2007), A Good Murder (BBC1 2006) and the BAFTA nominated adaptation of Sarah Waters’ Fingersmith (BBC1 2005). Ransley wrote a number of films, including The Hawk (1993) which starred Helen Mirren and The Cormorant (1995) which starred Ralph Fiennes.

Ransley also focussed on historical fiction with television dramas Bread or Blood (1981) and Seaforth (1994). He subsequently wrote the "Tom Neave" trilogy of novels based around the English civil war (published between 2012 and 2015).

Ransley wrote Wild Boy, a nine year old's quest to find his father, published in 2020.

== Activism ==
In 1980, the BBC aired "Minor Complications" - a Play for Today written by Ransley. The play was based on a real case of medical negligence, and public response to the play led to his setting up AvMA together with his wife Cynthia and its first chief executive, Arnold Simanowitz OBE. AvMA is a UK charity for patient safety and justice, providing free independent advice and support to people affected by medical accidents.

== Personal life and death ==
Ransley lived in West London. He died from bronchopneumonia on 29 January 2026, aged 94. Ransley was survived by his wife Cynthia, children Nicholas and Rebecca, and four grandchildren.
