= Insurance in the United Kingdom =

Insurance in the United Kingdom is a major part of the country's financial services industry, providing life, general and health insurance, as well as reinsurance, to households and businesses. The sector is among the largest in the world and the largest in Europe by premiums, and London is an important international centre for commercial insurance and reinsurance that includes the Lloyd's market.

The United Kingdom insurance market is commonly described in terms of three broad segments: personal and commercial lines insurance, wholesale insurance and life insurance, sold both directly and through intermediaries such as brokers and comparison websites. Insurance firms are mainly regulated under a "twin peaks" framework introduced in 2013, with the Prudential Regulation Authority (PRA) responsible for prudential supervision and the Financial Conduct Authority (FCA) responsible for conduct regulation and the integrity of financial markets, replacing the former Financial Services Authority.

The sector has been affected by a number of high-profile conduct issues. In particular, widespread mis-selling of payment protection insurance (PPI) led to the largest consumer redress exercise in United Kingdom financial services, with tens of billions of pounds in compensation paid to customers and lasting changes to how insurance products are governed and supervised.

== Overview of the UK insurance market ==
=== Market size and structure ===
The United Kingdom insurance and long term savings industry is one of the largest insurance markets in the world and the largest in Europe by premium income. In 2023 the sector wrote about £301 billion in gross premiums and members of the Association of British Insurers (ABI) managed around £1.4 trillion in invested assets. Earlier ABI statistics indicate that the industry contributes around £30 billion each year to the United Kingdom economy, pays more than £16 billion in taxes and employs just over 300,000 people directly and in related services such as broking and other auxiliary activities.

Life and long term savings business accounts for a large share of the sector by assets, with life insurers managing more than £2.3 trillion in customer assets across tens of millions of policies. Non life business, including motor, home, commercial property and liability insurance, produces a high volume of annual premiums and claims. Bank of England data show that United Kingdom authorised non life insurers generated about £124 billion of gross written premiums in 2023.

The London market, including Lloyd's of London and other specialist insurers and reinsurers, is an important global centre for wholesale insurance and reinsurance. Firms in this market underwrite large and complex risks for corporate and international clients and provide capacity to insurers in the United Kingdom and overseas. In 2023 the FCA described wholesale insurance as a fundamental enabler of the United Kingdom and global economy and noted that wholesale insurance firms in the United Kingdom wrote around £55 billion of gross written premiums in 2021. Insurance and reinsurance services also generate a significant export surplus for the United Kingdom.

=== Main lines of business and distribution ===
United Kingdom insurers write a wide range of life and non life products. Life and long term savings business includes protection policies such as term assurance and whole of life insurance, individual and workplace pensions and annuities, and investment and savings products such as unit linked policies. General insurance covers risks such as motor, home, commercial property, liability and travel insurance, as well as a variety of specialist covers. Wholesale insurers in the London market and at Lloyd's underwrite large and complex risks and provide reinsurance capacity to insurers in the United Kingdom and overseas.

Insurance products are sold both directly and through a range of intermediaries. Many customers buy cover from insurers through insurance brokers and other intermediaries, including independent financial advisers for long term savings products. For retail general insurance, price comparison websites have become a key distribution channel, particularly for motor and home insurance. Insurance is also distributed through banks and building societies and through tied arrangements with major retailers and motoring organisations.

Surveys by the Financial Conduct Authority (FCA) suggest that the great majority of adults in the United Kingdom hold at least one insurance product and that many shop around between providers at renewal, particularly for motor and home insurance. The mix of products and distribution channels continues to evolve, influenced by digital platforms, regulatory changes, competition and developments in the wider economy.

=== Climate risk and home insurance ===
Insurers and policymakers have highlighted climate change as an important driver of risk and claims in the UK home insurance market. Industry data show that weather related claims for damage to homes from storms, flooding and frozen pipes reached record levels in 2023 and again in 2024, reflecting a run of named storms and periods of severe cold. In 2024 UK insurers were reported to have paid around £585 million for climate related damage to homes and contents in a single year.

Insurers have warned that more frequent and severe extreme weather could put pressure on the affordability and availability of home insurance, particularly in high risk areas, unless investment in flood defences and climate resilience keeps pace with rising risk.

== Public-private risk sharing ==
=== Flood Re ===
Flood Re is a joint initiative between the UK Government and the insurance industry that aims to keep flood cover for homes at high risk of flooding available and affordable. The scheme began operating in April 2016 and allows participating insurers to cede the flood risk element of eligible household policies to a central reinsurance pool, in return for a premium set by reference to council tax bands. The pool is funded by these premiums and by a statutory levy on all providers of UK household home insurance, set at around £180 million a year.

Flood Re is intended to be temporary and is scheduled to run until 2039, with the aim of supporting a transition to a market where the price of flood insurance fully reflects risk and where properties are more resilient to flooding. The scheme only covers domestic property meeting specified eligibility criteria, including broad cut-off dates for when properties were built, and does not apply to most commercial, buy-to-let or very high value homes. As a result, Flood Re sits alongside other measures such as flood defence investment and planning policy in managing flood risk for households.

=== Pool Re ===
Pool Re is the UK’s government backed terrorism reinsurer for commercial property in Great Britain. It was set up in 1993 by the insurance industry in cooperation with the Government following the Provisional IRA bombing of the Baltic Exchange in London in 1992, which had led to a shortage of affordable terrorism cover. Pool Re is a mutual reinsurer owned by its member insurers and Lloyd’s syndicates. Members retain an initial layer of terrorism losses then cede further losses to the Pool Re scheme.

The scheme is underpinned by an unlimited, but repayable, guarantee from HM Treasury under the Reinsurance (Acts of Terrorism) Act 1993. This allows insurers to continue to offer terrorism cover to businesses, confident that claims can be met even in the event of a very large attack. Over time, Pool Re has expanded its cover to include non-damage business interruption and has built up significant reserves and commercial reinsurance protection. The Office for Budget Responsibility describes it as a long running example of government guaranteed insurance against systemic risk.

== Regulation and supervision ==
=== Regulatory framework ===
Financial regulation of insurance in the United Kingdom is based on the Financial Services and Markets Act 2000 (and later amendments, including the Financial Services Act 2012). Until 2013 most financial services firms, including insurers, were authorised and supervised by the Financial Services Authority (FSA). Following the global financial crisis, the government reformed the framework and the FSA was replaced in April 2013 by the Prudential Regulation Authority (PRA) and the Financial Conduct Authority (FCA).

The PRA is part of the Bank of England and is responsible for the prudential regulation and supervision of banks, building societies, credit unions, insurers and certain investment firms. It sets prudential standards and supervises firms to promote their safety and soundness and to contribute to an appropriate degree of protection for insurance policyholders. The FCA is a separate body and is responsible for conduct regulation of most retail and wholesale financial markets. Its objectives include securing an appropriate degree of protection for consumers, protecting and enhancing the integrity of the United Kingdom financial system and promoting effective competition in the interests of consumers.

=== Prudential regulation ===
The PRA authorises most United Kingdom insurers and reinsurers and supervises them on a risk based basis, focusing on the impact they could have on the stability of the financial system and on policyholders. Its approach includes assessing firms' business models, governance, risk management, capital and liquidity, and intervening where necessary to reduce risks.

United Kingdom insurers are subject to prudential requirements that implement the Solvency II Directive and related domestic rules. These include quantitative capital standards based on a risk sensitive solvency capital requirement, rules on the valuation of assets and liabilities and tests of firms' ability to continue to meet their obligations under stressed conditions. The PRA also sets expectations for insurers' risk management and governance, including the responsibilities of boards and senior managers.

=== Conduct regulation and consumer protection ===
The FCA is responsible for regulating how insurance firms design, sell and administer products and how intermediaries distribute them. Firms must meet the FCA's Principles for Businesses, including the requirement to treat customers fairly, and detailed rules in its Insurance Conduct of Business Sourcebook and other parts of the FCA Handbook. The FCA supervises firms using a combination of data, thematic work and firm specific reviews, and can take enforcement action where it finds serious misconduct.

Consumer protection in insurance involves a number of complementary bodies. The Financial Services Compensation Scheme (FSCS) provides compensation if an authorised insurer or insurance intermediary fails and is unable to meet claims. For most compulsory insurance and long term insurance the FSCS covers 100 percent of valid claims, while many other general insurance claims are protected at 90 percent, subject to eligibility rules set by the regulators. The Financial Ombudsman Service (FOS) offers a free dispute resolution service for consumers and small businesses that have unresolved complaints with insurers or intermediaries, and can require firms to pay compensation where it considers that a consumer has been treated unfairly.

== Taxation of insurance business ==
=== Legal framework ===
Insurance companies operating in the United Kingdom are subject to corporation tax on their profits. The detailed rules differ between life and non life business and are set out in primary legislation, including the Finance Act 2012 and the Corporation Tax Act 2010, and in HM Revenue & Customs (HMRC) guidance such as the Life Assurance Manual and General Insurance Manual. The 2012 reforms introduced a new life tax regime for accounting periods beginning on or after 1 January 2013, replacing earlier provisions in the Income and Corporation Taxes Act 1988 that had governed the taxation of life assurance and related business.

Corporation tax is charged on the profits of the insurance company rather than directly on individual policies. For life companies, the law distinguishes several categories of long term business, including basic life assurance and general annuity business (BLAGAB), pension business and other non BLAGAB categories, which may be taxed on different bases. Companies that write general insurance are normally taxed on their underwriting results and associated investment income on the same trading basis as other companies, subject to specific rules for insurance contracts.

Insurance business is affected by Insurance Premium Tax (IPT), a separate tax on most general insurance premiums. HMRC guidance explains that IPT is charged at a standard rate of 12 percent for most taxable premiums and a higher rate of 20 percent for certain types of insurance, such as travel insurance and some insurance sold with vehicles and domestic appliances. Most long term insurance and reinsurance is exempt from IPT.

=== Life and non-life business ===
For tax purposes, life assurance business covers contracts that provide benefits linked to human life, including protection policies, savings policies and pensions business. Finance Act 2012 defines life assurance business and sets out the main tax categories of long term business, including BLAGAB and pension business, and treats certain capital redemption business as life assurance business for these purposes. HMRC guidance notes that other types of long term insurance, such as some permanent health insurance, may fall outside BLAGAB and be taxed on a different basis.

Non life, or general, insurance business includes motor, home, commercial property, liability, travel and many other forms of short term cover. HMRC’s General Insurance Manual explains that companies writing general insurance are normally taxed on their trade profits under corporation tax rules, with premiums, claims, changes in technical provisions and most investment income all taken into account in computing taxable profit. In practice, some companies write both life and non life business, and the tax rules require their life, general and other activities to be identified and taxed on the appropriate basis.

=== Basic life assurance and general annuity business ===
Basic life assurance and general annuity business (BLAGAB) is the main category of life assurance business for United Kingdom tax purposes. Broadly, it includes long term savings and investment policies and related annuity contracts that are not pension business or other specialised categories. Under the modern regime introduced by Finance Act 2012, BLAGAB is taxed on an "I minus E" basis, where corporation tax is charged on the excess of certain investment income and gains (I) over management expenses and other specified deductions (E), subject to detailed rules and limits.

The I minus E basis reflects the fact that, for many BLAGAB contracts, the investment return belongs economically to policyholders rather than shareholders. The tax system therefore aims to tax policyholder investment returns within the life company, with an allowance for expenses, while other elements of profit remain subject to the normal trading rules. HMRC’s Life Assurance Manual provides worked examples of how the I minus E calculation operates in practice and explains how business is allocated between BLAGAB and other categories.

=== Pension business ===
For insurers, "pension business" is a defined category of long term business that broadly covers contracts which provide benefits under registered pension schemes. Earlier legislation set out this definition in section 431B of the Income and Corporation Taxes Act 1988. For accounting periods beginning on or after 1 January 2013 the definition was rewritten in Finance Act 2012, which now provides the main statutory tests. HMRC guidance explains that pension business for life companies includes the writing of annuities and other contracts that secure or provide retirement benefits and that this business is generally taxed on a trading profit basis rather than on the I minus E basis used for most BLAGAB.

At the level of the policyholder, the United Kingdom has used a system of tax reliefs and limits to encourage long term saving. A key feature was the lifetime allowance, introduced on 6 April 2006 as part of a package of pensions tax simplification, which limited the total value of tax advantaged pension savings an individual could build up without incurring additional tax charges. Following changes announced in the Spring Budget 2023, the lifetime allowance charge was removed for 2023/24 and the lifetime allowance itself was abolished from 6 April 2024, with new lump sum allowances introduced instead. These changes alter how pension benefits are taxed for individuals but do not change the basic distinction, for insurers, between pension business and other categories of life assurance business.

== History ==
=== Early development and Lloyd's ===
Insurance in what is now the United Kingdom has medieval roots, but the modern market developed alongside international trade from the seventeenth century. Marine insurance was written in London in the 1500s and became increasingly organised in the coffee houses of the City during the 1600s, as merchants and underwriters gathered to share shipping news and spread risk. The Great Fire of London in 1666 highlighted the need for protection against property damage. In the decades that followed, early fire insurance companies were founded in London, including the Fire Office and Sun Fire Office, and the practice of insuring buildings against fire spread to other towns and overseas markets.

Lloyd's of London traces its origins to Edward Lloyd's coffee house, first recorded in 1688 as a meeting place for shipowners, merchants and underwriters. Over the eighteenth and nineteenth centuries Lloyd's developed into a formal subscription market, supported by the Lloyd's Acts and the creation of the Society of Lloyd's, and became an important centre for marine insurance and later for other specialist risks. By the 1700s and 1800s the United Kingdom had a range of fire, accident and life offices, often backed by private capital and using emerging actuarial techniques to price risk. The Methodist Church established its own insurance company in 1872.

=== Twentieth century expansion ===
During the late nineteenth and early twentieth centuries the United Kingdom insurance market expanded as industrialisation and urbanisation created new risks and demand for cover. Specialist accident and liability policies were developed for railways, factories and steam boilers, and insurers adapted products for new technologies such as the car and aeroplane. The first motor policies in the United Kingdom were written in the 1890s. In 1930 the Road Traffic Act introduced compulsory third party motor insurance, requiring drivers to be insured for their liability to third parties and making the United Kingdom one of the first countries to mandate motor cover.

The two world wars had a major impact on insurers and their policyholders, bringing new classes of risk, large losses and changes in investment patterns. Wartime conditions and the growth of the welfare state altered the balance between private and state provision, but private insurance remained an important part of household and business risk management. In the post war period the London market, including Lloyd's and company markets, developed into a leading global centre for complex and high value risks and an important hub for reinsurance, while domestic insurers expanded into new areas of personal and commercial insurance.

The structure of the industry evolved. Mutual and proprietary insurers consolidated through mergers and acquisitions, and foreign insurers increased their presence in the United Kingdom market in the second half of the twentieth century. In 1985 several specialist trade bodies merged to form the Association of British Insurers (ABI), which became the main trade association for insurers and long term savings providers in the United Kingdom (excluding Lloyd's and its members).

=== European integration and recent reforms ===
From the 1970s onwards, the regulation of United Kingdom insurers was increasingly influenced by European Union legislation. A series of life and non life insurance directives, followed by the single market programme, set common standards for authorisation, solvency and cross border business within the European Economic Community and later the European Union. The Solvency II Directive, which came into force on 1 January 2016, introduced a comprehensive risk based framework for capital, governance and disclosure, and allowed insurers authorised in one member state to write business across the European Union under a "single passport".

The United Kingdom's departure from the European Union led to further changes. Under the European Union (Withdrawal) Act 2018 and related regulations, Solvency II and other European rules were onshored into United Kingdom law, with technical amendments to ensure that they continued to operate after Brexit. The government and regulators then launched a review of Solvency II to tailor the regime to the United Kingdom market. Policy statements published in 2024 describe the emerging "Solvency UK" framework, which retains many Solvency II concepts but reforms areas such as the risk margin, matching adjustment and reporting in order to support competitiveness and investment while maintaining policyholder protection.

Other recent developments include the growth of digital distribution, the use of telematics and data analytics in underwriting and pricing, and increased attention to climate related risks and wider environmental, social and governance (ESG) issues in insurance and investment.

== Controversies ==
=== Payment protection insurance ===
One of the most significant conduct issues affecting the United Kingdom insurance sector has been the mis selling of payment protection insurance (PPI). PPI policies were widely sold alongside loans, credit cards and other credit products to cover repayments if the borrower became unable to pay because of illness, unemployment or death. Regulators and courts found that, in many cases, PPI had been sold to customers who did not need it or could not claim on it, and that high levels of undisclosed commission had been added to premiums.

The Financial Conduct Authority introduced rules and guidance to ensure that firms handled PPI complaints fairly and, following a publicity campaign, set a deadline of 29 August 2019 for consumers to complain to the firms that sold the policies. FCA data shows that between January 2011 and December 2019 firms paid about £38.3 billion in PPI refunds and compensation to customers, making it the largest consumer redress exercise in United Kingdom financial services. The PPI experience influenced later reforms to product governance, disclosure and redress arrangements for insurance and other retail financial products.

=== General insurance pricing and loyalty penalties ===
The pricing of retail general insurance, particularly home and motor policies, has been a long running area of scrutiny. An FCA market study into general insurance pricing practices found that some insurers charged significantly higher renewal premiums to longstanding customers than to new customers with a similar risk profile, a practice often referred to as "price walking" or the "loyalty penalty". In May 2021 the FCA confirmed a package of remedies, including new rules requiring firms to ensure that renewal quotes for home and motor insurance customers are no higher than the equivalent new business price for the same firm, as well as measures to improve product value and communications.

These changes, which took effect from January 2022, are intended to reduce cross subsidisation between customers, strengthen competition and support fair value in line with the FCA's wider Consumer Duty and fair value initiatives.

=== Add-on insurance and value concerns ===
The sale of insurance as an add on to another product has raised concerns. In 2014 the FCA's general insurance add ons market study found that competition in add on markets was often not working well for consumers and that many customers were paying too much for products that offered poor value or did not meet their needs. The study highlighted issues in several add on lines, including travel, gadget, home emergency, personal accident and guaranteed asset protection (GAP) insurance.

Following this work the FCA introduced remedies such as banning pre ticked boxes for add ons, requiring clearer information on price and coverage, and developing value measures and reporting requirements to improve transparency. In 2024 the FCA reported that GAP insurance in particular was often not providing fair value and required a number of firms to pause sales while they improved their value assessments and product design.

=== Premium finance and affordability ===
Many policyholders pay for motor and home insurance in monthly instalments using premium finance arrangements. FCA research has found that these arrangements can involve relatively high annual percentage rates and fees compared with other forms of credit and that customers who choose, or are forced by affordability, to pay monthly can end up paying significantly more overall than those who pay annually. In some cases regulators and commentators have raised concerns about "double dipping", where customers who opt to pay monthly are charged both higher underlying premiums and interest on the financed amount.

The FCA's premium finance market study, launched in 2024, is examining whether consumers are receiving fair value from premium finance and how firms should manage distribution, pricing and disclosure.

=== Business interruption insurance and COVID-19 ===
During the COVID-19 pandemic, many businesses in the United Kingdom made claims under business interruption insurance policies for losses arising from public health restrictions. There was significant uncertainty and dispute over whether standard policy wordings covered losses arising from the pandemic. To provide clarity, the FCA brought a test case under the Financial Markets Test Case Scheme. On 15 January 2021 the Supreme Court substantially allowed the FCA's appeals and dismissed insurers' appeals in FCA v Arch Insurance (UK) Ltd and others [2021] UKSC 1, confirming that many non damage business interruption policies provided cover for COVID 19 related losses.

The judgment and subsequent regulatory guidance required insurers to reassess and pay valid claims more quickly and provided guidance on how policyholders could evidence the presence of coronavirus in the relevant area. The test case is regarded as a significant example of the use of a representative action to resolve widespread uncertainty in insurance coverage.

=== Motor injury claims and whiplash reforms ===
Motor insurance claims costs in the United Kingdom have been influenced by reforms to low value road traffic personal injury claims, particularly those involving whiplash. The Civil Liability Act 2018 and related secondary legislation introduced a statutory definition of whiplash injury, a tariff of fixed damages for whiplash and minor psychological injuries, a higher small claims limit for most road traffic injury claims, and a ban on settling whiplash claims without medical evidence.

Since 31 May 2021 most straightforward low value road traffic injury claims have been expected to be made through the Official Injury Claim online portal, which is intended for use by unrepresented claimants as well as by legal professionals. Parliament has considered the impact of these reforms on claim numbers, compensation levels, access to justice and motor insurance premiums. Insurers have argued that the reforms should reduce claims costs and help contain premiums, while some consumer and claimant groups have expressed concern about barriers for injured people using the system.

=== Personal injury discount rate ===
Very serious motor and liability claims in the United Kingdom are affected by the personal injury discount rate, sometimes called the Ogden rate, which is used by courts to calculate lump-sum damages for future losses. Following a statutory review, the Lord Chancellor announced in December 2024 that the rate for England and Wales would increase from minus 0.25 percent to plus 0.5 percent with effect from 11 January 2025.

Commentary by actuarial and legal firms suggests that the increase in the discount rate is expected to reduce the cost of very large personal injury claims compared with the previous rate and may therefore ease some pressure on motor and liability insurance premiums, although other cost drivers remain important.

=== Other issues ===
The United Kingdom insurance sector has been involved in other conduct issues and redress exercises, including concerns about claims handling, value for money and the clarity of policy wordings. These have been addressed through enforcement action, thematic work and wider regulatory initiatives such as the Consumer Duty, which requires firms to demonstrate that insurance products provide fair value and good outcomes for customers across their lifecycle. In the wider retail financial services market, large scale redress programmes have also been proposed for issues such as mis sold motor finance commission arrangements, which have been compared in scale to the PPI redress exercise, although these relate to consumer credit rather than insurance contracts.

== See also ==
- Financial services in the United Kingdom
- Insurance
- Lloyd's of London
- Insurance in Australia
- Insurance in the United States
- Pensions in the United Kingdom
- National Insurance
- Payment protection insurance
- Solvency II Directive
- Prudential Regulation Authority
- Financial Conduct Authority
- Financial Services Compensation Scheme
- Financial Ombudsman Service
