= Pudsey Park =

Park in Pudsey, England

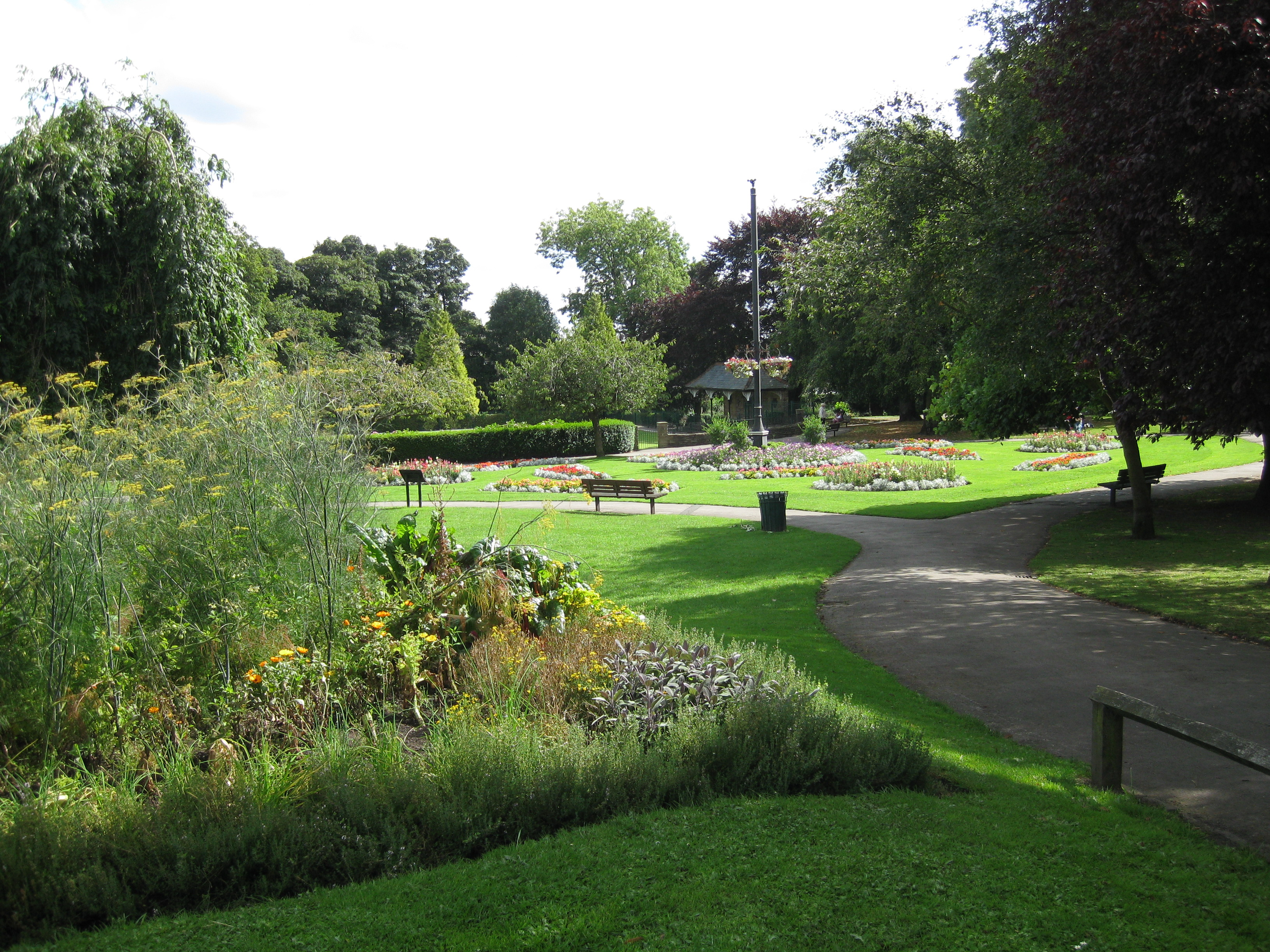
- Pathway and flowerbeds in Pudsey Park
- Interactive map of Pudsey Park
- Location: Pudsey, West Yorkshire
- Nearest city: Leeds
- Coordinates: 53.794°N 1.665°W
- Area: 7.5 hectares (19 acres)
- Operator: Leeds City Council
- Awards: Green Flag

Pudsey Park is a public park in Pudsey, West Yorkshire, England, approximately 5 miles (8 km) west of Leeds city centre. The park is the second most popular in Leeds after Roundhay Park.

Facilities include a playground, a skate park, a bowling green, and a café.

The park did have a visitor centre, which hosted local wildlife displays. This centre has now closed, as from April 2021 due to council funding cuts.

A road roller vehicle was gifted to the park in 1959 after it was no longer required by the West Riding County Council. It was used by children to play on until it was removed in 1990 due to fears of asbestos flaking off the vehicle. A campaign is underway to restore the road roller to working condition.
