= Duty of candour =

Legal duty of British public authorities

In UK public law, the duty of candour is the duty imposed on a public authority "not to seek to win [a] litigation at all costs but to assist the court in reaching the correct result and thereby to improve standards in public administration". Lord Donaldson MR in R v Lancashire County Council ex p. Huddleston stated that public servants should be willing "to explain fully what has occurred and why".

There is also a duty of candour referred to in various contexts as a professional, contractual or statutory duty, which is imposed on all NHS and non-NHS providers of services to NHS patients in the UK to "provide to the service user and any other relevant person all necessary support and all relevant information" in the event that a "reportable patient safety incident" occurs. A "reportable patient safety incident" is one which could have or did result in moderate or severe harm or death. The statutory duty of candour is provided for in Regulation 20 of the Health and Social Care Act 2008 (Regulated Activities) Regulations 2014. and included within NHS England's standard contract clauses. Organisations which fail to comply with the statutory duty may be fined.

Other organisations outside the public sector may also choose to adopt a "duty of candour policy", for example the Scout Association did so in July 2024, applying the policy specifically to safety and safeguarding incidents which result in actual or perceived harm.

== History ==
Campaigner Will Powell led a campaign for NHS managers and doctors to have a formal 'duty of candour' when dealing with complaints about negligence or poor standards of care in NHS hospitals.

Statutory proposals affecting the NHS were announced by Health Secretary Andrew Lansley in October 2011, initially undertaking a consultation exercise which ran until January 2012.

In January 2014 David Behan, chief executive of the Care Quality Commission (CQC), threw his weight behind a wide definition for the statutory duty of candour which was recommended by the Francis Report. The Government originally intended the duty to be limited to cases of “severe harm” – when a patient had been killed or left permanently disabled, as a wider reporting requirement could inundate organisations with unnecessary bureaucracy. The CQC estimates there are about 11,000 incidents of severe harm per year, and up to 100,000 incidents of serious harm, although there may be significant under-reporting of both. The charity Action Against Medical Accidents has been campaigning for a wide definition and Behan made it clear that he was supporting them.

The CQC undertook a consultation exercise in 2018 and issued updated guidance in 2021, noting the importance of a "heartfelt apology" as a part of the process of correcting harm.

== See also ==
- Doctor–patient relationship
- Duty of disclosure
- Information disclosure statement
