= Crawshaw Academy =

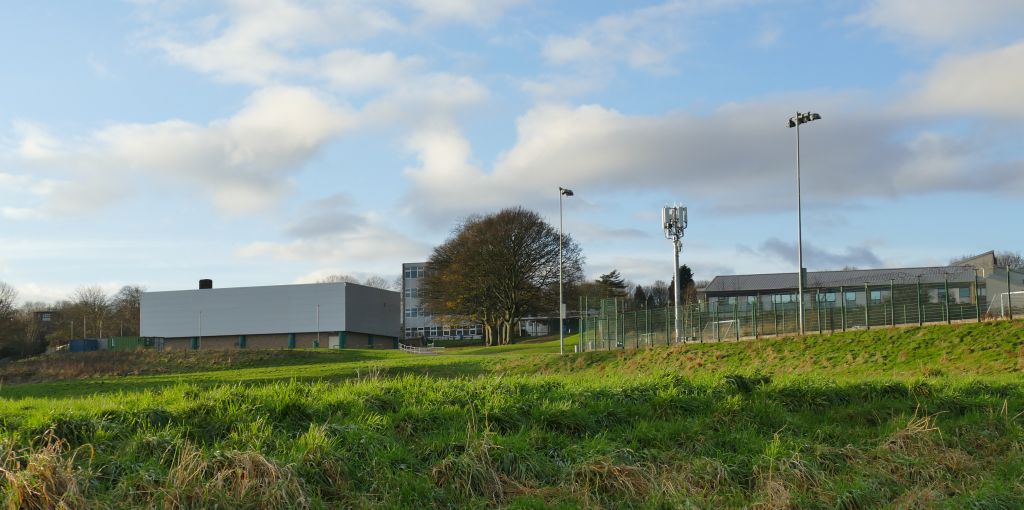
- View of the school (2020)

Location
- Robin Lane; Pudsey, West Yorkshire, LS28 9HU; England
- Coordinates: 53.79235°N 1.65670°W

Information
- Type: Academy
- Motto: "Respect, Integrity, Determination"
- Local authority: City of Leeds
- Department for Education URN: 138304 Tables
- Ofsted: Reports
- Headteacher: Iain Addison
- Gender: Mixed
- Age: 11 to 18
- Enrolment: 1,163
- Colours: Blue, Black, & Silver
- Website: http://www.crawshawacademy.org.uk/

Crawshaw Academy (formerly Crawshaw School) is a secondary school with academy status in Pudsey, West Yorkshire, England. The Crawshaw Academy logo is a blue and silver shield with motto "Excellence, Purpose, Ambition". The shield features a tree and a crow representing the heritage and history of the area of Pudsey within which the school stands, Craw - Crow and Shaw - Forest.

== History ==
In 1994 the School was visited by Conservative MP and former health secretary, Virginia Bottomley, who praised the fire resistance of the school buildings. Despite this praise, a fire started by "carelessly discarded smoking material" burnt down a large part of the old school buildings; an extensive and prolonged rebuilding scheme has since taken place. Crawshaw School reopened as "Crawshaw Academy" on 1 September 2014 and is the first Interserve Academy, part of the Interserve Academies Trust. In November 2015, the first Ofsted inspection of the Academy after its corporate sponsorship reported it as "Good", having improved on the previous report from less than two years earlier.

== Academic Rating ==
In 2005 the school gained specialist humanities status. The 2011 Ofsted inspection report rated the school as overall grade 2 (good), but in January 2014 it was placed in special measures. In 2019 its Ofsted School Report was rated Good in all categories of effectiveness.
