= Financial Conduct Authority Handbook =

UK financial services rules

The Financial Conduct Authority Handbook is a set of rules required to be followed by banks, insurers, investment businesses and other financial services in the United Kingdom under the Financial Services and Markets Act 2000. It is administered by the Financial Conduct Authority in London.

== See also ==
- UK company law
- UK public service law
- UK banking law
- FCA Controlled Functions
