= The Hawk (1993 film) =

- Theatrical release poster
- Directed by: David Hayman
- Written by: Peter Ransley
- Produced by: Eileen Quinn; Ann Wingate
- Starring: Helen Mirren; George Costigan; Rosemary Leach; Owen Teale; Melanie Hill
- Cinematography: Andrew Dunn
- Edited by: Justin Krish
- Music by: Nick Bicât
- Production companies: BBC Films; Initial Pictures
- Distributed by: Feature Film Company
- Release date: 3 December 1993
- Running time: 88 minutes
- Country: United Kingdom
- Language: English
- Budget: £1.8 million
- Box office: £0.2 million (UK/US)

The Hawk is a 1993 British film starring Helen Mirren, George Costigan, Rosemary Leach, Owen Teale and Melanie Hill.

== Plot ==
The film tells the story of a serial killer, known by the police as The Hawk, who preys on women in the North of England. He sexually assaults the victims before striking them with a hammer and picking out their insides, like a hawk, hence his nickname.

Meanwhile, Annie Marsh is a housewife living in the area of where the killings are taking place, with her husband, Stephen and their two young children. Stephen is often away on business, but Annie soon notices that he is away whenever the killer strikes. To make matters worse, Annie was once institutionalized due to a mental illness. Is she crazy? Or is her husband a knife-wielding murderer?

== Cast ==
- Helen Mirren as Annie Marsh
- George Costigan as Stephen Marsh
- Rosemary Leach as Mrs. Marsh
- Owen Teale as Ken Marsh
- Melanie Hill as Norma

== Reception ==
The film opened in the UK on 3 December 1993 on 44 screens and grossed £58,429 for the weekend, placing 12th at the UK box office. It went on to gross £199,000. In the United States and Canada it grossed $8,906.
