= David Behan =

British business person

Sir David Behan CBE
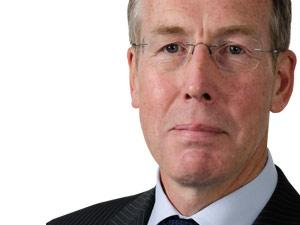

Interim Chair of the Office for Students
- Incumbent
- Assumed office 26 July 2024
- Prime Minister: Keir Starmer
- Preceded by: James Wharton

Chair of Health Education England
- In office 1 December 2018 – 3 April 2023
- Prime Minister: Theresa May(2016-2019) Boris Johnson (2019–2022); Liz Truss (2022) Rishi Sunak (2022–2023)
- Health Secretary: Jeremy Hunt (2012-2018) Matt Hancock (2018-2021); Sajid Javid (2021-2022); Steve Barclay (2022, 2022–2023) Thérèse Coffey(2022)

Personal details
- Born: November 1955 (age 70) Blackburn, Lancashire
- Education: Bradford University
- Website: Profile

Sir David Behan CBE (born November 1955) is a British public servant who was previously the Chair of Health Education England. Following the merger of Health Education England into NHS England, Behan, now serves as a group non-executive director and chairs the Workforce, Training and Education Committee.

== Career ==
Sir David was born and brought up in Blackburn in Lancashire and graduated from Bradford University in 1978. Behan began his career as a social worker, progressing as a manager in Wakefield, Avon and Cleveland. He was appointed to Director of Social Services posts in Cleveland, Middlesbrough and Greenwich. He was the President of the Association of Directors of Social Services between 2002 and 2003.

Behan was the first Chief Inspector of the Commission for Social Care Inspection in 2003. In 2006, he was appointed to the Department of Health as the Director General for Social Care, Local Government and Care Partnerships working on personalised care, carers learning and disability policy, mental health policy, the reform of social care funding and legislation. He was also a member of the NHS Management Board. In 2012, he was appointed to the role of Chief Executive of the Care Quality Commission where he has led a team to conduct a fundamental review of the quality and safety regulation of health and care in England.

He was said by the Health Service Journal to be the seventh-most powerful person in the English NHS in December 2013, and in 2015 the fifth.

In January 2014, he supported a wide definition for the statutory duty of candour which was recommended by the Francis Report.

The Government originally intended the duty to be limited to cases of "severe harm" – when a patient had been killed or left permanently disabled, as a wider reporting requirement could inundate organisations with unnecessary bureaucracy. The CQC estimates there are about 11,000 incidents of severe harm per year, and up to 100,000 incidents of serious harm, although there may be significant under reporting of both. The charity Action Against Medical Accidents has been campaigning for a wide definition, which Behan supports.

In the 2004 New Year Honours, Behan was appointed a Commander of the Order of the British Empire (CBE) for services to social care. In 2004, he was awarded an Honorary Doctorate in Law by Greenwich University. He was presented with a City and Guilds fellowship in October 2016 and awarded an Honorary Doctorate in Health by the University of Bradford in 2017. In the 2017 New Year Honours he was knighted for services to health and care.

In November 2018, he was appointed as a non-executive director for HC-One, the largest care home operator in Britain. That same month, it was announced that Behan would be the chair of Health Education England from 1 December 2018. Behan joined the HC-One board as a non-executive director in November 2018 and became Chairman in November 2019, following the retirement of Dr Chai Patel CBE from the position.

In July 2024, Behan was appointed as Interim Chair for the Office for Students.

== Views ==
Behan wants to see more investment in social care in England. He maintains 1.2 million older people who need help with basic care for washing, dressing, eating are not getting it. Behan stated, "What’s disappointing, I have to say, is we’ve not seen a similar investment [to the NHS] in social care. The creation of the NHS by Attlee and [Aneurin] Bevan in 1948 took remarkable political courage and I think there will need to be remarkable political courage to [put] adult social care [on a stable footing]. What we now need is a long-term funding settlement for social care which sits alongside the long-term funding settlement for the NHS." Behan also wants to see increased funding for mental health services.

In November 2018, Behan said that he advocated the creation of a compulsory insurance scheme with payments taken out of salaries, and for equity to be taken out of pensioners' homes in order to pay for care. He considered that the UK government had not been brave enough to make the decision to reform the system in contrast to Germany and Japan, which implemented similar reforms.

In March 2020, Behan posited that physiotherapists, social prescribers, and clinical pharmacists can work in general practice on tasks previously undertaken by general practitioners.
