= Senior Managers Regime =

UK banking regulation

The Senior Managers and Certification Regime (SM&CR) applies to the United Kingdom banking sector since March 2016 and to dual-regulated insurers since December 2018. SM&CR has been put in place to reduce financial service consumer harm and strengthen market integrity by making individuals accountable for their conduct and competence. The Financial Conduct Authority (FCA) describes SM&CR as an opportunity for financial institutes to establish healthy cultures and effective governance by encouraging individual accountability and setting standards for personal conduct.

== Background ==
The SM&CR legislation was formed in response to the 2008 financial crisis and significant conduct failings such as the Libor scandal. UK Parliament passed the proposed legislation in December 2013, leading to the FCA and Prudential Regulation Authority (PRA) applying the legislation to the banking sector from March 2016. Parliament made further legislative changes in May 2016, extending the regime to all FSMA authorised firms. SM&CR replaced the preceding Approved Persons Regime.

== Applicability ==
The legislation applies to all FCA/PRA regulated banking sector institutes. This includes: banks, building societies, credit unions, UK branches of foreign banks and the largest UK investment institutes. It also applies to all FCA/PRA regulated insurance and reinsurance institutes. This includes: insurers and reinsurers, ISPVs, the Society of Lloyd's, managing agents and UK branches of foreign insurers.

== Key components ==
- Senior Managers Regime
- Certification Regime
- Conduct Rules

=== Senior Managers Regime ===
The most senior staff at institutes where SM&CR apply, who perform key roles, are designated as 'Senior Managers'. Senior Managers must be approved by FCA or PRA before commencing their roles. Senior Managers must also have a 'statement of responsibilities' where their responsibilities and accountability is documented. This statement must be part of the institute's overarching 'responsibilities map' and shall cover 'prescribed responsibilities' and 'overall responsibilities' (legislative texts). Institutes must also annually re-certify all Senior Managers as suitable to perform their roles.

=== Certification Regime ===
Staff at SM&CR institutes holding roles that can cause significant harm to the institute (or customers) are designated as 'Certification Functions'. Certification Function role holders do not require FCA/PRA approval, but the institute must annually re-certify that they are suitable ('fit and proper') to perform their role.

=== Conduct rules ===
Most staff engaged in financial services activities at SM&CR institutes are affected by the so-called conduct rules. These are minimum standards for individual behaviour with the aim to improve accountability and awareness of conduct issues across the institute.

== See also ==
- FCA Controlled Functions
- Consumer Duty
