= Death of a Salesman (1996 film) =

- Based on: Death of a Salesman by Arthur Miller
- Screenplay by: Arthur Miller
- Directed by: David Thacker
- Starring: Warren Mitchell; Rosemary Harris; Iain Glen; Owen Teale
- Music by: Adrian Johnston
- Country of origin: United Kingdom
- Original language: English

Production
- Producer: Anne Brogan
- Editor: St. John O'Rorke
- Running time: 136 minutes

Original release
- Network: BBC
- Release: 1996

Death of a Salesman is a 1996 British made-for-television film adaptation of the 1949 play of the same name by Arthur Miller. It was directed by David Thacker and starred Warren Mitchell as Willy Loman. Mitchell reprised the role for which he had won the West End theatre Laurence Olivier Award for Actor of the Year in a Revival in 1979.

== Cast ==
- Warren Mitchell as Willy Loman
- Rosemary Harris as Linda
- Iain Glen as Biff
- Owen Teale as Happy
- Juliet Aubrey as Miss Forsythe
- Pam Ferris as Woman
- James Grout as Charley
- Ian Hogg as Ben
- Matthew Marsh as Howard
