= Pudsey Grammar School =

Foundation school in Pudsey, West Yorkshire, England

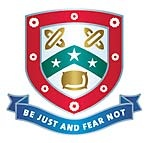

Location
- Mount Pleasant Road; Pudsey, West Yorkshire, LS28 7ND; England; 53.79884°N 1.66290°W

Information
- Type: Foundation School
- Motto: "Be Just and fear not"
- Established: 1905
- Local authority: City of Leeds
- Trust: 21st Century Learning Partnership
- Specialist: Mathematics and computing
- Department for Education URN: 108079 Tables
- Ofsted: Reports
- Chair: David Webster
- Headteacher: Mark McKelvie
- Gender: Coeducational
- Age: 11 to 18
- Website: http://www.pudseygrammar.co.uk/

Pudsey Grammar School formerly Pudsey Grangefield School is a secondary school with a sixth form in Pudsey, West Yorkshire, England. It serves over 1300 pupils from the town and surrounding area. The school has a large Sixth Form of over 260 students offering 20 A level courses and 6 Applied General courses.

== History ==
It was first established in 1905 under the name Pudsey and District Secondary School, meeting in Pudsey Town Hall until the school's first purpose-built building opened on Richardshaw Lane in 1911, with construction having started in mid-1909. The name changed to Pudsey Grammar School in 1944 and was known by this name until 1980 at which point the name changed to Pudsey Grangefield School. It was later given the status of a specialist college of Maths and Computing. In September 2021 the school changed its name back to Pudsey Grammar School.

The school's logo is the coat of arms of Pudsey, bearing the slogan "Be Just and Fear Not". The logo is built into the face of the original Grammar School Building; this Grade II listed building at the front of the old site has been converted into flats, and the rest of the site was demolished to make an open recreational area for the new building.

The school has only had six Headteachers since 1911. On 21 September 2009, the school was visited by the Deputy Prime Minister, John Prescott. The school was later visited in 2010 by Labour leadership candidate and former Foreign Secretary David Miliband, who described the new building as "a great monument to Labour government" . Furthemore Matthew Lewis who played Neville Longbottom in the Harry Potter Films, visited the school on 30th November 2016.

== Behaviour Hub ==
In April 2022 Pudsey Grammar School was named as part of the expansion of the Department for Education's national Behaviour Hubs programme as one of only 18 Lead Secondary schools nationally. This is in recognition of the school's 'exemplary behaviour culture'.

== Notable former pupils ==
- Jerry Brotton, Chair of Renaissance Studies at Queen Mary, University of London and presenter of the BBC series Maps: Power, Plunder and Possession
- Carolynne Good, finalist on Fame Academy
- Matthew Hoggard, England cricketer
- Adrian Riley, artist and designer
- Nile Wilson, Olympic gymnastics bronze medallist on the horizontal bar in Summer 2016

=== Pudsey Grammar School ===
- Sir Len Hutton, opening batsman for England and Yorkshire
- Peter Ransley, screenwriter
- David Shutt, Baron Shutt of Greetland OBE
- Dudley Williams FRS, Professor of Biological Chemistry from 1996 to 2006 at the University of Cambridge; his work led to effectiveness of the antibiotic vancomycin
