= Action Against Medical Accidents =

- Website: www.avma.org.uk

Action against Medical Accidents (AvMA) is a UK charity for patient safety and justice. It works with people who have been affected by medical accidents. It is based in Surrey.

The charity provides free, independent advice and support to people affected by medical accidents (in particular, lapses in patient safety) through a helpline, written casework, and inquest support services.

It also works in partnership with patients, health professionals, the NHS, government departments, and lawyers to improve patient safety and justice for people affected by medical accidents. AvMA is a registered charity in England & Wales (No: 299123) and Scotland (No: 2239250/ SCO 39683).

== History ==
AvMA was originally established in 1982 as ‘Action for the Victims of Medical Accidents’ following public reaction to the television play ‘Minor Complications’, by AvMA's founder, Peter Ransley. The name was changed in 2003 to ‘Action against Medical Accidents’.

Since its inception, AvMA has provided advice and support to over 100,000 people affected by medical accidents and succeeded in bringing about significant changes to the way that the legal system deals with clinical negligence and in moving patient safety higher up the agenda in the UK.

The legal reforms of Lord Woolf and the creation of agencies such as the National Patient Safety Agency (NPSA) and the Commission for Health Audit and Inspection (now the Care Quality Commission) followed years of AvMA raising these issues and campaigning. AvMA is also responsible for making clinical negligence a specialism within legal practice, and continues to accredit solicitors for its specialist panel and promote good practice through comprehensive services to claimant solicitors.

In 2000, AvMA's first chief executive, Arnold Simanowitz, was awarded the OBE in recognition of his achievements with AvMA.

In 2003 Peter Walsh was appointed as Chief Executive and the charity was relaunched under the new name Action Against Medical Accidents.

AvMA helped many families affected by the Stafford Hospital scandal, campaigned for the public inquiry, which eventually happened, and was a core participant in the inquiry. AvMA is extensively quoted in Sir Robert Francis QC's report, and most of AvMA's suggestions were taken up in his recommendations. Most notably, AvMA's arguments for a statutory duty of candor were supported by Sir Robert.

In 2023, the Chief Executive is Paul Whiteing.

== Campaigns ==
Duty of Candour: In January 2014, David Behan, chief executive of the Care Quality Commission, threw his weight behind a wide definition for the statutory duty of candour which was recommended by the Francis Report. The statutory duty of candour now applies to all health care organisations in England that are registered with the Care Quality Commission (CQC). Duty of Candour regulations were introduced in Scotland in 2018 and became law in Wales in April 2023.

Professional Standards: AvMA's specialist solicitor panel maintains quality standards in clinical negligence representation. Medical negligence specialists recommend that patients seek solicitors who are independently accredited and on AvMA's specialist panel, ensuring clients receive experienced representation from qualified practitioners.

Access to Justice: When something goes wrong and causes harm, it is vital that patients or their families are dealt with fairly and honestly and can get the support, answers and outcomes they are entitled to expect. AvMA campaigns to remove barriers to access injustice.

Research Projects: In 2023, AvMA is an advisory body on several projects with universities and the NHS.
