= Information disclosure statement =

An information disclosure statement (often abbreviated as IDS) refers to a submission of relevant background art or information to the United States Patent and Trademark Office (USPTO) by an applicant for a patent during the patent prosecution process. There is a duty on all patent applicants to disclose relevant art or background information that the applicant is aware of and that may be relevant to the patentability of the applicant's invention, as established by the United States Code title 35 and related sections of 37 CFR and the Manual of Patent Examining Procedure (MPEP). If a patent applicant, with deceptive intent for art known to the applicant, fails to submit material prior art to the USPTO, then any patent that later issues from the patent application may be declared unenforceable because of inequitable conduct. Furthermore, the duty to submit such relevant information to the USPTO lies not only on the applicant or inventor, but also on any patent attorney or other legal staff employed by the applicant.

Art listed on an IDS, on its own, is not automatically considered prior art. "Mere listing of a reference in an information disclosure statement is not taken as an admission that the reference is prior art against the claims."

== Contents ==
The information submitted in an IDS typically includes other issued patents, published patent applications, scientific journal articles, books, magazine articles, or any other published material that is relevant to the invention disclosed in the applicant's own patent application, irrespective of the country or language in which the published material was made.

Art listed on an IDS is typically broken up into three categories: U.S. patent literature, foreign patent literature, and non-patent literature (NPL). US patent literature consists of issued U.S. patents and U.S. patent application publications. Copies of listed U.S. patent literature do not need to be submitted along with the IDS as USPTO examiners have access to all U.S. patent literature. Foreign patent literature consists of patents issued in foreign countries, foreign application publications if they exist, and PCT international application publications. Non-patent literature consists of any publication that is not a U.S. or foreign patent publication, such as magazine articles or research journals. Copies of listed non-patent literature (NPL) and foreign patent publications need to be submitted along with the IDS or they will not be considered by USPTO examiners. If the copies of NPL or foreign patent publications are not in the English language, the applicant must also submit an English translation or a summary of relevancy in the English language in order for the piece of art to be considered by the examiner.

The content requirements of an IDS are defined in 37 CFR 1.98, which can be found in the MPEP.

== Submission requirements ==
The submission requirements of an IDS are defined in 37 CFR 1.97, also found in the MPEP, and include when and how the applicant is allowed to submit information disclosure statements. An IDS is not permitted in a provisional application. As of October 2006, relevant art may be submitted on paper using a USPTO-issued form, or electronically using the USPTO's electronic filing system.

== See also ==
- Duty of candor
- Patent Application Information Retrieval (PAIR)
