= Provisional application =

Type of patent application

A provisional application is a patent application filed at the intellectual property offices of some countries. It does not mature into an issued patent and is deemed abandoned one year after its filing. It is used to secure a filing date for a subsequent non-provisional patent application claiming priority of the provisional application. There is no such thing as a "provisional patent". The same term is used in past and current patent laws of different countries with different meanings.

== History ==
The provisional application was introduced to U.S. patent law with a 1994 amendment of the Patent Act of 1952. A 12-month benefit of priority to foreign-filed applications had been a part of U.S. patent law since the 1901 U.S. ratification of the Brussels revision of the Paris Convention for the Protection of Industrial Property.

== Characteristics ==
Under U.S. law, a provisional application, as such, is never examined by the United States Patent and Trademark Office (USPTO), and therefore never becomes a patent on its own (unless the provisional patent application is later converted into a non-provisional patent application by the applicant, and then the application is examined as a non-provisional application). The provisional application is also not "published", but becomes a part of any later non-provisional application file that references it, and thus becomes "public" upon issuance of a patent claiming its priority benefit.

A "provisional" is automatically abandoned (expires) one year after it is filed. The provisional filing date is not counted as part of the 20-year life of any patent that may issue with a claim to the provisional filing date.

The USPTO announced on December 8, 2010, that it was implementing a Missing Parts Pilot Program. This pilot program provided applicants with a 12-month extension to the existing 12-month provisional application period to file Missing Parts in a Non-provisional application. This pilot program did not change the requirement for an applicant to file a non-provisional application within 12 months; though it allowed additional time to reply to a missing parts notice. The USPTO decided not to extend the Extended Missing Parts Pilot Program beyond January 2, 2019.

A provisional application includes a specification, i.e., a description, and drawing(s) of an invention (drawings are required where necessary for the understanding of the subject matter sought to be patented), but does not require formal patent claims, inventors' oaths or declarations, or any information disclosure statement (IDS). Furthermore, because no examination of the patentability of the application in view of the prior art is performed, the USPTO fee for filing a provisional patent application is significantly lower ($65 - $325 as of January 19, 2025) than the fee required to file a standard non-provisional patent application.

== Procedure and benefits ==
To obtain the benefit of the "provisional" filing date, a non-provisional patent application must be filed, claiming benefit of the filing date of one or more specific provisional patent applications, prior to their expiration.

The provisional patent application is only pending for 12 months prior to becoming abandoned. Thus, filing a non-provisional patent application claiming the benefit of the provisional application must be done within 12 months. Otherwise, the rights to claim the benefit of provisional application are lost.

If a non-provisional application is not expected to be filed within one year, and the patent is not otherwise barred by law, another provisional application may also be filed at any time and start another one-year period (but this does not work in all cases).

Information disclosure statements (IDSs) are not permitted in provisional applications. Since no substantive examination is given in provisional applications, a disclosure of information is unnecessary. Any such statement filed in a provisional application will be returned or destroyed at the option of the Office.

The advantages of a provisional patent application are:

- ease of preparation,
- lower cost, and
- the ability to use the term "patent pending", which can only be legally used when a patent application has been filed, and which may have significant marketing advantages.

== See also ==
- Patent caveat
- Provisional rights
