= Injury (disambiguation) =

Injury is physical damage to the structure of a human, other animal, or plant.

Injury may also refer to:

- Injury (law)
- Injury (sports)
- Injury (journal), a peer-reviewed medical journal covering trauma care
- "The Injury", an episode of The Office
