= Consumer Duty =

Consumer Duty is a standard introduced by the Financial Conduct Authority, in the UK, intended to improve consumer protection for financial-services firms in the UK. The changes were announced in 2021 and officially came into force on 31 July 2023. The Consumer Duty has been described as the 'biggest overhaul for the UK's financial services industry in 20 years'.

== Requirements ==
The new rule establishes a "Consumer Principle"; firms must "act to deliver good outcomes for retail customers". Affected firms should review their products and their customer journeys. This also requires effective anti-fraud controls.

The UK's Treasury select committee said it would scrutinise how banks comply to the rules heavily. Financial Services companies were warned that if any evidence was found of risk of harm to the consumer, this could lead to interventions or investigations, and possible disciplinary sanctions.

There have been concerns that these requirements place an undue burden on smaller firms.

== Components of Customer Duty ==
- The "Consumer Principle", which becomes the 12th Principle of the FCA's "Principles for Businesses"
- The cross-cutting rules
- The four outcomes:
  - the governance of products and services
  - price and value
  - consumer understanding, and
  - consumer support

== Timeline ==
- The Consumer Duty standard evolved from Following FCA consultations in 2021;
- The final version of the guidance was published in July 2022;
- Implementation plans should have been agreed by the firms' leadership on 31 October 2022;
- Firms must implement the rule for their current business by July 2023;
- Consumer Duty is applied to "closed books" by July 2024;
- First annual board attestation by 31 July 2024.

== See also ==
- Consumer Financial Protection Bureau
- FCA Controlled Functions
- Financial Policy Committee
- Financial Services Authority
- Fraud Advisory Panel
- Prudential Regulation Authority
- Senior Managers Regime
- Consumer protection in the United Kingdom
