= FCA Controlled Functions =

Financial service code names

The Controlled Functions of the Financial Conduct Authority (FCA) are simplifying code names given to various functions within the financial services and relating to the carrying on of regulated activities by a firm. These are specified, under section 59 of the Financial Services and Markets Act which still stands as the reference after the FSA split into the FCA and the PRA. The FCA is solely responsible for all applications for approval for FCA Designated Controlled Functions for all FCA solo regulated firms.

== Controlled functions applicable for UK and overseas firms ==
=== Significant influence functions ===
==== CF 1 Director function ====
If a firm is a body corporate (other than a limited liability partnership), the Director Function is the function of acting in the capacity of a director (other than non-executive director) of that firm.

1. If a firm is a body corporate (other than a limited liability partnership), the director function is also the function of acting in the capacity of a person:
  - who is a director, partner, officer, member (if the parent undertaking or holding company is a limited liability partnership), senior manager, or employee of a parent undertaking or holding company of the firm; and
  - whose decisions or actions are regularly taken into account by the governing body of the firm.
2. (1) does not apply if that parent undertaking or holding company has a Part 4A permission or is regulated by an EEA regulator.
3. (1) does not apply to the function falling into SUP 10A.6.13 R (non-executive director of the parent undertaking or holding company).

==== CF 2 Non-executive director function ====
If a firm is a body corporate, the non-executive director function is the function of acting in the capacity of a non-executive director of that firm.

1. If a firm is a body corporate, the non-executive director function is also the function of acting in the capacity of a person:
  - who is a non-executive director of a parent undertaking or holding company; and
  - whose decisions or actions are regularly taken into account by the governing body of the firm.
2. However, (1) does not apply if that parent undertaking or holding company has a Part 4A permission or is regulated by an EEA regulator.

==== CF 3 Chief executive function ====
The chief executive function is the function of acting in the capacity of a chief executive of a firm.

This function is having the responsibility, alone or jointly with one or more others, under the immediate authority of the governing body:

1. for the conduct of the whole of the business (or relevant activities); or
2. in the case of a branch in the United Kingdom of an overseas firm, for the conduct of all of the activities subject to the UK regulatory system.

For a branch in the United Kingdom of an overseas firm, the FCA would not normally expect the overseas chief executive of the firm as a whole to be FCA-approved for this function where there is a senior manager under him with specific responsibility for those activities of the branch which are subject to the UK regulatory system. In some circumstances, the person within the firm responsible for UK operations may, if the function is likely to enable him to exercise significant influence over the branch, also perform the chief executive function (see SUP 10A.7.4 G).

A person performing the chief executive function may be a member of the governing body but need not be. If the chairman of the governing body is also the chief executive, he will be discharging this function. If the responsibility is divided between more than one person but not shared, there is no person exercising the chief executive function. But if that responsibility is discharged jointly by more than one person, each of those persons will be performing the chief executive function.

Note that a body corporate may be a chief executive. If so, it will need to be approved (if the firm in question is an FCA-authorised person) to perform the chief executive function.

The chief executive function does not apply in relation to a PRA-authorised person. PRA approval is required instead.

==== CF 4 Partner function ====
1. If a firm is a partnership, the partner function is the function of acting in the capacity of a partner in that firm.
2. If the principal purpose of the firm is to carry on one or more regulated activities, each partner performs the partner function.
3. If the principal purpose of the firm is other than to carry on regulated activities:
  - a partner performs the partner function to the extent only that he has responsibility for a regulated activity; and
  - a partner in a firm will be taken to have responsibility for each regulated activity except where the partnership has apportioned responsibility to another partner or group of partners.

Any apportionment referred to in SUP 10A.6.23R (3)(b) will have taken place under SYSC 2.1.1 R or SYSC 4.3.1 R and SYSC 4.4.3 R. The FCA may ask to see details of the apportionment but will not require, as a matter of course, a copy of the material which records this (see SYSC 2.2).

The effect of SUP 10A.1.17 R is that regulated activity in SUP 10A.6.23 R (and elsewhere) is to be taken as not including an activity that is a non-mainstream regulated activity. Therefore, a partner whose only regulated activities are incidental to his professional services, in a partnership whose principal purpose is to carry on other than regulated activities, need not be an FCA-approved person. What amounts to the principal purpose of the firm is a matter of fact in each case having regard to all the circumstances, including the activities of the firm as a whole. Any regulated activities which such a partner carries on are not within the description of the partner function.

If a firm is a limited liability partnership, the partner function extends to the firm as if the firm were a partnership and a member of the firm were a partner.

If a partnership is registered under the Limited Partnerships Act 1907, the partner function does not extend to any function performed by a limited partner.

The partner function does not apply in relation to a PRA-authorised person. PRA approval is required instead.

==== CF 5 Directors of an unincorporated association ====
If a firm is an unincorporated association, the director of unincorporated association function is the function of acting in the capacity of a director of the unincorporated association.

The director of unincorporated association function does not apply in relation to a PRA-authorised person. PRA approval is required instead.

==== CF 6 Small friendly society function ====
1. If a firm is a non-directive friendly society, the small friendly society function is the function of directing its affairs, either alone or jointly with others.
2. If the principal purpose of the firm is to carry on regulated activities, each person with responsibility for directing its affairs performs the FCA controlled function.
3. If the principal purpose of the firm is other than to carry on regulated activities, a person performs the small friendly society function only to the extent that he has responsibility for a regulated activity.
1. Each person on the non-directive friendly society's governing body will be taken to have responsibility for its regulated activities, unless the firm has apportioned this responsibility to one particular individual to whom it is reasonable to give this responsibility.
2. The individual need not be a member of the governing body.

Typically a non-directive friendly society will appoint a "committee of management" to direct its affairs. However, the governing arrangements may be informal and flexible. If this is the case, the FCA would expect the society to resolve to give responsibility for the carrying on of regulated activities to one individual who is appropriate in all the circumstances. That individual may, for example, have the title of chief executive or similar. The individual would have to be an FCA-approved person under SUP 10A.6.31 R.

In practice, the FCA expects that most non-directive friendly societies will be PRA-authorised persons. Where that is the case, the small friendly society function will not apply. PRA approval is required instead.

==== CF10 Compliance oversight function ====
The CF10 control function is the simplifying code name given by the Financial Conduct Authority to the compliance oversight function within the financial services industry in the United Kingdom. The compliance oversight function is the function of acting in the capacity of a director or senior manager who is allocated by the Financial Services Authority the function of reporting to the governing body to ensure compliance with the rules set out in Conduct of Business, Collective Investment Schemes and Client Assets related operations.

Often, the CF10 function is held by the chief compliance officer, whose role is to ensure that an organization is compliant with both internal and external policies and regulations. The chief compliance officer oversees the development and implementation of procedures that facilitate compliance and works with other executives to ensure compliance throughout all departments within an organization and responsible for ensuring that the organization has the necessary resources to research and track external laws, regulations, and industry standards.

The 2008 financial crisis had a serious impact on the compliance field, highlighting the need for radical reforms to ensure the solvency and transparency of firms in times of economic fluctuations as the implementation of globally agreed principles and standards remains highly challenging, given there are no legal powers to enforce or settle disputes between jurisdictions at the global level. The 2008 financial crisis in that respect created an opportunity for financial professionals to provide much needed context and clarity to investors.

==== Other significant influence functions ====
- CF 8 Apportionment and oversight function (non-MiFID business only)
- CF10a CASS operational oversight function
- CF 11 Money laundering reporting function
- CF 12 Actuarial function
- CF 12A With-profits actuary function
- CF 12B Lloyd's Actuary function
- CF 28 System and controls function
- CF 29 Significant management function

=== Customer functions ===
==== CF 30 Customer function ====
The customer function is the function of:

1. advising on investments other than a non-investment insurance contract (but not where this is advising on investments in the course of carrying on the activity of giving basic advice on a stakeholder product) and performing other functions related to this such as dealing and arranging;
2. giving advice to clients solely in connection with corporate finance business and performing other functions related to this;
3. giving advice or performing related activities in connection with pension transfers or opt-outs for retail clients;
4. giving advice to a person to become, or continue or cease to be, a member of a particular Lloyd's syndicate;
5. dealing, as principal or as agent, and arranging (bringing about) deals in investments other than a non-investment insurance contract with, for, or in connection with customers where the dealing or arranging deals is governed by COBS 11 (Dealing and managing);
6. acting in the capacity of an investment manager and carrying on functions connected to this;
7. in relation to bidding in emissions auctions, acting as a 'bidder's representative' within the meaning of subparagraph 3 of article 6(3) of the auction regulation.

== Controlled functions applicable for incoming EEA firms ==
=== EEA Significant influence functions ===
- CF 11 Money laundering reporting function
- CF 12 Actuarial function
- CF 12A With-profits actuary function
- CF 12B Lloyd's Actuary function
- CF 29 Significant management function

=== EEA Customer functions ===
==== EEA CF 30 Customer function ====
The CF 30 Customer Function for incoming EEA firm are the equivalent of the CF 30 function outlined above.

== See also ==
- Senior Managers Regime
- Consumer Duty
