= Pudsey =

Town in West Yorkshire, England

Coordinates: 53.797°N 1.663°W

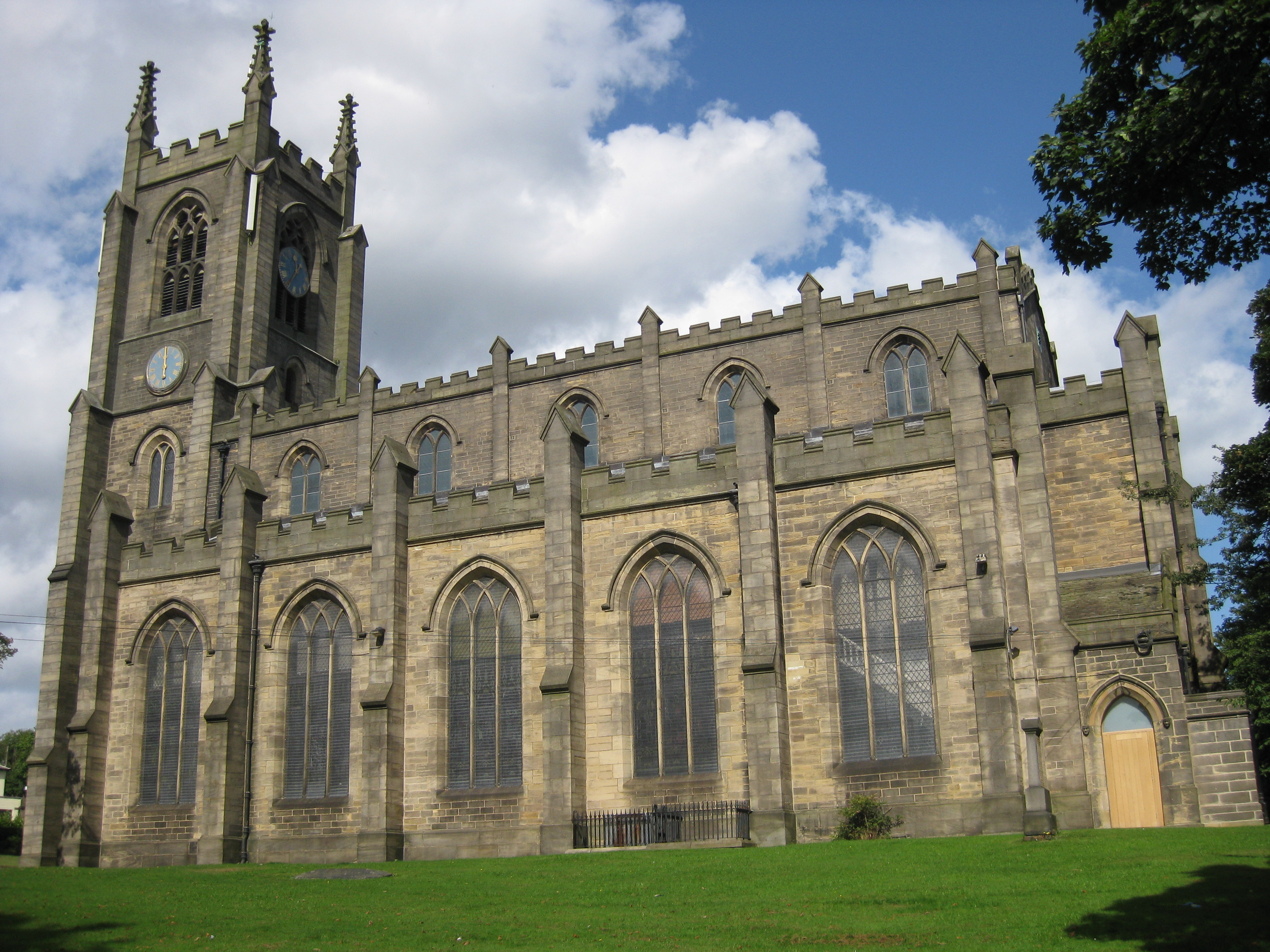
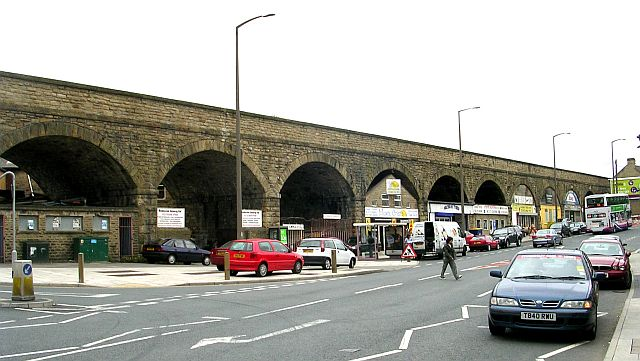
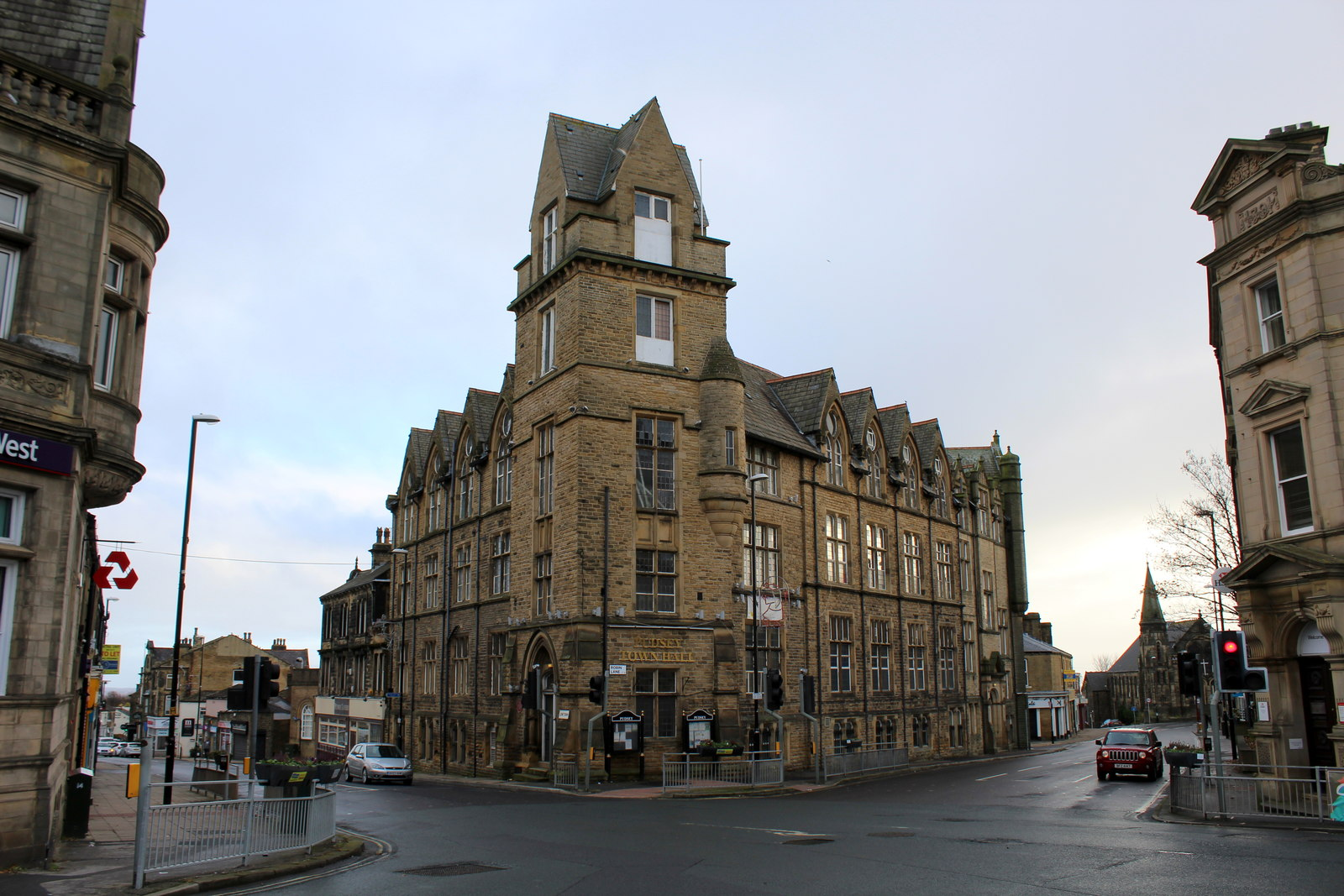
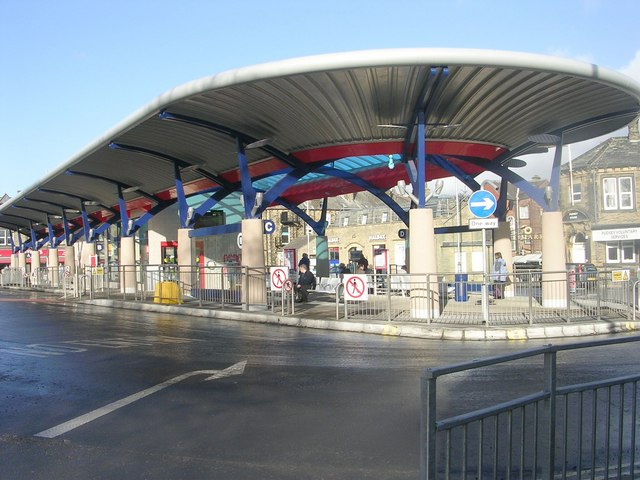
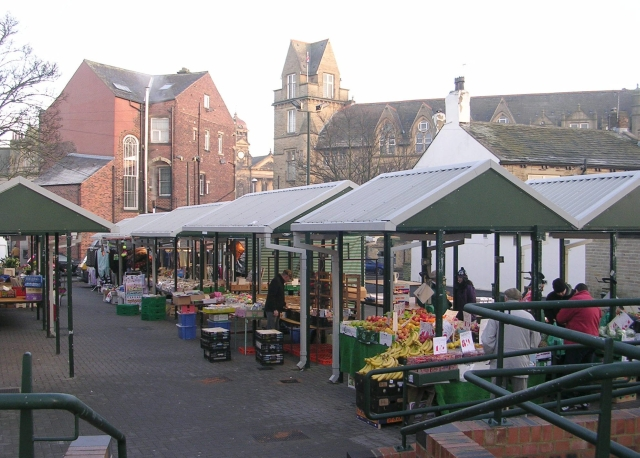
- Parish Church Stanningley Viaduct Pudsey Town Hall Bus Station The Marketplace

- Location within West Yorkshire
- Population: 25,393 (2021 census)
- OS grid reference: SE 223 334
  - London: 170 mi (270 km) SE
- Metropolitan borough: City of Leeds
- Metropolitan county: West Yorkshire
- Region: Yorkshire and the Humber
- Country: England
- Sovereign state: United Kingdom
- Post town: PUDSEY
- Postcode district: LS28
- Dialling code: 0113
- Police: West Yorkshire
- Fire: West Yorkshire
- Ambulance: Yorkshire
- UK Parliament: Leeds West and Pudsey

Pudsey is a market town in the City of Leeds in West Yorkshire, England. It is located midway between Bradford city centre and Leeds city centre. Historically in the West Riding of Yorkshire, it has a population of 25,393.

== History ==
The place-name Pudsey is first recorded in 1086 in the Domesday Book as Podechesai(e). Its etymology is uncertain: it seems most likely to derive from a putative personal name *Pudoc and the word ēg meaning 'island', but here presumably referring metaphorically to an 'island' of good ground in moorland. Thus the name would mean 'Pudoc's island'. However, other possibilities have been suggested. In the early sixth century the district was in the Kingdom of Elmet, which seems to have retained its Celtic character for perhaps as many as two centuries after other neighbouring kingdoms had adopted the cultural identity of the Angles.

Around 1775, a cache of a hundred silver Roman coins, many predating the time of Julius Caesar, was found by Benjamin Scholfield of Pudsey on Pudsey Common, to the north of the town, at a place traditionally known as "King Alfred's Camp".

Pudsey gained note in the 18th and 19th centuries for wool manufacture, and, from the 19th century, for cricket. Yorkshire and England cricketers Herbert Sutcliffe, Sir Len Hutton, Ray Illingworth and Matthew Hoggard all learned to play in Pudsey. A 19th-century Yorkshire cricketer, John Tunnicliffe, was born in Lowtown.

Lying between Leeds and Bradford, and standing on slightly lower ground than either city, Pudsey had smoke blown onto it by most winds, and was one of the most polluted towns in the UK during the Industrial Revolution, becoming notorious for its thick soot.

== Governance ==
Formerly within the wapentake of Morley and Calverley Parish, Pudsey Urban District was formed in 1894; it gained municipal borough status c. 1901. For many years, despite being joined to the Leeds conurbation, it avoided being made part of the County Borough of Leeds. In 1937 the Farsley and Calverley urban districts were added to Pudsey. In 1974, under the Local Government Act 1972, it became part of the metropolitan borough of the City of Leeds. It sits in the Leeds City Council ward of Pudsey.

Pudsey was part of the old Pudsey parliamentary constituency, along with Farsley, Calverley, Horsforth and Guiseley. The last Member of Parliament (MP) for the constituency was Stuart Andrew.

Pudsey's current constituency (as of 2024) is now Leeds West and Pudsey and the MP is Rachel Reeves.

== Present ==
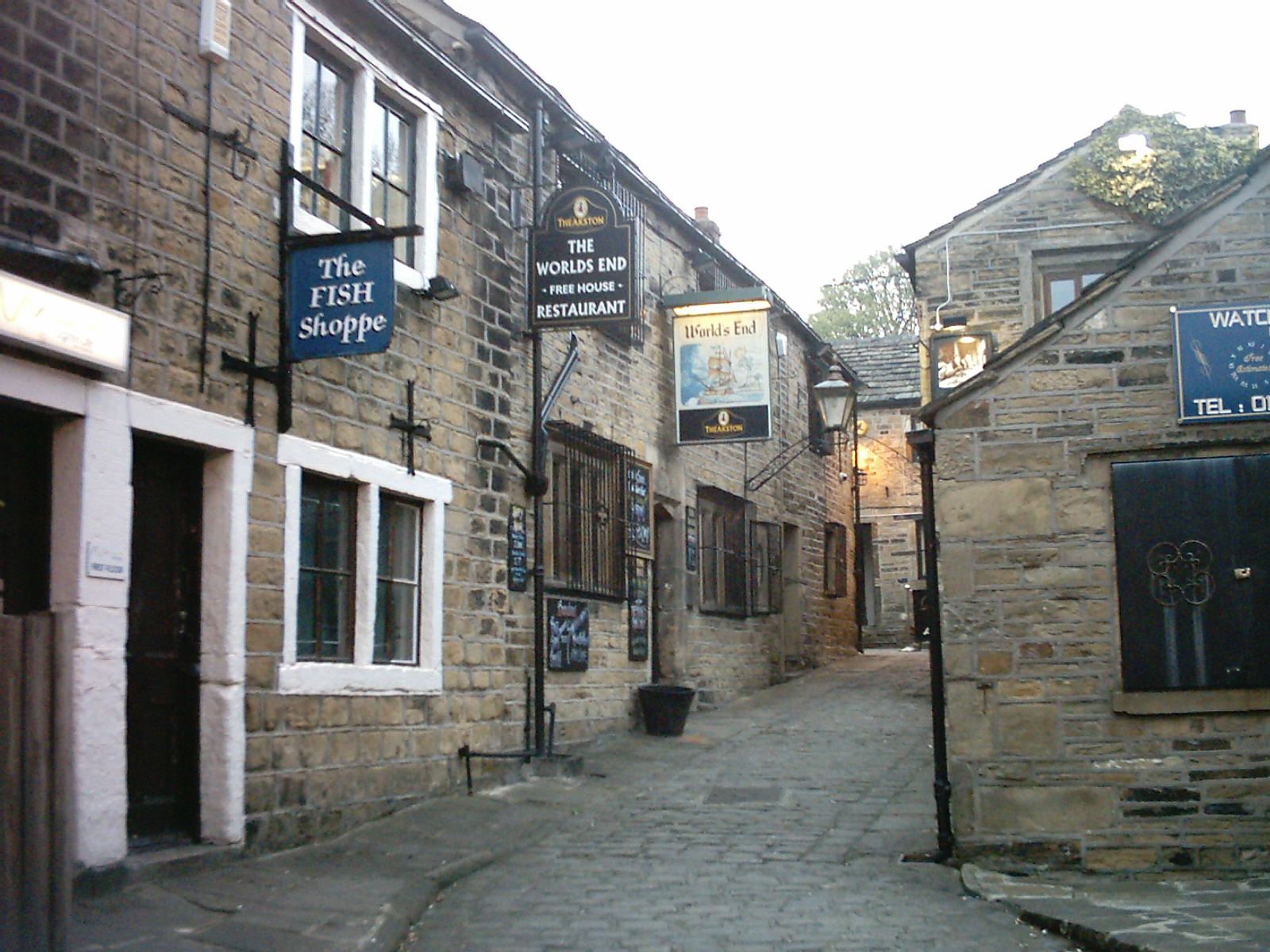
The World's End public house

There are recreational parks in Pudsey, the largest of which is Pudsey Park. Queens Park is where the Pudsey carnival is held once a year.

Pudsey's market operates on Tuesday, Friday and Saturday and has recently been refurbished. Pudsey has a monthly farmers' market with stalls selling meat, fish, dairy produce, organic fruit and vegetables, delicatessen and craft-ware.

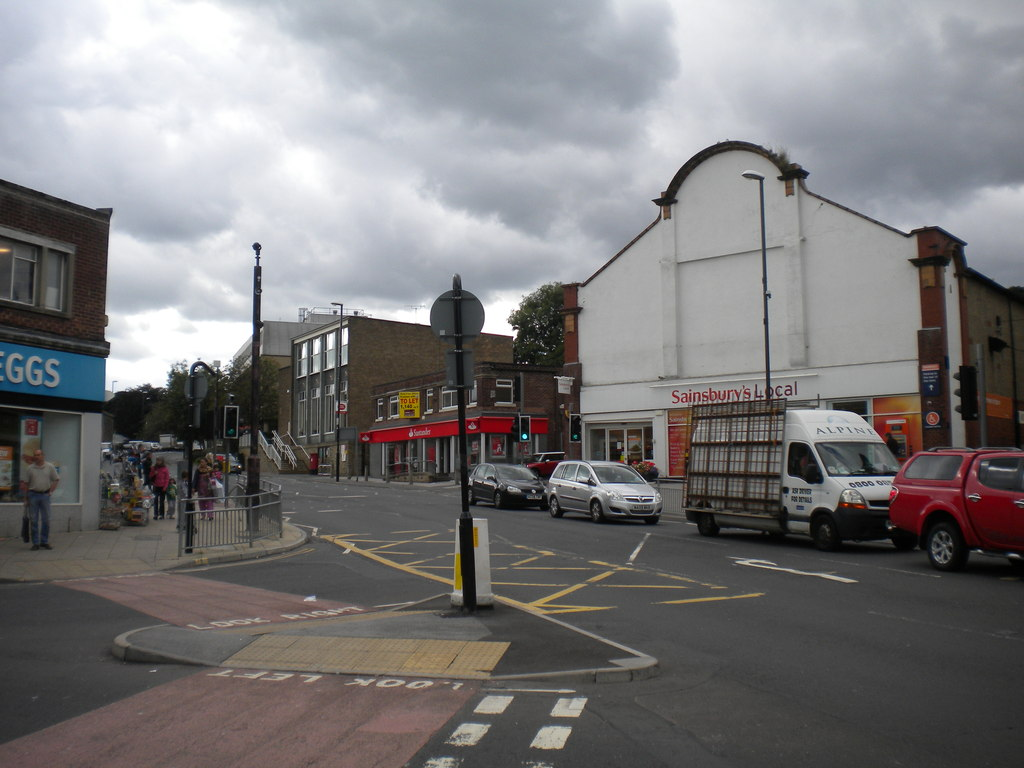
Pudsey town centre

Pudsey town centre has amenities including high street chain stores and independent retailers, Pudsey had three main banks, Barclays, NatWest and HSBC (formerly Midland Bank). The only remaining bank is Virgin Money (formerly Yorkshire Bank). The town also has a number of estate agents. Following the closure of Kwik Save supermarkets across the country, Pudsey's store was bought by Sainsbury's. This building was a former cinema until closure in 1960.The final film screened was Doctor in Love. Until the administration of the group, Pudsey had a Woolworths on Church Lane. It is now a B&M Home Bargains store.

There are three secondary schools situated within Pudsey: Crawshaw Academy, Co-op Academy Priesthorpe and Pudsey Grammar School. The latter has been rebuilt under an extensive redevelopment programme adjacent to the current site. The old grammar school building facing Richardshaw Lane, which opened in 1911 and is a prominent Pudsey landmark, will (unlike the rest of the old school buildings) not be demolished due to its listed building status, but has since been converted into flats. The new Pudsey Sixth Form College has since opened in September 2025.

During the Easter weekend 2009, the Pudsey Business Forum launched the Pudsey Shop Local campaign. The campaign is to encourage local residents to shop more in Pudsey Town Centre. As part of this campaign they have launched a directory of all local shops. Pudsey in Bloom was established in 2002.

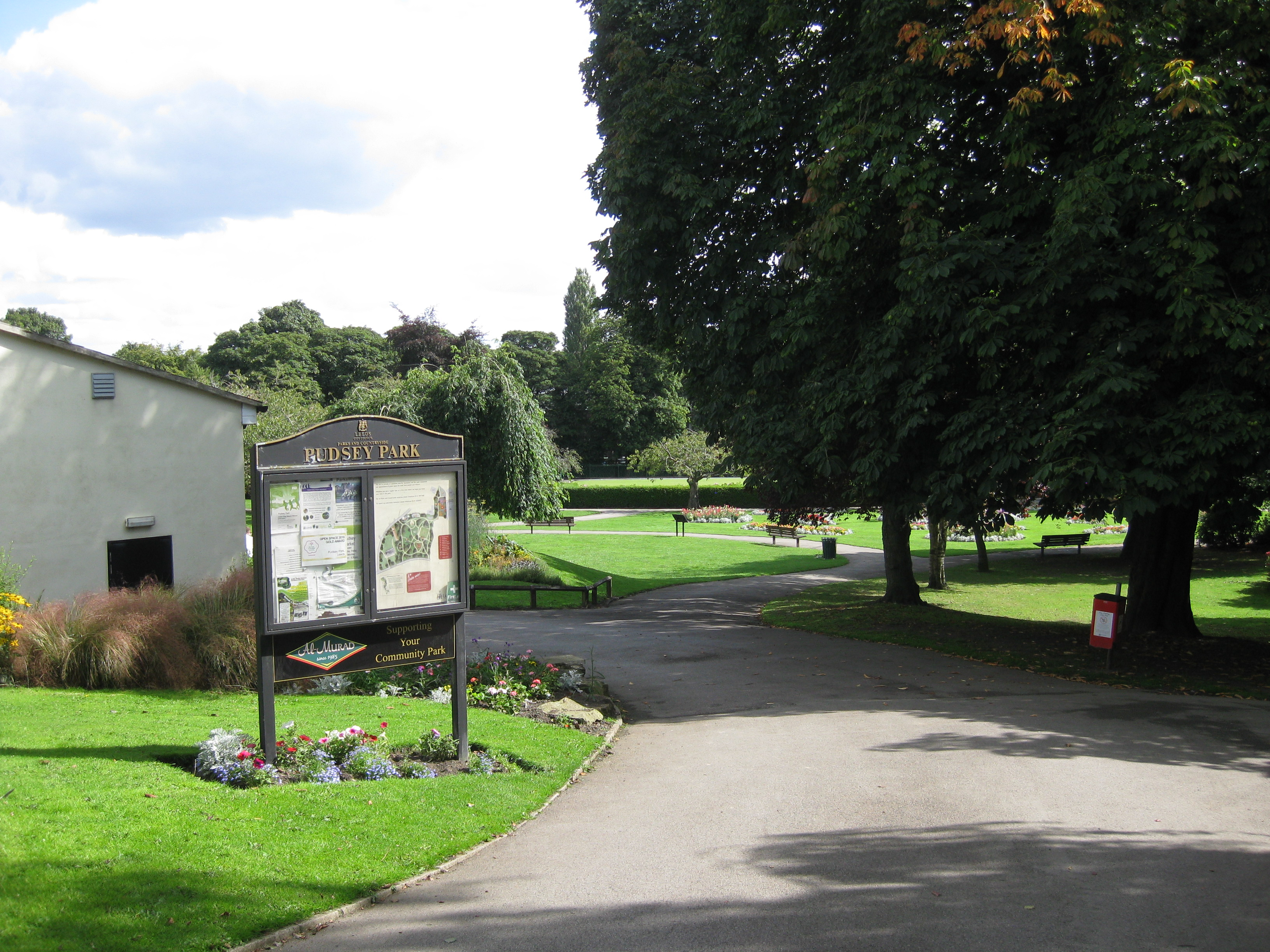
Pudsey Park – opened in October 1889

In 2020, Pudsey's business community introduced a Lottery Scheme aimed at local shoppers. The lottery scheme encourages shoppers to purchase tickets from local shops within the scheme. At the end of each month a draw takes place and prizes are paid out in Pudsey Pounds that can be spent in participating shops.

== Public transport ==
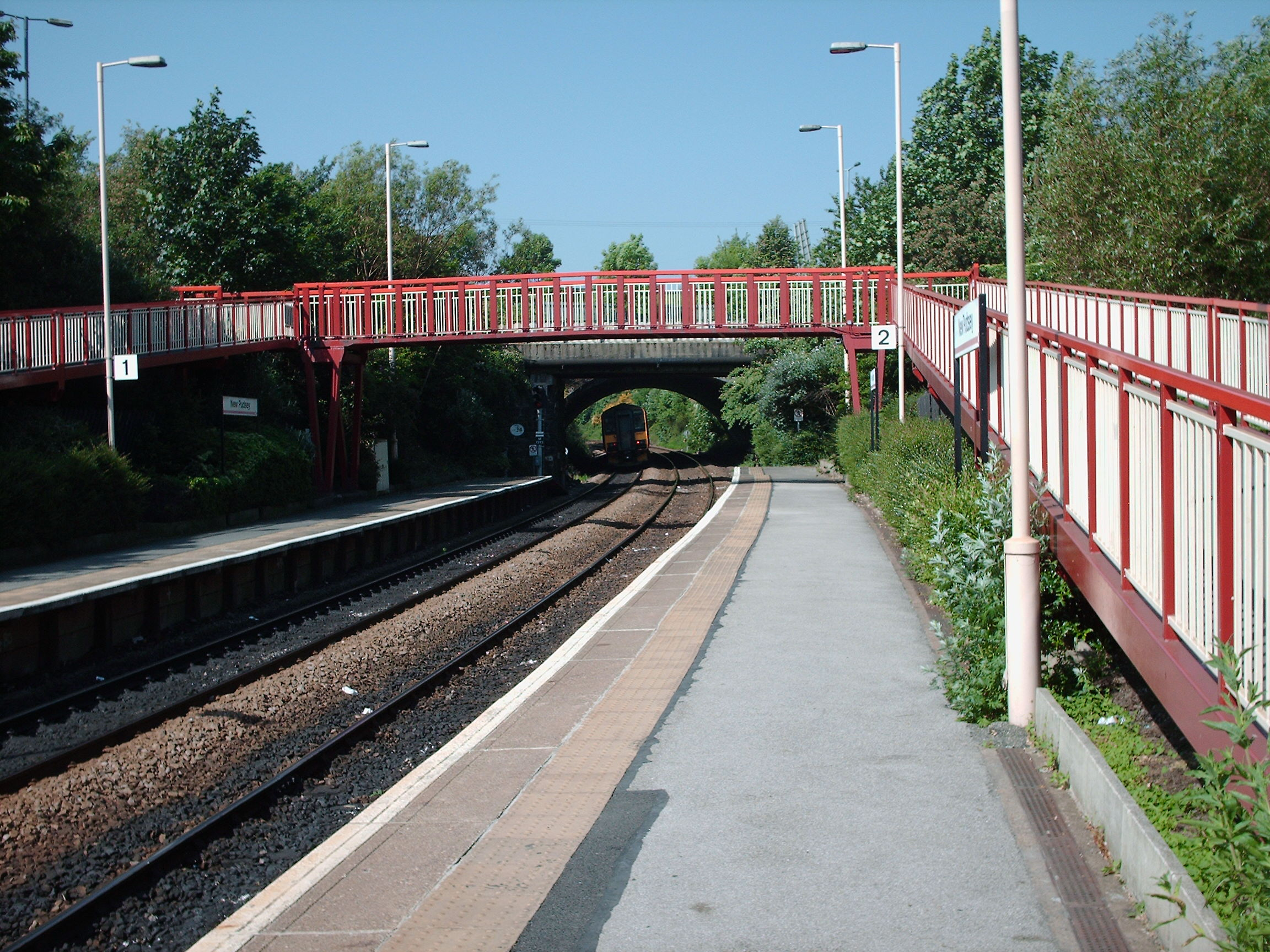
New Pudsey railway station

New Pudsey railway station is on the Caldervale Line between Leeds and Bradford Interchange. It was built as a "parkway" station, and is situated over one mile (1.5 kilometres) away from the town centre. The frequent no. 16 bus service between Pudsey and Farsley (continuing to Leeds) passes close to the station. The location of the station near to the junction of the main Leeds to Bradford road with the ring road provides easy access for those travelling to the station by car. There is a large car park adjacent to the station.

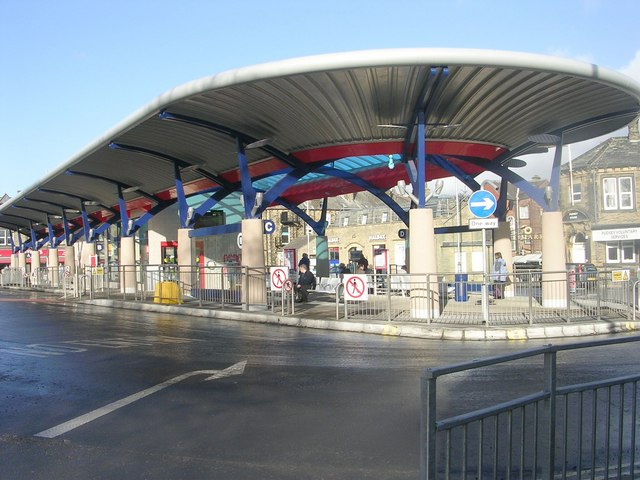
Pudsey bus station

Pudsey bus station serves the town. The bus station is managed and operated by West Yorkshire Metro. It is situated at Market Place and consists of six stands in total. Services are operated by TLC Travel, First Leeds. The original bus station was replaced by a new structure that opened on 14 November 2010. Metro and Leeds City Council re-built it in the style of similar bus stations in West Yorkshire. Buses go from Pudsey to various parts of neighbouring Leeds, such as Armley, Bramley, Chapel Allerton, Cross Gates, Farsley, Horsforth, Headingley, Seacroft (a number of services run from the here to Seacroft bus station) and White Rose Centre, and as far afield as Dewsbury and Bradford.

== Sport ==
The England cricket captain Len Hutton was born in nearby Fulneck and was called "the man from Pudsey". Raymond Illingworth, another former England cricket captain, was born in Pudsey as was the England fast bowler Matthew Hoggard and the snooker player Danny Fowler. For over a hundred years the Yorkshire County Cricket Club had at least one player who came from the old Borough of Pudsey. The England opening batsman Herbert Sutcliffe attended Pudsey School and learnt his cricket with the Pudsey St Lawrence and Pudsey Britannia cricket clubs.

=== Cricket clubs ===
Pudsey Congs Cricket Club is an English amateur cricket club with a history of cricket in the village dating back to the 1892. The club has been based on the former Pudsey Britannia Cricket Club ground since they purchased it in 1977. Pudsey Congs field three senior teams. Their 1st and 2nd teams are in the Bradford Premier League and their 3rd team in the Dales Council Cricket League. Their junior training section play competitive cricket in the Bradford Junior Cricket League.

Pudsey St Lawrence Cricket Club was founded in 1845 and is based on Tofts Road. The club has a significant success record, with 10 Bradford Premier League championship titles to their name. Pudsey St Lawrence field two senior teams in the Bradford Premier League and a 3rd team in the Dales Council Cricket League. Their junior training section play competitive cricket in the Airedale & Wharfedale Junior Cricket League, a junior girls league with the West Yorkshire Women & Girls Cricket League, and a late summer junior league in the Leeds Cricket League.

== Cultural references ==
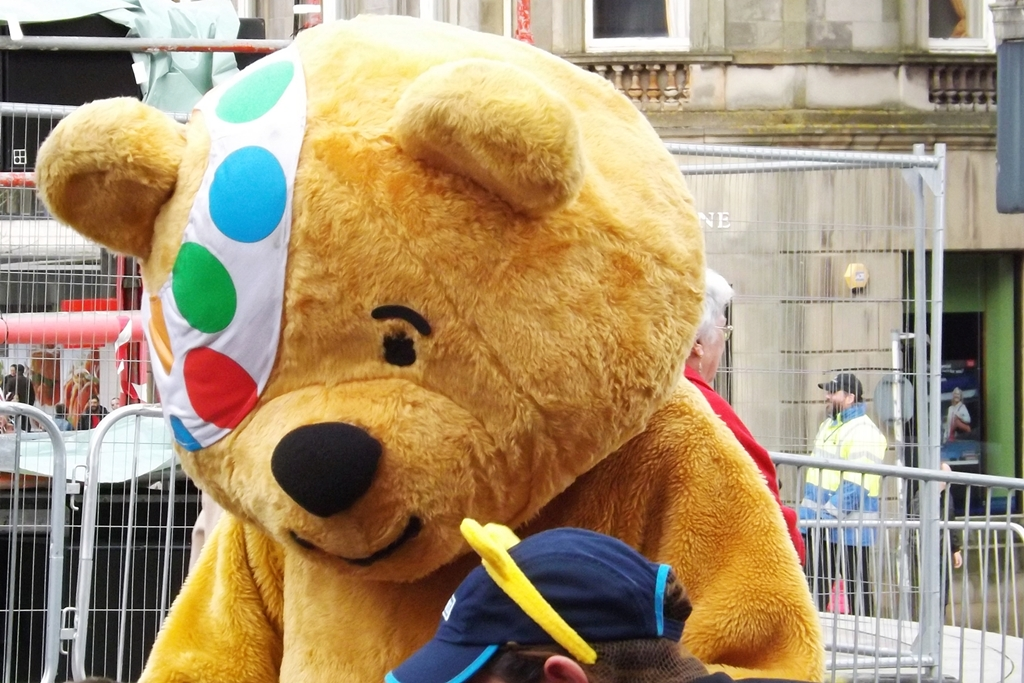
Pudsey Bear

In The Meaning of Liff a "Pudsey" is defined as "The curious-shaped flat wads of dough left on a kitchen table after someone has been cutting scones out of it." Toward the beginning of the Monty Python episode "You're No Fun Anymore", the two characters, Mr and Mrs Samuel Brainsample can be seen walking along the platform of New Pudsey railway station. Pudsey is also mentioned frequently in the Michael Palin TV series Ripping Yarns.

Pudsey has given its name to "Pudsey Bear", the mascot of the BBC's annual fundraising marathon Children in Need, as this was where Pudsey logo designer Joanna Lane's grandfather was mayor.

In bellringing Pudsey is one of the "Standard Eight" Surprise Major methods, the most commonly rung complex pieces of ringing for eight bells.

== See also ==
- Listed buildings in Pudsey
