= Merton thesis =

Argument in experimental science

The Merton thesis is an argument about the nature of early experimental science proposed by Robert K. Merton. Similar to Max Weber's famous claim on the link between Protestant work ethic and the capitalist economy, Merton argued for a similar positive correlation between the rise of Protestant Pietism and early experimental science. The Merton thesis has resulted in continuous debates.

Although scholars are still debating it, Merton's 1936 doctoral dissertation (and two years later his first monograph by the same title) Science, Technology and Society in 17th-Century England raised important issues on the connections between religion and the rise of modern science, became a significant work in the realm of the sociology of science and continues to be cited in new scholarship. Merton further developed this thesis in other publications.

== Thesis ==
The Merton thesis has two separate parts: firstly, it presents a theory that science changes due to an accumulation of observations and improvement in experimental technique and methodology; secondly, it puts forward the argument that the popularity of science in England in the 17th century, and the religious demography of the Royal Society (English scientists of that time were predominantly Puritans or other Protestants) can be explained by a correlation between Protestantism and the scientific values (see Mertonian norms).

Merton focuses on English Puritanism and German Pietism as being responsible for the development of the Scientific Revolution of the 17th and 18th centuries. He explains that the connection between religious affiliation and interest in science is a result of a significant synergy between the ascetic Protestant values and those of modern science. Protestant values encouraged scientific research by allowing science to identify God's influence on the world and thus providing religious justification for scientific research.

== Criticism ==
The first part of Merton's thesis has been criticized for insufficient consideration of the roles of mathematics and the mechanical philosophy in the scientific revolution. The second part has been criticized for the difficulty involved in defining who counts as a Protestant of the "right type" without making arbitrary distinctions. It is also criticized for failing to explain why non-Protestants do science (consider the Catholics Copernicus, da Vinci, Descartes, or Galileo) and conversely why Protestants of the "right type" are not all interested in science.

Merton, acknowledging the criticism, replied that the Puritan ethos was not necessary, although it did facilitate development of science. He also noted that when science had acquired institutional legitimacy, it no longer needed religion, eventually becoming a counterforce, leading to religious decline. Nonetheless, early on, in Merton's view religion was a major factor that allowed the scientific revolution to occur. While the Merton thesis does not explain all the causes of the scientific revolution, it does illuminate possible reasons why England was one of its driving motors and the structure of the English scientific community.

== Support ==
In 1958, American sociologist Gerhard Lenski published a book summarizing an empirical study of the influence of religious affiliation among residents of the Detroit, Michigan area. Among other insights, he interpenetrated his study to reveal that there were significant differences between Catholics on the one hand, and (white) Protestants and Jews on the other hand, with regard to economics and the sciences.

Lenski's data supported the basic hypotheses of Max Weber's work The Protestant Ethic and the Spirit of Capitalism. According to Lenski, the "contributions of Protestantism to material progress have been largely unintended by-products of certain distinctive Protestant traits. This was a central point in Weber's theory." Lenski noted that more than a hundred years prior to Weber, John Wesley, one of the founders of the Methodist church, had observed that "diligence and frugality" made Methodists wealthy. "In an early era, Protestant asceticism and dedication to work, as noted both by Wesley and Weber, seem to have been important patterns of action contributing to economic progress." However, Lenski said, asceticism was rare among modern Protestants, and the distinctive Protestant doctrine of "the calling" was largely forgotten. Instead, modern (white) Protestants and Jews had a high degree of "intellectual autonomy" that facilitated scientific and technical advance. By contrast, Lenski pointed out, Catholics developed an intellectual orientation which valued "obedience" to the teachings of their church above intellectual autonomy, which made them less inclined to enter scientific careers. Catholic sociologists had come to the same conclusions.

Lenski traced these differences back to the Reformation and the Catholic church's reaction to it. In Lenski's view, the Reformation encouraged intellectual autonomy among Protestants, in particular the Anabaptists, Puritans, Pietists, Methodists, and Presbyterians. In the Middle Ages, there had been tendencies toward intellectual autonomy, as exemplified in men like Erasmus. But after the Reformation, the Catholic leaders increasingly identified these tendencies with Protestantism and heresy and demanded that Catholics be obedient and faithful to ecclesiastical discipline. In Lenski's opinion, his study showed that these differences between Protestants and Catholics survived to the present day. As a consequence

"none of the predominantly and devoutly Catholic nations in the modern world can be classified as a leading industrial nation. Some Catholic nations – such as France, Italy, Argentina, Brazil, and Chile – are quite highly industrialized, but none of them are leaders in the technological and scientific fields, nor do they seem likely to become so. Recently [1963] some Brazilian Catholic social scientists compared their country's progress with that of the United States and concluded that the chief factor responsible for the differential rates of development is the religious heritage of the two nations."

Puritans and Pietists both contributed to intellectual autonomy and provided intellectual tools and values important for science. As an example, pietism challenged the orthodoxy via new media and formats: Periodical journals gained importance versus the former pasquills and single thesis, traditional disputation was replaced by competitive debating, which tried to gain new knowledge instead of defending orthodox scholarship. It is a part of the forces that lead to modernity.

== Sources ==
- Becker, George (December 1992). "The Merton thesis: Oetinger and German Pietism, a significant negative case". Sociological Forum. 7 (4): 642–660. doi:10.1007/bf01112319. S2CID 56239703.
- Cohen, I., ed. (1990). Puritanism and the rise of modern science: The Merton thesis. New Brunswick, NJ: Rutgers University Press. ISBN 978-0813515304.
- Cohen, H. (1994). The Scientific Revolution: A historiographical inquiry. Chicago, IL: University of Chicago Press. pp. 320–321. ISBN 9780226112800 – via Archive.org. Floris Cohen, H. (3 October 1994). Google Books, pp. 320–321. University of Chicago Press. ISBN 9780226112800.
- Ferngren, Gary B. (2002). Science and Religion: A historical introduction. Baltimore, MD: Johns Hopkins University Press. p. 125. ISBN 9780801870385. Ferngren, Gary B. (August 2002). Google Books, p. 125. JHU Press. ISBN 9780801870385.
- Gregory, Andrew (1998). "Lecture 14" (course handout). 215 – The Scientific Revolution. Archived from the original on 2006-05-13.
- Heddendorf, Russel (December 1986). "Religion, science, and the problem of modernity". Perspectives on Science & Christian Faith. 38 (4): 226–231.
- Lenski, G. (1963). The Religious Factor: A sociological study of religion's impact on politics, economics, and family life (Revised ed.). New York, NY.
- Porter, Roy; Teich, Mikuláš (1992). The Scientific revolution in national context. Cambridge, UK / New York, NY: Cambridge University Press. p. 179. ISBN 9780521396998. Porter, Roy; Teich, Mikulas (25 September 1992). Google Books, p. 179. Cambridge University Press. ISBN 9780521396998.
- Sztompka, P. (2003). "Robert K. Merton". In Ritzer, G. (ed.). The Blackwell Companion to Major Contemporary Social Theorists. Malden, MA / Oxford, UK: Blackwell. p. 13. ISBN 9781405105958.

Also available as:

Sztompka, P. (2003). "Chapter 1. Robert K. Merton". [Extract from] the Blackwell ... Social Theorists. Wiley. pp. 12–33. doi:10.1002/9780470999912.ch2. ISBN 9780470999912 – via blackwellreference.com.
