= Erich Spangenberg =

- Born: United States
- Occupations: Intellectual-property entrepreneur, lawyer
- Known for: Patent monetization; founder of IPNav, IPwe and SIM IP

Erich Spangenberg is an American former attorney and entrepreneur who has been called “the world's most notorious patent troll” over his involvement in the acquisition, enforcement, and financing of intellectual property. He currently resides between Paris, France and Miami, Florida. He founded IP Navigation Group (IPNav), one of the most active patent assertion entities of the 2000s and early 2010s, which The New York Times reported had filed suit against 1,638 companies in the five years to mid-2013. Spangenberg has been described in media including The New York Times, Bloomberg Law and the Electronic Frontier Foundation, as one of the most notorious figures associated with the patent-assertion industry.

== Early life and education ==
Spangenberg was licensed as an attorney in Texas on 8 November 1985, however, he was suspended at an unknown date by the State Bar of Texas for an “administrative reason” and is therefore ineligible to practice law in Texas. Spangenberg was also admitted to the Illinois State Bar on 19 June 1990. His licence is voluntarily inactive, and he is no longer authorised to practice law in the state. Spangenberg was last registered as an attorney in Illinois in 1996.

== IPNav and patent litigation ==
Spangenberg was the owner and founder of IP Navigation Group, LLC (IPNav), a patent monetization firm active between the 2000s and mid-2010s. Spangenberg was IPNav’s CEO until 2014. IPNav had sued at least 1,600 companies for patent infringement, including Verizon, AT&T, Amazon, and Google.

In 2017, Spangenberg and IPNav were sued for fraud by a technology company for using affiliated entities to acquire patents while avoiding agreed payment obligations. The litigation was resolved by settlement and voluntarily dismissed in 2018.

In Taurus IP, LLC v. DaimlerChrysler Corp., Chrysler and Mercedes-Benz USA accused Spangenberg of fraudulent asset transfers involving his patent-holding entities. In an October 2007 ruling, District Judge Barbara B. Crabb found a prima facie case that Spangenberg had used affiliated non-practising entities, Taurus IP, Orion IP, Constellation IP and Plutus IP, to "perpetuate a fraud" against the defendants. The court later found the suit was pursued "in bad faith" and "vexatiously", and sanctioned Spangenberg for his role in an attorney's attempt to intimidate a witness before trial, a finding the Federal Circuit affirmed in 2013.

The New York Times profile reported details of Spangenberg's personal wealth and lifestyle, describing a self-reported annual income of around $25 million, a large Dallas home, a collection of Lamborghini cars, and a wine purchase at a Christie's auction. Independent reporting by The Register in April 2013 described a breach-of-contract suit brought by Rackspace against IPNav.

In May 2014, Intellectual Asset Management reported that Spangenberg would step down as chief executive of IPNav by the end of that year, with President Deirdre Leane succeeding him. In June 2015, Techdirt and other outlets reported that Spangenberg was scaling back his involvement in patent-assertion litigation, citing the impact of the United States Supreme Court's decision in Alice Corp. v. CLS Bank International and rulings facilitating fee-shifting against unsuccessful patent plaintiffs.

== Coalition for Affordable Drugs ==
In 2015, Spangenberg co-organized the Coalition for Affordable Drugs (CFAD) with hedge-fund manager Kyle Bass of Hayman Capital Management. Spangenberg and Bass claimed that the coalition’s goal was to bring down drug prices kept artificially high through dubious patents. To achieve this, the coalition used the inter partes review (IPR) procedure created by the America Invents Act to challenge the validity of pharmaceutical patents, while affiliated funds took short positions in the patent holders' stock. Institutional Investor described the strategy as jointly developed by Bass and Spangenberg and identified Spangenberg as the patent specialist behind its legal mechanics.

A 2018 note in the Fordham Journal of Corporate and Financial Law reported that CFAD filed 33 inter partes review petitions against patents held by 28 pharmaceutical companies. Trade-press coverage by Managing Intellectual Property and Law360 documented petitions against, among others, Acorda Therapeutics, Biogen, Pharmacyclics, Jazz Pharmaceuticals, Shire and Celgene. On 27 October 2016, the Patent Trial and Appeal Board issued final written decisions invalidating claims of two Celgene patents covering the multiple-myeloma drugs Pomalyst and Revlimid in response to CFAD petitions. The PTAB rejected sanctions motions arguing that CFAD's profit motive made its petitions an abuse of process. Other CFAD petitions, including challenges to Biogen's Tecfidera and Acorda's Ampyra patents, were denied institution or unsuccessful at final written decision. Bloomberg Law has retrospectively characterized the overall campaign as a failed attempt to lower drug prices through patent challenges. The coalition wound down in 2018.

== IPwe ==
In 2017, Spangenberg founded IPwe, a company that sought to build a global patent-transaction platform using blockchain technology and, in partnership with IBM, to issue patents as non-fungible tokens. According to Law360, IPwe filed for Chapter 11 bankruptcy protection under Subchapter V in the United States Bankruptcy Court for the District of Delaware on 24 January 2024 with approximately $7.2 million in scheduled debt, a significant portion of which was owed to IBM. In March 2024, Intellectual Asset Management reported that the case had converted to a Chapter 7 liquidation following the failure of debtor-in-possession financing that had been expected from Granicus IP, an entity that Intellectual Asset Management reported was led by Spangenberg.

== SIM IP and SIM Acquisition Corp. I ==
Spangenberg founded Sauvegarder Investment Management, based in Miami, Florida, and the patent-monetization firm SIM IP. In March 2025, Bloomberg Law reported that a Form S-1 filed with the U.S. Securities and Exchange Commission in connection with a planned Nasdaq listing of SIM IP identified Donald Trump Jr. as one of the company's shareholders as well as Eleven Ventures, a venture capital firm managed by Hartley Wasko, which frequently invests in Trump family ventures. In February 2026, Bloomberg Law reported that SIM IP had agreed to acquire the artificial-intelligence research platform Garden Intel in a transaction valued at approximately $150 million.

Spangenberg was the founding chairman and chief executive of SIM Acquisition Corp. I, a special-purpose acquisition company sponsored by Sauvegarder Investment Management with a healthcare investment mandate, which completed an upsized $230 million initial public offering on the Nasdaq in July 2024 under the ticker SIMA. He has also served on the board of Spectral AI, a Dallas-based medical-imaging company; in April 2024 Spectral AI announced that he had been appointed chief executive of its Spectral IP subsidiary, which was subsequently spun off to Sauvegarder Investment Management and renamed SIM IP.

== Russian Financing ==
Eleven Ventures, a shareholder in Spangenberg's SIM/Spectral IP vehicle, has been linked to funding from a trust connected to a Russian-American businessman under US criminal investigation. Between late 2021 and 2023, Eleven Ventures reportedly received a total of $10.8 million from the ES Family Trust, managed by Anton Postolnikov, who is described as the nephew of Putin ally Aleksandr Smirnov.

Postolnikov was the subject of a criminal investigation by the Department of Homeland Security and the Federal Bureau of Investigation (FBI) over his role in the merger between Trump Media and Technology Group and Digital World Acquisition Corporation, which took Donald Trump's platform Truth Social public on the Nasdaq exchange.

Smirnov served in Vladimir Putin's Presidential Executive Office during most of Putin's first two terms, was First Deputy Minister of Justice until 2014, held a position in the Central Office of the Russian government until 2017, and subsequently headed the state-owned maritime company Rosmorport.

Eleven Ventures' principal Hartley Wasko testified that he had invested alongside Michael Shvartsman, who pleaded guilty in 2024 to insider trading connected to the merger.

== Personal life ==
In the early 1990s, Spangenberg married Audrey Spangenberg, and the couple had a son, Christian Spangenberg. Audrey held senior roles and ownership stakes in Spangenberg-affiliated entities: she was chief executive of the software company Firepond, operated through FPX, LLC, and controlled Acclaim Financial Group, LLC, the holding company at the head of the family's patent-litigation network.

Companies controlled by Spangenberg filed numerous patent-infringement lawsuits, including three against Google — two in 2007 and one in 2009. According to court records cited by IP Law & Business, the Spangenbergs had obtained more than $72 million in settlements from defendant companies as of October 2007.

Spangenberg and Audrey later divorced; by early 2018 he described himself as having recently gone through a divorce.
