= Civil clause =

Civil clause (German: Zivilklausel), sometimes civilian clause or civilians' clause, is a voluntary commitment by academic institutions to engage exclusively in civil (i.e. non-military) research.

The idea originates in Japan: In 1950, the Science Council of Japan established that its members will refuse to participate in military-related research projects. Such a declaration was repeated in 1967, and in 2017.

In Germany, Universität Bremen was the first to put a Civil Clause in effect. Its resolution no.5113 from 1986 declared:

Any participation of science and research with military use or purpose must be rejected by the academic senate. In particular the civil clause demands that members of the university reject research projects and funding which could serve weapon technology.

This declaration has been renewed in 1992 and in 2020

Since then, many German universities have followed this example.

- Technische Universität Darmstadt requires:

Research, teaching and studies at Technische Universität Darmstadt exclusively pursue peaceful goals and serve civilian purposes; research, particularly relating to the development and optimisation of technical systems, as well as studies and teaching are focused on civilian use.

- TU Berlin's academic senate decided in 1991:

TU Berlin and its scientific institutions shall not accept contracts of funding for research relevant to weapons. [...] Every applicant of research projects shall declare that the project does not serve military purposes.

- Eberhard Karls Universität Tübingen amended its constitution in 2010 as follows:

Teaching, research, and studies at the university shall serve peaceful purposes, enrich the coexistence of peoples and sustain natural resources.

- Georg-August-Universität Göttingen on February 13 (2013) supplemented the following Civil Clause to its mission statement:

The University pledges its commitment to peace and justice in the world. The University and the academics working therein strive to serve peace in the world through research and teaching. In responsibility for society, they undertake to uphold in their actions the intrinsic ethical principles of science and scholarship.

Civil Clauses can be regarded as contemporary extensions of Merton's norms on scientific ethos.

== List of German Universities with Civil Clauses ==
- Technische Universität Berlin
- Universität Bremen
- Universität Konstanz
- Technische Universität Dortmund
- Carl von Ossietzky Universität Oldenburg
- Christian-Albrechts-Universität zu Kiel
- Technische Universität Ilmenau
- Eberhard Karls Universität Tübingen
- Universität Rostock
- Technische Universität Darmstadt
- Georg-August-Universität Göttingen
- Johann Wolfgang Goethe-Universität Frankfurt am Main
- Westfälische Wilhelms-Universität Münster
- Universität Kassel
- Albert-Ludwigs-Universität Freiburg
