= Jonathan R. Cole =

American sociologist (born 1942)

- Born: August 27, 1942 (age 84)
- Education: Columbia University
- Occupation: Sociologist
- Employer: Columbia University
- Known for: Sociology of science
- Title: John Mitchell Mason Professor of the University, Provost and Dean of Faculties, Emeritus – Columbia University
- Predecessor: Robert F. Goldberger

Jonathan Richard Cole (born August 27, 1942), is an American sociologist, John Mitchell Mason Professor of the University at Columbia University. He is best known for his scholarly work developing the sociology of science and his work on science policy. From 1989 to 2003 he was Columbia's chief academic officer – its Provost and Dean of Faculties.

== Biography ==
He was born in New York City attending New York City public schools, including Jamaica High School. He received his bachelor's degree from Columbia University in 1964, and has spent his entire academic career at Columbia. He received his doctorate from the Department of Sociology in 1969, for a thesis entitled, The Social Structure of Science directed by Robert K. Merton. He served successively as the Director of the Center for the Social Sciences from 1979 to 1987, when he became vice president for Arts and Sciences. After two years, he was named Provost of the University and in 1994 became Provost and Dean of Faculties until 2003.

== Works ==
His scholarly work has focused principally on the development of the sociology of science as an academic field. Columbia's Program in the Sociology of Science, was started with Merton, Harriet Zuckerman, Stephen Cole (his brother) and Jonathan R. Cole as principal investigators with support from the National Science Foundation for 20 years. It produced a substantial body of both theoretical and empirical work. Jonathan and Stephen Cole collaborated on studies of the system of social stratification in science and on the reward system in science examining the extent to which the social system of science approximated a meritocracy. culminating in their book, Social Stratification in Science (University of Chicago Press, 1973). In this early work, they developed the use of citations as a measure of scientific quality and impact, the first social scientists to do so. After meeting with initial resistance, it is today widely used as a measure of scholarly impact and there is a very substantial literature on it.

He subsequently worked on the peer review system in science especially the claim that it was an “old-boys” network of self-reinforcing elites. The study resulted in two volumes on Peer Review in the National Science Foundation, both published by the National Academy of Sciences Press. He also worked on the role of women in science. His early work, Fair Science: Women in the Scientific Community (The Free Press, 1987) was one of the first major empirical works on this; he then carried out a series of studies in collaboration with Harriet Zuckerman. This NSF supported work, with extended interviews with hundreds of men and women scientists (including recorded interviews with scores of many eminent women scientists in the United States), resulted in many published papers and the volume The Outer Circle: Women in the Scientific Community (1991, with Harriet Zuckerman and John Bruer, editors). This work papers explored the relationship between marriage, family, and scientific productivity, and tried to explain the “productivity puzzle” of increasing differences in the scientific publication rates of men and women scientists. It compares the careers and scientific productivity of matched samples of men and women in various fields of science. His interest in science has extended to work on the relationship between science and the media, dealing with the presentation by journalists of problematic scientific findings as “facts.”

In recent years, he has worked on issues in higher education, particularly the great American research universities, and on questions of scientific and technological literacy, intellectual property in the new digital media, and current problems facing research universities generally. In January 2010, his book The Great American University was published (PublicAffairs, Perseus Publishing Group, 2010).

Between 1987 and 2003 he was primarily an academic administrator. After two years as vice president for Arts and Sciences, Jonathan R. Cole was Columbia's chief academic officer for 14 years – the second longest tenure as Provost in the University's 250-year history. During these years, he has served three University presidents. In 2003, he returned to the faculty as John Mitchell Mason Professor of the University.

== Awards and honors ==
He was a Fellow at the Center for Advanced Study in the Behavioral Sciences in 1975–76; in the same year, he was awarded a John Simon Guggenheim Foundation Fellowship. He spent the 1986–87 as a visiting scholar at the Russell Sage Foundation. In 1992, he was elected a Fellow of the American Academy of Arts and Sciences; in 2003, a “National Associate” of the United States National Academies of Science, in 2004 a member of the Council on Foreign Relations. In 2004, he was elected a Fellow of the American Association for the Advancement of Science, and in 2005, he was elected to membership in the American Philosophical Society. He has been honored twice by the Government of Italy, as Ufficiale in 1994 and as Commendatore of the Ordine al Merito della Repubblica Italiana in 2003 for his work in creating the Italian Academy for Advanced Studies in America.

== Publications ==
=== Books ===
Higher education

- Noncoercive Threats to Academic, Political, and Economic Freedom. Editor (with Akeel Bilgrami): Columbia University Press. 2025.
- Unfreedom in Liberal Democracies. Editor (with Akeel Bilgrami): Columbia University Press. 2024.
- Toward a More Perfect University. Public Affairs, 2016
- Who's Afraid of Academic Freedom? Editor (with Akeel Bilgrami) : Columbia University Press. 2015
- The Great American University: Its Rise to Preeminence, Its Indispensable National Role, Why It Must Be Protected Public Affairs, 2010
- The Research University in a Time of Discontent Baltimore Editor (with Elinor G. Barber and Stephen R. Graubard) : Johns Hopkins University Press. 1994

Sociology of Science

- Smoother Pebbles: Essays in the Sociology of Science. Columbia University Press. 2024
- The Outer Circle: Women in the Scientific Community. Editor (with Harriet Zuckerman and John Bruer) : New York: W. W. Norton & Company. 1991. Paperback edition, New Haven: Yale University Press, 1993.
- Fair Science: Women in the Scientific Community, New York: The Free Press. 1979. Paperback edition with a new preface, New York: Columbia University Press, 1987.
- Peer Review in the National Science Foundation: Phase One of a Study, Washington, D.C.: National Academy of Sciences Press (Stephen Cole, Leonard Rubin and Jonathan R. Cole). 1978.
- Social Stratification in Science. Chicago, Illinois: The University of Chicago Press. Paperback edition, University of Chicago Press, 1981. Sections reprinted in many sources. Translated into Chinese, People's Republic of China, 1999. (Jonathan R. Cole and Stephen Cole).
- The Social Structure of Science. Doctoral Dissertation, Columbia University. Dissertation Abstracts International (AAT6920169) (Thesis Advisor: Robert K. Merton) 1969

=== In the Media ===
Cole has written on the topic of higher education for The Atlantic, The New York Times, Daedalus (journal), The Washington Post, HuffPost and other outlets.

=== Journal articles ===
Cole has also published over 40 journal articles.
