= Thryv, Inc. v. Click-To-Call Technologies, LP =

- Supreme Court of the United States

Argued December 9, 2019 Decided April 20, 2020
- Full case name: Thryv, Inc. v. Click-To-Call Technologies, LP
- Docket no.: 18-916
- Citations: 590 U.S. 45 (more) 140 S. Ct. 1367 (2020)
- Argument: Oral argument

Holding
- Inter partes review decisions by the United States Patent and Trademark Office are not judicially reviewable.

Court membership
- Chief Justice John Roberts Associate Justices Clarence Thomas · Ruth Bader Ginsburg; Stephen Breyer · Samuel Alito; Sonia Sotomayor · Elena Kagan; Neil Gorsuch · Brett Kavanaugh

Case opinions
- Majority: Ginsburg, joined by Roberts, Breyer, Kagan, Kavanaugh; Thomas, Alito (except as to Part III–C)
- Dissent: Gorsuch, joined by Sotomayor (Parts I, II, III, and IV)

Laws applied
- 35 U.S.C. § 314, 35 U.S.C. § 315

Thryv, Inc. v. Click-to-Call Technologies, LP, 590 U.S. 45, was a 2020 decision by the United States Supreme Court regarding whether inter partes review decisions by the United States Patent and Trademark Office were subject to judicial review. Writing for the majority, Justice Ruth Bader Ginsburg issued an opinion finding that such decisions were not judicially reviewable. Justices Neil Gorsuch and Sonia Sotomayor dissented from the majority's ruling, arguing that neither Congress or the Constitution authorized a lack of judicial review of such decisions.

== Background ==
In 1998, the Patent Office awarded U.S. Patent No. 5,818,836 to Stephen DuVal for an invention pertaining to anonymizing telephone calls. Duval licensed the patent to InfoRocket.com, Inc. In 2001, InfoRocket sued a predecessor of Thryv, Inc., alleging that Thryv had infringed upon the '836 patent. Following protected litigation that involved challenges to the validity of the '836 patent, the parties settled their claims and jointly dismissed the lawsuit.

In 2011, Duval transferred the license of the '836 patent to Click-to-Call who then proceeded to file a new patent infringement lawsuit against Thryv. In response to this new lawsuit, Thryv filed a petition for inter partes review with the patent office seeking to invalidate the patent. Click-to-Call argued that Thryv's petition was untimely because, under 35 U.S.C. § 315(b), no inter partes review proceeding can be initiated more than 1 year after being served with a complaint alleging patent infringement. The Patent Office rejected this argument, finding that, because the 2001 lawsuit had been voluntarily dismissed, Section 315(b) did not serve as a bar to inter partes review.

Click-to-Call subsequently appealed the Patent Office's determination to the United States Court of Appeals for the Federal Circuit. The Federal Circuit, sitting en banc, ruled in Click-to-Call's favor, holding that, while 35 U.S.C. § 314(d) generally barred judicial review of the Patent Office's decision to institute inter partes review, there was no evidence that Congress specifically intended for determinations regarding the 1-year bar to be unreviewable. The decision was issued by a sharply divided court, with several Federal Circuit judges dissenting. On June 24, 2019, the Supreme Court granted certiorari and held oral argument on December 9, 2019.

== Decision ==
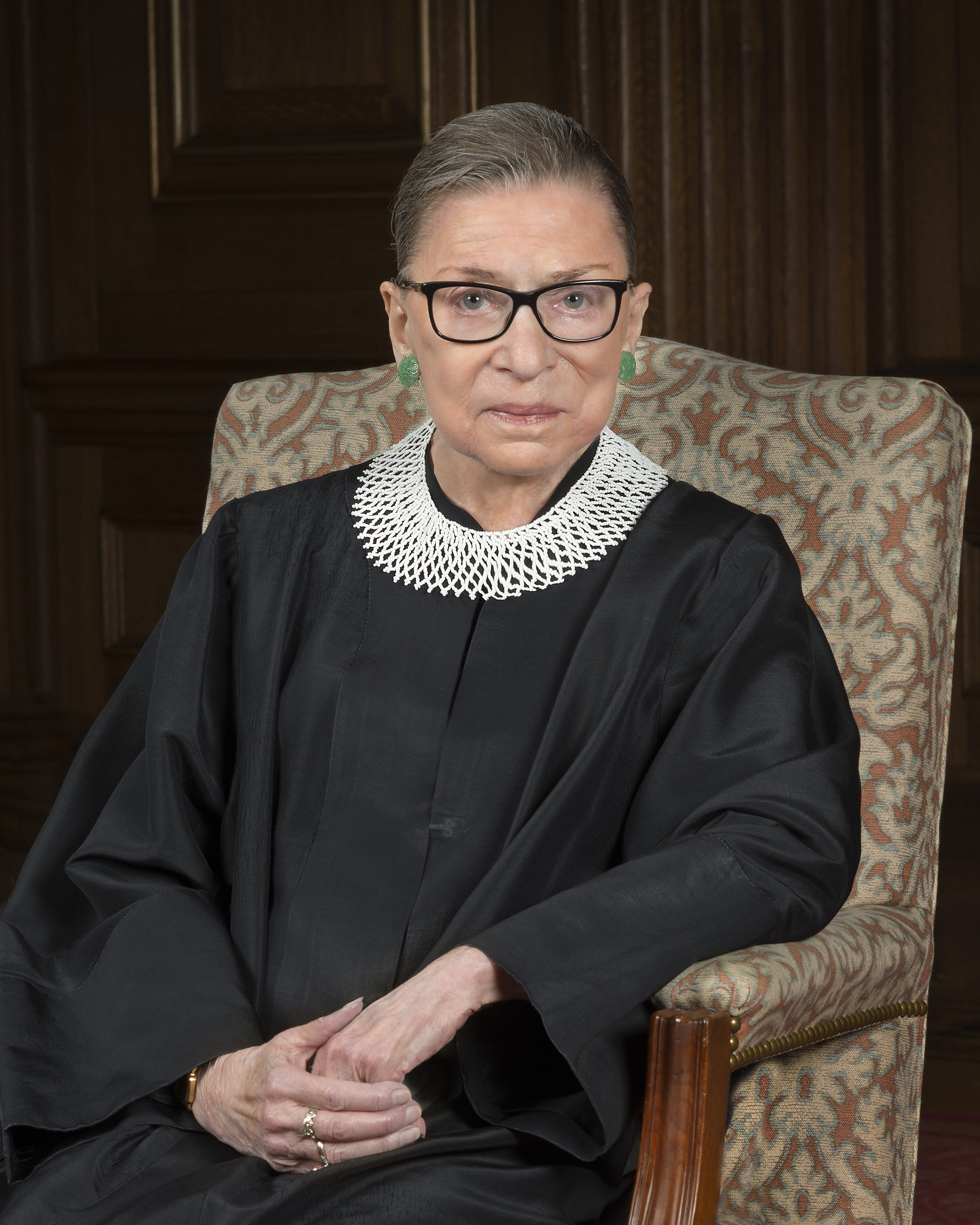
Justice Ginsburg authored the Court's majority opinion.

The Supreme Court issued its ruling on April 20, 2020. Writing for a seven justice majority, Justice Ginsburg held that Section 314(d) bars courts from reviewing determinations regarding the 1-year time bar to filing inter partes review petitions. Justice Ginsburg's opinion rested heavily on the Court's 2016 decision in Cuozzo Speed Technologies, LLC v. Lee, which had upheld the constitutionality of inter partes review generally and the validity of Section 314(d) specifically.

Justices Gorsuch and Sotomayor dissented from the majority's ruling. In their view, it was improper to limit the ability of the judiciary to review administrative agency determinations. Justice Gorsuch in particular re-emphasized his stance from Oil States Energy Services, LLC v. Greene's Energy Group, LLC that it was improper for an administrative agency to revoke an intellectual property right without meaningful judicial review.

== Reaction ==
Reaction among the legal community was mixed. Writing for SCOTUSBlog, John Duffy described the opinion as having relatively little impact on the state of American patent law, but potentially representing a "a tiny skirmish in a much larger war" surrounding the review-ability of administrative decisions by American courts. Over at IPWatchDog, Gene Quinn criticized the Court's ruling as giving the Patent Office free license to invalidate patents without concern of meaningful judicial review.
