= Middle-range theory =

Middle-range theory may refer to:

- Middle-range theory (archaeology), describes how people use objects and structures, and the human behaviors associated with this use
- Middle-range theory (sociology), a theory with limited scope, that explains a specific set of phenomena
