= Peter Hedström =

Peter Hedström may refer to:

- Peter Hedström (sociologist) (born 1955)
- Peter Hedström (racing driver) (born 1983)
