= Recuperation =

Recuperation can refer to:

- Recuperation (recovery), a period of physical or mental recovery
- Recuperation (politics), a concept of cultural normalisation of radical ideas
- Convalescence, the gradual recovery of health
- Recuperation (electric vehicles), the process by which electric vehicles recharge their batteries through Regenerative braking when braking to decelerate or stop
