= Social Theory and Social Structure =

1949 book by Robert K. Merton

- First edition
- Author: Robert K. Merton
- Language: English
- Genre: Sociology
- Publisher: The Free Press
- Publication date: 1949

Social Theory and Social Structure (STSS) was a landmark publication in sociology by Robert K. Merton. It has been translated into close to 20 languages and is one of the most frequently cited texts in social sciences. It was first published in 1949, although revised editions of 1957 and 1968 are often cited. In 1998 the International Sociological Association listed this work as the third most important sociological book of the 20th century.

The book introduced many important concepts in sociology, like: manifest and latent functions and dysfunctions, obliteration by incorporation, reference groups, self-fulfilling prophecy, middle-range theory and others.
