= Mechanism (sociology) =

The term social mechanisms and mechanism-based explanations of social phenomena originate from the philosophy of science.

The core thinking behind the mechanism approach has been expressed as follows by Elster (1989: 3-4): “To explain an event is to give an account of why it happened. Usually… this takes the form of citing an earlier event as the cause of the event we want to explain…. [But] to cite the cause is not enough: the causal mechanism must also be provided, or at least suggested.”

Mario Bunge (1999: 21) has defined a mechanism as “a process in a concrete system, such that it is capable of bringing about or preventing some change in the system as a whole or in some of its subsystems.”

Existing definitions differ a great deal from one another, but underlying them all is an emphasis on making intelligible the regularities being observed by specifying in detail how they were brought about. The currently most satisfactory discussion of the mechanism concept is found in Machamer, Darden and Craver (2000). Following them, mechanisms can be said to consist of entities (with their properties) and the activities that these entities engage in, either by themselves or in concert with other entities. These activities bring about change, and the type of change brought about depends upon the properties and activities of the entities and the relations between them. A mechanism, thus defined, refers to a constellation of entities and activities that are organized such that they regularly bring about a particular type of outcome, and we explain an observed outcome by referring to the mechanism by which such outcomes are regularly brought about (see also Hedström and Ylikoski 2010).

== See also ==
- Mechanism (philosophy)
- Analytical sociology
- Critical realism
- Generalized exchange
- Methodological individualism
- Explanation
- Explanandum and explanans
