= Oil States Energy Services, LLC v. Greene's Energy Group, LLC =

Oil States Energy Services v. Greene's Energy Group, LLC
- Supreme Court of the United States

Argued November 27, 2017 Decided April 24, 2018
- Full case name: Oil States Energy Services, LLC v. Greene's Energy Group, LLC
- Docket no.: 16-712
- Citations: 584 U.S. 325 (more) 138 S. Ct. 1365; 200 L. Ed. 2d 671; 126 U.S.P.Q.2d 1293

Case history
- Prior: 639 F. App'x 639 (Fed. Cir. 2016); cert. granted, 137 S. Ct. 2239 (2017).

Holding
- The inter partes review process granted by Congress to the United States Patent and Trademark Office is constitutional.

Court membership
- Chief Justice John Roberts Associate Justices Anthony Kennedy · Clarence Thomas; Ruth Bader Ginsburg · Stephen Breyer; Samuel Alito · Sonia Sotomayor; Elena Kagan · Neil Gorsuch

Case opinions
- Majority: Thomas, joined by Kennedy, Ginsburg, Breyer, Alito, Sotomayor, Kagan
- Concurrence: Breyer, joined by Ginsburg, Sotomayor
- Dissent: Gorsuch, joined by Roberts

Oil States Energy Services, LLC v. Greene's Energy Group, LLC, 584 U.S. 325 (2018), was a United States Supreme Court case in which the Court held that the inter partes review process granted by Congress to the United States Patent and Trademark Office for challenging the validity of patents, rather than a jury trial, is constitutional and did not violate either Article III of the Constitution nor the Seventh Amendment.

== Background ==
The United States Congress passed the Leahy–Smith America Invents Act in 2012. Among its provisions, the Act gave the United States Patent and Trademark Office (USPTO) the ability to handle challenges to patent validity following their granting through an improved inter partes review process. Prior to the Act's passage, a party could request USPTO to initiate a full re-examination of a patent, which was a lengthy and costly process for the office. Alternatively, the party could challenge the patent through a jury trial within the Circuit Court system. With the new inter partes review process, a party can seek to invalidate specific claims of a patent based on published prior art by filing a petition with the USPTO. The owner of the patent may then file a response to the petition. The Patent Trial and Appeal Board (PTAB) then reviews the materials, and if it deems there is a reasonable challenge, it will hold a trial hearing with the parties, and issue a ruling on the validity of the claims in question. This process was designed to reduce the time and costs of dealing with inter partes challenges to patents.

Since its implementation, the inter partes review process has come under some criticism. Large tech firms support the process as it enables them to fend off patent infringement challenges from patent trolls without extensive costs. In contrast, biomedical and pharmaceutical firms are critical of the process since it is a non-judicial review by which rival companies can challenge and invalidate their patents, which often are the product of extensive time and costs for research and development. The inter partes review process has led the PTAB being called the "patent death squad", a term coined by Randall Rader, a former Chief Judge on the Federal Appeals Court.

=== Procedural history ===
Oil States Energy Services, LLC had gained ownership of a 2001 patent related to protection of oilwells. In 2012, Oil States filed a patent infringement lawsuit within the United States District Court for the Eastern District of Texas against Greene's Energy Group, LLC, claiming that Greene's Energy were violating their oilwell protection patent. In addition to defending itself and attempting to prove the patent was invalid in the District Court, Greene's Energy filed a petition for an inter partes review with PTAB to challenge two of the claims of Oil States' patent, which if found invalid, would nullify the patent infringement claims. Following receipt of Oil States' response to the petition, the PTAB found that there was a likelihood that Greene's Energy's challenge would prevail and initiated the inter partes review.

Both the District Court trial and the inter partes review ran simultaneously. While District Court denied summary judgment to Greene’s Energy, allowing the case to proceed, the PTAB ruled that the two claims were invalid and cancelled Oil States’ patents. Oil States appealed PTAB's decision to the United States Court of Appeals for the Federal Circuit, both on the patentability of the claims in question, as well as challenging the inter partes review process. Oil States stated that patents were considered to be a private right, and challenges to patent validity is a judicial process requiring a jury trial. Therefore, they claimed the inter partes review process violated Article III of the Constitution and the Seventh Amendment. Because Oil States' appeal challenged the America Invents Acts, the federal government joined as a respondent to the case. Both Greene's Energy and the federal government called upon the Federal Circuit decision in MCM Portfolio LLC v. Hewlett-Packard Co., which had ruled in a similar manner that the USPTO's patent granting authority was "a federal regulatory scheme" and considered a public right based on the Supreme Court's ruling in Stern v. Marshall, and that the inter partes review did not violate Article III nor the Seventh Amendment. While MCM Portfolio was petitioned to the Supreme Court, it declined to hear the case at that time.

The Federal Circuit Appeals Court summarily affirmed the PTAB's ruling, leading Oil States' to petition the Supreme Court for a writ of certiorari to hear the case in November 2016. The Court granted certiorari in June 2017 specifically to address the Article III and Seventh Amendment questions raised by Oil States.

== Supreme Court ==
The case was heard by the Court on November 27, 2017, and announced judgment against Oil States on April 24, 2018. Voting 7–2 to affirm the lower court, the Court held that the inter partes review process did not violate Article III or the Seventh Amendment.

=== Opinion of the Court ===
The majority decision was written by Justice Clarence Thomas and joined by Justices Anthony Kennedy, Ruth Bader Ginsburg, Stephen Breyer, Samuel Alito, Sonia Sotomayor and Elena Kagan. Thomas asserted that the granting of a patent was a public right and more specifically, a public franchise, and as found in Louisville Bridge Co. v. United States, the government can authorize and deauthorize that franchise to a private entity without intercession of an Article III court. Thomas stated that the inter partes review "is simply a reconsideration of that grant, and Congress has permissibly reserved the PTO's authority to conduct that reconsideration". The Court stated that its opinion did not contradict established case law that patents are private property, such as found in United States v. American Bell Telephone Co., only that the granting and re-examination of patents falls within the public rights managed by the Executive Branch.

=== Concurrence ===
Justice Breyer filed a concurrence that was joined by Ginsburg and Sotomayor. While Breyer agreed in full with the majority opinion, he stated that precedent held that even matters dealing with private rights do not require adjudication by Article III courts and can be performed by government agencies.

=== Dissent ===
Justice Neil Gorsuch wrote the dissenting opinion, joined by Chief Justice John Roberts. Gorsuch wrote that patents had generally been considered to be a personal right "that the federal government could revoke only with the concurrence of independent judges" and that the majority opinion set a precedent that "invites us to retreat from the promise of judicial independence."
