= Inter partes review =

US legal procedure for challenging a patent's validity

In United States patent law, an inter partes review (IPR) is a procedure for challenging the validity of a United States patent before the United States Patent and Trademark Office.

== History ==
The inter partes review procedure was enacted on September 16, 2012 as part of the America Invents Act. It replaced a previous review procedure called inter partes reexamination, which in turn stemmed from ex parte reexamination proceedings. Under the ex parte system, any person at any time could challenge the validity of a patent on the basis that its claims were obvious or not new based on prior art. Under post-2012 inter partes review, petitioners must demonstrate a "reasonable likelihood that" the party challenging the patent at issue "would prevail" in the dispute, rather than requiring that it demonstrate a "substantial new question of patentability."

== Process ==
An inter partes review is used to challenge the patentability of one or more claims in a U.S. patent only on a ground that could be raised under 35 U.S.C. §§ 102 (novelty) or 103 (non-obviousness), and only on the basis of prior art consisting of patents or printed publications. The procedure is conducted by the Patent Trial and Appeal Board (PTAB). Whereas patent validity used to require a jury trial within the District Courts, the inter partes review process allows the PTAB to hold a hearing with the respective parties and make its decision from that. Appeals to a PTAB's decision are heard by the United States Court of Appeals for the Federal Circuit. This process is designed to reduce the costs and time of litigating patents; a jury trial may require millions of dollars to be spent by parties, while an inter partes review can cost only hundreds of thousands of dollars or less in some cases.

One may still issue a patent challenge in a District Court, rather than request an inter partes review. As of mid-2017, over a thousand patents have been cancelled as a result of the inter partes review process, and there were more inter partes review cases heard through mid-2017 compared to any individual circuit court.

== Commentary and legal challenges ==
The adoption of the inter partes review has had mixed reactions from American companies. Large technology firms, like Apple, Google, Intel and Amazon, support the system and have used the inter partes review process to challenge uncertain patents held by those who they perceive to be patent trolls and to fend off challenges to their own patents from other firms. For example, Apple had sought an inter partes review of patents owned by VirnetX; VirnetX had taken Apple to court over patent violations, which found in favor for VirnetX and resulted in Apple fines over US$1 billion. Should Apple succeed in its inter partes review, it would be able to nullify the decision of this patent infringement suits.

Other industries, particularly in the biomedical and pharmaceutical arenas, are critical of the inter partes review as it allows rivals to easily challenge their patents, which generally represent the culmination of large amounts of research and development time and costs. One well-reported case of this was Kyle Bass, who manages the Coalition for Affordable Drugs (CFAD). Bass challenged the validity of 28 pharmaceutical corporations' patents through the inter partes review process, claiming that he wanted to invalidate weak patents imposing costs on consumers, thus making drugs covered by those patents more affordable. The drug companies targeted by Bass allege that the sole purpose of the validity challenges was to allow Bass to short the market and thus profit from the change in companies' stock prices. However, at least one event study indicates that if Bass had in fact pursued such a strategy, he could not have profited, because his "petitions for inter partes review ... did not consistently produce statistically significant negative returns in the patent holders' share prices."

Randall Rader, a former Chief Judge on the Federal Appeals Court, criticized the inter partes review process, as the small number of administrative judges on the PTAB would be "acting as death squads, killing property rights". The "patent death squad" term has since been used frequently as reference to the PTAB by those critical of the inter partes review.

Opponents of the inter partes review have sought both changes in legislation through the United States Congress, as well as seeking case ruling.

=== Sovereign immunity ===
The Patent Trial and Appeal Board ruled in 2017 that patents of the University of Florida could not be challenged because it had sovereign immunity under the Eleventh Amendment to the United States Constitution as part of the government of Florida. Some patent law firms then began advising patent holders to sell them to and lease back from native American tribes which have tribal sovereignty. In 2018, a federal appeals court ruled that tribal sovereignty did not protect these patents from challenge, as the PTO was simply reconsidering its previous actions.

=== Cuozzo Speed Tech v. Lee (2016) ===
In 2016, the Supreme Court ruled in Cuozzo Speed Technologies, LLC v. Lee that the patent agency was within the scope of the law to issue regulations that construe claims in an issued patent according to their "broadest reasonable interpretation," rather than on a more restrictive reading based on their "plain and ordinary meaning," as is the custom in courts. This determination was grounded in Chevron U.S.A., Inc. v. Natural Resources Defense Council, Inc. ("Chevron deference"), which set forth the legal test for determining whether to grant deference to a government agency's interpretation of a statute which it administers when the text is ambiguous. They additionally opined that the standard was in line with the public purpose of patent law, since construing a patent claim according to its broadest reasonable construction helps to protect the public by increasing the likelihood that a patent examiner will deny a patent claim on the basis that it is too broad, thereby encouraging applicants to draft their claims narrowly and preventing patents "from tying up too much knowledge, while helping members of the public draw useful information from the disclosed invention and better understand the lawful limits of the claim."

The decision also affirmed that the PTAB's decision to grant an IPR proceeding is not appealable to the Federal courts, as the text of §314(d) of the statute expressly states that such decisions "shall be final and nonappealable."

=== Oil States v. Greene's Energy (2018) ===
In April 2018, the Supreme Court ruled in Oil States Energy Services, LLC v. Greene's Energy Group, LLC that validated the constitutionality of the inter partes review. The legal question asked to the Court was whether Congress violated the Constitution (specifically, either Article III or the Seventh Amendment) by giving the PTAB judicial powers through the inter partes review that otherwise belong to the judicial system. In the 7–2 decision, the Court found that the granting of patents is considered a public right, and Congress has the authority to grant the Patent Office the ability to reconsider their grants as being a public right.

=== SAS Institute Inc. v. Iancu (2018) ===
At the same time as the Oil States ruling, the Supreme Court ruled in SAS Institute Inc. v. Iancu that the PTAB must include a decision on each claim that is challenged within an inter partes review, even if only a portion of those claims are reviewed during proceedings. By having the PTAB decide on each challenged claim, those claims cannot be re-challenged in another case, outside of appeals of the PTAB review.

=== Thryv, Inc. v. Click-To-Call Technologies, LP (2020) ===
In 2020, the Supreme Court ruled in Thryv, Inc. v. Click-To-Call Technologies, LP that decisions to institute or not institute inter partes review, including determinations as to the 1-year bar date for filing an inter partes review petition, were not subject to judicial review.

== See also ==
- Opposition proceedings
