= Manifest and latent functions and dysfunctions =

Concept in Social Science

Manifest and latent functions are social scientific concepts created by anthropologist Bronisław Malinowski in 1922 while studying the Trobriand Islanders in the Western Pacific. It was later modified for sociology by Robert K. Merton. Merton appeared interested in sharpening the conceptual tools to be employed in a functional analysis.

Each system in society has a specific function that relies on and is associated to other systems. When these systems function, it leads to social stability. Dysfunction in one or more systems leads to social instability. Both functions and dysfunctions can be latent or manifest. Manifest functions or dysfunctions are deliberate and known. While latent functions or dysfunctions are unintended and/or go unrecognized by many. Positive or negative values are not attached to functions or dysfunctions. In other words, things that are often viewed by people as wrong or harmful can lead to social stability as much as things that are commonly viewed as right or fair.

Merton wrote:

the distinction between manifest and latent functions was devised to preclude ... confusion ... between conscious motivations for social behaviour and its objective consequences

— Robert K. Merton, Social Theory and Social Structure, 1957, page 61

Merton noted that he has "... adapted the terms "manifest" and "latent" from their use in another context by Freud...".

== Functions ==
Manifest functions are the consequences that people see, observe or even expect. It is explicitly stated and understood by the participants in the relevant action. The manifest function of a rain dance, according to Merton in his 1957 Social Theory and Social Structure, is to produce rain, and this outcome is intended and desired by people participating in the ritual.

Latent functions are those that are neither recognized nor intended. A latent function of a behavior is not explicitly stated, recognized, or intended by the people involved. Thus, they are identified by observers. In the example of rain ceremony, the latent function reinforces the group identity by providing a regular opportunity for the members of a group to meet and engage in a common activity.

Peter L. Berger describes a series of examples illustrating the differences between manifest functions and latent dysfunctions:

"...the “manifest” function of antigambling legislation may be to suppress gambling, its “latent” function to create an illegal empire for the gambling syndicates. Or Christian missions in parts of Africa “manifestly” tried to convert Africans to Christianity, “latently” helped to destroy the indigenous tribal cultures and this provided an important impetus towards rapid social transformation. Or the control of the Communist Party over all sectors of social life in Russia “manifestly” was to assure the continued dominance of the revolutionary ethos, “latently” created a new class of comfortable bureaucrats uncannily bourgeois in its aspirations and increasingly disinclined toward the self-denial of Bolshevik dedication (nomenklatura). Or the “manifest” function of many voluntary associations in America is sociability and public service, the “latent” function to attach status indices to those permitted to belong to such associations.” "

While Talcott Parsons tends to emphasize the manifest functions of social behavior, Merton sees attention to latent functions as increasing the understanding of society: the distinction between manifest and latent forces the sociologist to go beyond the reasons individuals give for their actions or for the existence of customs and institutions; it makes them look for other social consequences that allow these practices’ survival and illuminate the way society works.

== Dysfunctions ==
Dysfunctions can also be manifest or latent. While functions are intended or recognized (manifest), and may have a positive effect on society, dysfunctions are unintended or unrecognized, and have a negative effect on society.

Manifest dysfunctions are anticipated disruptions of social life. For example, a manifest dysfunction of a festival might include disruptions of transportation and excessive production of garbage. Latent dysfunctions are unintended and unanticipated disruptions of order and stability. In the festival example, they would be represented by people missing work due to the traffic jam.

== See also ==
- Structural functionalism
- Unintended consequences
