= Stephen Cole (sociologist) =

American sociologist (1941–2018)

Stephen Cole (June 1, 1941 – September 7, 2018) was an American sociologist, who was a Distinguished Professor Emeritus of Sociology at Stony Brook University (retired since 2011).

His scholarly work was on the development of the sociology of science as an academic field. He was a founding member of Columbia's Program in the Sociology of Science, along with Robert K. Merton, Harriet Zuckerman, and his brother Jonathan R. Cole. The project was supported by the National Science Foundation for 20 years and produced a substantial body of both theoretical and empirical work.

He collaborated with his brother Jonathan Cole on studies of the system of social stratification in science and on the reward system in science, examining the extent to which the social system of science approximated a meritocracy, culminating in their co-authored book, Social Stratification in Science (University of Chicago Press, 1973). In this work, they developed the use of citations as a measure of scientific quality and impact, the first social scientists to do so. Although it met with initial resistance, it is today widely used as a measure of scholarly impact, and there is a very substantial literature on it.

Cole also published works dealing with the sociology of education as a profession, with racial discrimination in science, and several widely used textbooks.

== Publications ==
=== Books ===
- Cole, Stephen. The Unionization of Teachers: A Case Study of the UFT. New York: Praeger, 1969.
- Cole, Stephen. The Sociological Method. Chicago: Markham Pub. Co, 1972.
- Cole, Jonathan R., and Stephen Cole. Social Stratification in Science. Chicago: University of Chicago Press, 1973.
- Cole, Stephen. The Sociological Orientation: An Introduction to Sociology. Chicago: Rand McNally College Pub. Co, 1975.
- Cole, Stephen, Leonard Rubin, and Jonathan R. Cole. Peer Review in the National Science Foundation: Phase One of a Study : Prepared for the Committee on Science and Public Policy of the National Academy of Sciences. Washington: The Academy, 1978. 2 vol.
- Cole, Stephen, Leonard Rubin, and Jonathan R. Cole. Peer Review in the National Science Foundation: Phase Two of a Study National Academy of Sciences. Washington: The Academy, 1981
- Cole, Stephen. The Sociological Method: An Introduction to the Science of Sociology. Chicago: Rand McNally Pub. Co, 1980. 3rd ed.
- Cole, Stephen. Making Science: Between Nature and Society. Cambridge, Mass: Harvard University Press, 1992.
- Cole, Stephen. (editor) What's Wrong with Sociology? New Brunswick, NJ : Transaction Publ, 2001.
- Cole, Stephen, and Elinor G. Barber. Increasing Faculty Diversity: The Occupational Choices of High-Achieving Minority Students. Cambridge, Mass: Harvard University Press, 2003. ISBN 978-0-674-00945-5
  - Review: "Liberal Study: Affirmative Action Hurts Blacks" by: Robin Wilson, Chronicle of Higher Education Thursday, January 30, 2003

=== Journal articles ===
He has also published several dozen journal articles.
