= Middle-range theory (sociology) =

Sociological concept merging theory and empirical study

Middle-range theory, developed by Robert K. Merton, is an approach to sociological theorizing aimed at integrating theory and empirical research. It is currently the de facto dominant approach to sociological theory construction, especially in the United States.

Middle-range theory starts with an empirical phenomenon (as opposed to a broad abstract entity like the social system) and abstracts from it to create general statements that can be verified by data. This approach stands in contrast to the earlier "grand" theorizing of social theory, such as functionalism and many conflict theories. Raymond Boudon has argued that "middle-range" theory is the same concept that most other sciences simply call "theory".

The analytical sociology movement has as its aim the unification of such theories into a coherent paradigm at a greater level of abstraction.

== Definition ==
Sociological theory, if it is to advance significantly, must proceed on these interconnected planes: (1) by developing special theories from which to derive hypotheses that can be empirically investigated and (2) by evolving a progressively more general conceptual scheme that is adequate to consolidate groups of special theories.

— Robert K. Merton, Social Theory and Social Structure

The term "middle-range theory" does not refer to a specific theory, but is rather an approach to theory construction. Raymond Boudon defines middle-range theory as a commitment to two ideas. The first is positive, and describes what such theories should do: sociological theories, like all scientific theories, should aim to consolidate otherwise segregated hypotheses and empirical regularities; "if a 'theory' is valid, it 'explains' and in other words 'consolidates' and federates empirical regularities which on their side would appear otherwise segregated." The other is negative, and it relates to what theory cannot do: "it is hopeless and quixotic to try to determine the overarching independent variable that would operate in all social processes, or to determine the essential feature of social structure, or to find out the two, three, or four couples of concepts ... that would be sufficient to analyze all social phenomena".

== History ==
The midrange approach was developed by Robert Merton as a departure from the general social theorizing of Talcott Parsons. Merton agreed with Parsons that a narrow empiricism consisting entirely of simple statistical or observational regularities cannot arrive at successful theory. However, he found that Parsons' "formulations were remote from providing a problematics and a direction for theory-oriented empirical inquiry into the observable worlds of culture and society". He was thus directly opposed to the abstract theorizing of scholars who are engaged in the attempt to construct a total theoretical system covering all aspects of social life. With the introduction of the middle-range theory programme, he advocated that sociologists should concentrate on measurable aspects of social reality that can be studied as separate social phenomena, rather than attempting to explain the entire social world. He saw both the middle-range theory approach and middle-range theories themselves as temporary: when they matured, as natural sciences already had, the body of middle-range theories would become a system of universal laws; but, until that time, social sciences should avoid trying to create a universal theory.

Merton's original foil in the construction was Talcott Parsons, whose action theory C. Wright Mills later classified as a "grand theory". (Parsons vehemently rejected this categorization.) Middle-range theories are normally constructed by applying theory-building techniques to empirical research, which produce generic propositions about the social world, which in turn can also be empirically tested. Examples of middle-range theories are theories of reference groups, social mobility, normalization processes, role conflict and the formation of social norms. The middle-range approach has played a role in turning sociology into an increasingly empirically oriented discipline. This was also important in post-war thought.

In the post-war period, middle-range theory became the dominant approach to theory construction in all variable-based social sciences. Middle-range theory has also been applied to the archaeological realm by Lewis R. Binford, and to financial theory by Robert C. Merton, Robert K. Merton's son.

In the recent decades, the analytical sociology programme has emerged as an attempt synthesizing middle-range theories into a more coherent abstract framework (as Merton had hoped would eventually happen). Peter Hedström at Oxford is the scholar most associated with this approach, while Peter Bearman is its most prominent American advocate.

== Quotes ==
- "...what might be called theories of the middle range: theories intermediate to the minor working hypotheses evolved in abundance during the day-by-day routine of research, and the all-inclusive speculations comprising a master conceptual scheme." — Robert K. Merton, Social Theory and Social Structure
- "Our major task today is to develop special theories applicable to limited conceptual ranges – theories, for example, of deviant behavior, the unanticipated consequences of purposive action, social perception, reference groups, social control, the interdependence of social institutions – rather than to seek the total conceptual structure that is adequate to derive these and other theories of the middle range." — Robert K. Merton
