= Obliteration by incorporation =

Well-known ideas are not often attributed

In sociology of science, obliteration by incorporation (OBI) occurs when at some stage in the development of a science, certain ideas become so universally accepted and commonly used that their contributors are no longer cited. Eventually, its source and creator are forgotten ("obliterated") as the concept enters common knowledge (is "incorporated"). Obliteration occurs when "the sources of an idea, finding or concept, become obliterated by incorporation in canonical knowledge, so that only a few are still aware of their parentage".

== Concept ==
The concept was introduced by Robert K. Merton in 1949, although some incorrectly attribute it to Eugene Garfield, whose work contributed to the popularization of Merton's theory. Merton introduced the concept of "obliteration by incorporation" in the 1968 enlarged edition of his landmark work Social Theory and Social Structure (pp. 28, 35). Merton also introduced the less known counterpart to this concept, adumbrationism, meaning the attribution of insights, ideas or analogies absent from original works.

In the process of "obliteration by incorporation", both the original idea and the literal formulations of it are forgotten due to prolonged and widespread use, and enter into everyday language (or at least the everyday language of a given academic discipline), no longer being attributed to their creator.

Thus they become similar to common knowledge. Merton notes that this process is much more common in highly codified fields of natural sciences than in social sciences. It can also lead to ignoring or hiding the early sources of recent ideas under the claims of novelty and originality. Allan Chapman notes that 'obliteration by incorporation' often affects famous individuals, to whom attribution becomes considered as obvious and unnecessary, thus leading to their exclusion from citations, even if they and their ideas have been mentioned in the text. Marianne Ferber and Eugene Garfield concur with Chapman, noting that obliteration often occurs when the citation count and reputation of an affected scientist have already reached levels much higher than average.

The obliteration phenomenon is a concept in library and information science, referring to the tendency for truly ground-breaking research papers to fail to be cited after the ideas they put forward are fully accepted into the orthodox world view. For example, Albert Einstein's paper on the theory of relativity is rarely cited in modern research papers on physical cosmology, despite its direct relevance.

== Examples ==
Many terms and phrases were so evocative that they quickly suffered the fate of 'obliteration by incorporation'. Examples include:

- double helix structure of DNA, introduced by James D. Watson and Francis Crick
- periodic table of elements, introduced by Dmitri Mendeleev
- self-fulfilling prophecy, introduced by Robert K. Merton
- role model, introduced by Robert K. Merton
- deconstruction, introduced by Jacques Derrida

== See also ==
- Citation analysis
- Genericized trademark
- Law of eponymy: Chicago historian of statistics Stephen M. Stigler has written about a "law of eponymy" whereby "no scientific discovery is named after its original discoverer." Examples: America was not discovered by Americus Vespucci, the Gaussian distribution was not discovered by Gauss.
- Matthew effect
- Recuperation (politics)
