= Robert K. Merton =

American sociologist (1910–2003)

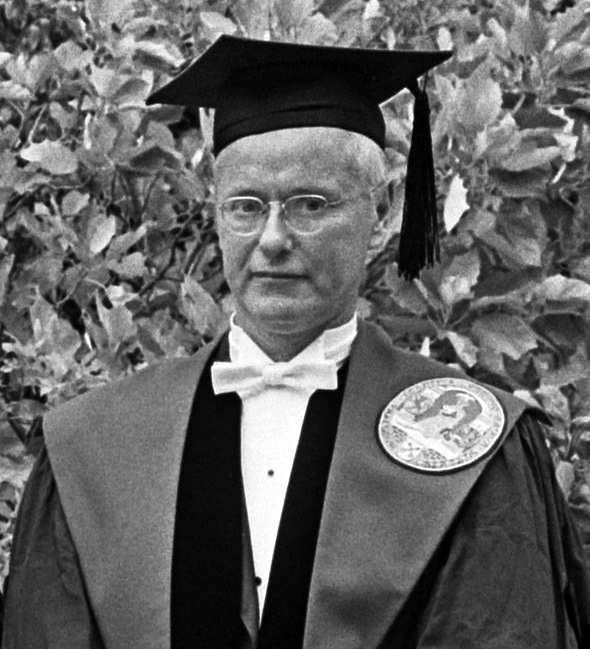
- Merton receiving honorary degree, Leiden University, 1965
- Born: Meyer Robert Schkolnick; July 4, 1910; Philadelphia, Pennsylvania, U.S.
- Died: February 23, 2003 (aged 92); New York City, U.S.
- Known for: Self-fulfilling prophecy; Self-defeating prophecy; Merton's strain theory of deviance; Sociology of Science; Functionalism; Role model; Reference group; Mertonian norms; Merton thesis; Matthew effect
- Spouses: Suzanne Carhart; Harriet Zuckerman
- Children: Vanessa Merton; Robert C. Merton; Stephanie Merton Tombrello
- Awards: Guggenheim Fellowship (1949); Parsons Prize (1980); John Desmond Bernal Prize (1982); National Medal of Science (1994); Cooley-Mead Award (1997)

Academic background
- Education: Temple University (BA); Harvard University (MA, PhD)
- Doctoral advisor: Pitirim Sorokin
- Other advisors: Talcott Parsons, Lawrence Joseph Henderson, George Sarton

Academic work
- Discipline: Sociology
- Institutions: Harvard University; Tulane University; Columbia University
- Doctoral students: Peter Blau; Lewis Coser; Barney Glaser; Alvin Gouldner; Philip Selznick
- Notable students: E. Digby Baltzell; Richard Cloward; Jonathan R. Cole; Stephen Cole; Cynthia Fuchs Epstein; Nathan Glazer; Piotr Sztompka

Robert King Merton (born Meyer Robert Schkolnick; July 4, 1910 – February 23, 2003) was an American sociologist who is considered a founding father of modern sociology, and a major contributor to the subfield of criminology. He served as the 47th president of the American Sociological Association. He spent most of his career teaching at Columbia University, where he attained the rank of University Professor. In 1994 he was awarded the National Medal of Science for his contributions to the field and for having founded the sociology of science. (Note: Synonyms for the term "sociology of science" include "science of science" and the back-formed term "logology". The latter term provides convenient grammatical variants not available with the earlier terms, i.e. "logologist", "to logologize", "logological", and "logologically". "Science of Science Cyberinfrastructure Portal." Indiana University.; Ossowska, Maria, and Stanisław Ossowski. 1982 [1935]. "The Science of Science." Pp. 82–95 Polish Contributions to the Science of Science, edited by B. Walentynowicz. Boston: D. Reidel. ISBN 978-83-01-03607-2. Kasparek, Christopher. 1994. "Prus' 'Pharaoh': the Creation of a Historical Novel." The Polish Review 39(1):45–6. note 3. Zamecki, Stefan. 2012. Komentarze do naukoznawczych poglądów Williama Whewella (1794–1866): studium historyczno-metodologiczne [Commentaries to the Logological Views of William Whewell (1794–1866): A Historical-Methodological Study]. Warsaw: Polish Academy of Sciences. ISBN 978-83-86062-09-6, [English-language] summary, pp. 741–743).)

Merton's contribution to sociology falls into three areas: (1) sociology of science; (2) sociology of crime and deviance; (3) sociological theory. He popularized notable concepts, such as "unintended consequences", the "reference group", and "role strain", but is perhaps best known for the terms "role model" and "self-fulfilling prophecy". The concept of self-fulfilling prophecy, which is a central element in modern sociological, political, and economic theory, is one type of process through which a belief or expectation affects the outcome of a situation or the way a person or group will behave. More specifically, as Merton defined, "the self-fulfilling prophecy is, in the beginning, a false definition of the situation evoking a new behavior, which makes the originally false conception come true".

Merton's term "role model" first appeared in a study on the socialization of medical students at Columbia University. The term grew from the concept of the reference group, the group to which individuals compare themselves but to which they do not necessarily belong. Social roles were central to the theory of social groups. Merton emphasized that, rather than a person assuming just one role and one status, they have a status set in the social structure that has, attached to it, a whole set of expected behaviors.

== Biography ==
=== Early life ===
Robert King Merton was born on July 4, 1910, in Philadelphia as Meyer Robert Schkolnick into a family of Yiddish-speaking Russian Jews who had immigrated to the United States in 1904. His mother was Ida Rasovskaya, an "unsynagogued" socialist who had freethinking radical sympathies. His father was Aaron Schkolnickoff, a tailor who had officially been registered at port of entry to the United States as "Harrie Skolnick". Merton's family lived in strained financial circumstances after his father's uninsured dairy-product shop in South Philadelphia burned down. His father later became a carpenter's assistant to support the family.

Even though Merton grew up fairly poor, he believed that he had been afforded many opportunities. As a student at South Philadelphia High School, he was a frequent visitor to nearby cultural and educational venues, including the Andrew Carnegie Library, the Academy of Music, the Central Library, and the Museum of Arts. In 1994, Merton stated that growing up in South Philadelphia provided young people with "every sort of capital—social capital, cultural capital, human capital, and, above all, what we may call public capital—that is, with every sort of capital except the personally financial."

He adopted the name Robert K. Merton initially as a stage name for his magic performances. Young Merton developed a strong interest in magic, heavily influenced by his sister's boyfriend. For his magic acts he initially chose the stage name "Merlin", but eventually settled on the surname "Merton" to further "Americanize" his immigrant-family name. He picked the given name "Robert" in honor of the 19th-century French magician Jean-Eugène Robert-Houdin, widely considered the father of modern-style conjuring. Thus his stage name became "Robert Merton", and he kept it as his personal name upon receiving a scholarship to Temple University.

=== Education ===
Merton began his sociological career under the guidance of George E. Simpson at Philadelphia's Temple University (1927–1931). Merton's work as Simpson's research assistant on a project dealing with race and media introduced Merton to sociology. Under Simpson's leadership, Merton attended an American Sociological Association annual meeting where he met Pitrim A. Sorokin, the founding chair of the Harvard University sociology department. Merton applied to Harvard and worked from 1931 to 1936 as a research assistant to Sorokin.

By his second year at Harvard he had begun publishing with Sorokin. In 1934 he began publishing articles of his own, including "Recent French Sociology", "The Course of Arabian Intellectual Development, 700–1300 A.D.", "Fluctuations in the Rate of Industrial Invention", and "Science and Military Technique". In 1936 he graduated from Harvard, having obtained an MA and PhD in sociology.

By the end of his student career in 1938 he embarked on works that brought him renown, publishing his first major study, Science, Technology, and Society in Seventeenth-Century England, which helped create the sociology of science. Merton's dissertation committee comprised Sorokin, Talcott Parsons, the historian George Sarton, and the biochemist Lawrence Joseph Henderson. Merton's thesis—similar to Max Weber's famous claim about a link between the Protestant work ethic and the capitalist economy—proposed a positive correlation between the rise of Protestant pietism, Puritanism, and early experimental science.

=== Personal life ===
In 1934 Merton married Suzanne Carhart, with whom he had a son, Robert C. Merton, winner of the 1997 Nobel Prize in economics, and two daughters, Stephanie Merton Tombrello and Vanessa Merton, professor of law at Pace University School of Law. In 1968 Merton and Carhart separated; she died in 1992.

In 1993 Merton married his fellow sociologist and collaborator, Harriet Zuckerman, who had been his companion since the late sixties. After years of failing health, and battling six forms of cancer, Merton died in Manhattan on 23 February 2003, aged 92. He was survived by his wife, three children, nine grandchildren, and nine great-grandchildren.

== Career ==
=== Teaching career ===
Merton taught at Harvard until 1938, when he became professor and chairman of the Department of Sociology at Tulane University. In 1941, he joined the Columbia University faculty, where he spent the vast majority of his teaching career. Over his five decades at Columbia University he held numerous prestigious titles. He was associate director of the university's Bureau of Applied Social Research from 1942 to 1971, and named Giddings Professor of Sociology in 1963. He was also named to the university's highest academic rank, University Professor, in 1974 and became a Special Service Professor, a title reserved by the trustees for emeritus faculty who "render special services to the University", upon his retirement in 1979. He was an adjunct faculty member at Rockefeller University, and was also the first Foundation Scholar at the Russell Sage Foundation. He withdrew from teaching in 1984. In recognition of his lasting contributions to scholarship and the university, Columbia established the Robert K. Merton Professorship in the Social Sciences in 1990.

== Theory ==
Upon moving to Columbia in 1941, Merton joined Paul Lazarsfeld, who was introducing quantitative methods into empirical research in sociology. Lazarsfeld and Merton emphasized the importance of "systematic data", collected in a systematic way through representative sampling. Merton sought to develop a theoretical approach "that would turn the results from this research into sociology."

=== Middle-range theory ===
Merton's work is often compared to that of Talcott Parsons. Merton enrolled in Parsons' theory course while at Harvard, admiring Parsons' work because it introduced him to European methods of theory, while also broadening his own ideas about sociology. However, unlike Parsons, who emphasized the necessity for social science to establish a general foundation, Merton preferred more limited, middle-range theories. Merton later explained in his writings that "although much impressed by Parsons as a master-builder of sociological theory, I found myself departing from his mode of theorizing (as well as his mode of exposition)." Merton himself fashioned his theory very similarly to that of Emile Durkheim's Suicide (1897) or Max Weber's Protestant Ethic and the Spirit of Capitalism (1905). Weber had suggested a strong relationship between Protestant beliefs and the Economic activity that gave rise to capitalism. Merton's extensive research highlighted a complementarity between puritanical Protestant beliefs and science, which developed rapidly in the seventeenth century. Merton believed that middle range theories bypassed the failures of larger theories, which are too distant from observing social behavior in a particular social setting.

According to Merton, middle-range theory starts its theorizing with clearly defined aspects of social phenomena, rather than with broad, abstract entities such as society as a whole. Theories of the middle range should be firmly supported by empirical data. These theories must be constructed with observed data to create theoretical problems and to be incorporated in proposals that allow empirical testing. Middle-range theories, applicable to limited ranges of data, transcend sheer description of social phenomena and fill in the blanks between raw empiricism and grand or all-inclusive theory.

The identification of middle-range theories or "intermediate provisions", as defined by Rinzivillo (2019), is typical of the specification that passes through functional analysis, developed by Merton in the course of his research on the relationship between theory and empirical research. Unlike the functionalist theorisation proposed by Parsons, Merton proposes a choice that puts in particular evidence the relationship that the researcher should assume in the direction of a pragmatic choice of the instruments and methodology it uses. In this way, the theory can be addressed for heuristic purposes and the empirical research results in the operative aspect of the analysis, where the sociologist is obliged to choose to represent always, not the universe of the variables in play, but a reduction of the field of scientific interest. A strategy, in short, in favor of the survey.

=== Anomie and Strain ===
Merton argued that deviance may result as a consequence of a blockage in an individual's life which does not allow them to achieve their goal, essentially leading to deviant behavior. According to Merton's strain theory, criminality is determined by acceptance or rejection of cultural ideals and/or institutionalized mechanisms of accomplishing those goals. The term "strain" refers to the gap between culturally determined goals and the institutionalized tools available to fulfill these goals. Merton uses the progress of achieving the 'American Dream' as an example. If an individual can not achieve the culturally dominant goal (of success), it can prove frustrating for the individual and may lead to breaking free into illegal escape routes or delinquency. The theory has been criticized for not or insufficiently factoring in an individual's aspirations and expectations of achieving those goals. For this reason and others, adherents of strain theory have developed revisions, such as Edwin Sutherland who defined white-collar crime as "a crime committed by a person of respectability and high social status in the course of his occupation".

=== Clarifying functional analysis ===
Merton argues that the central orientation of functionalism is in interpreting data by their consequences for larger structures in which they are implicated. Like Durkheim and Parsons, he analyzes society with reference to whether cultural and social structures are well or badly integrated. Merton is also interested in the persistence of societies and defines functions that make for the adaptation of a given social system. He believed that the way these early functionalists put emphasis on functions of one social structure or institution for another, created bias when focusing only on adaptation or adjustment because they would always have a positive consequence. Finally, Merton thinks that shared values are central in explaining how societies and institutions work; however, he disagrees with Parsons on some issues.

His belief in empirical testing led to the development of his "paradigm" of functional analysis. According to Merton, paradigm refers to:

exemplars of codified basic and often tacit assumptions, problem sets, key concepts, logic of procedure, and selectively accumulated knowledge that guide [theoretical and empirical] inquiry in all scientific fields.

==== Dysfunctions ====
In Merton's writing on dysfunctions, he highlights problems that tend to keep social systems from meeting all of their functional requirements. In doing this, he was able to point out the details as well as the contradictions of the overall concept. One group's function could serve as another group's dysfunction, and a general incident could turn out to be both functional and dysfunctional for the same group. Merton clarified the concept by stating that a certain degree of social cohesion eases the productivity of a group and is therefore functional, but it can become dysfunctional when it surpasses a certain threshold, because then the members of the group may become equally indulgent and fail to hold each other to high performance standards.

Merton elaborates on his three main issues or flaws with functionalism, which he labels postulates:

- the postulate of the functional unity of society;
- the postulate of universal functionalism; and
- the postulate of indispensability.

The postulate of the functional unity of society refers to the misunderstanding that societies are functional and harmonious unions. According to Merton's perception of functionalism, all standardized social and cultural beliefs and practices are functional for both society as a whole as well as individuals in society. This outlook maintains that various parts of social systems must show a high level of integration, but Merton argues that a generalization like this cannot be extended to larger, more complex societies. Merton points out that not all societies are happy and well-integrated, where the people function well together and all involved prosper. Merton cites examples, such as civil wars, African-Americans in the 1950s, and South African blacks during the apartheid regime as instances where societies were not necessarily functional for all people.

The postulate of universal functionalism refers to the idea that all ideals work for everyone in a society. The claim of universal functionalism argues that all standardized social and cultural structures and forms have a positive function. Merton argues that this is a contradiction to what is seen in the real world; not every structure, idea, belief, etc., has positive functions. Merton believes that some things may have consequences that are generally dysfunctional or which are dysfunctional for some and functional for others. For example, poverty may benefit the rich because they are allowed to maintain more of their wealth, but it certainly does not benefit the poor who struggle. On this point he approaches conflict theory, although he does believe that institutions and values can be functional for society as a whole. Merton states that only by recognizing the dysfunctional aspects of institutions, can we explain the development and persistence of alternatives. Merton's concept of dysfunctions is also central to his argument that functionalism is not essentially conservative.

Lastly, the postulate of indispensability refers to the social function for customs, ideals, or institutions as a whole. This postulate states that the standardized parts of society have positive functions, and also represent indispensable parts of the working whole, which implies that structures and functions are functionally necessary for society. Here, Merton argues, people must be willing to admit that there exist various structural and functional alternatives within society. In terms of structural functionalism, Merton felt that the focus should be on social functions rather than on individual motives. He raises the question and doubt of whether every social institution performs a specific function, believing that several institutions can provide the same function or none at all, so it is impossible to decipher what functions are vital or not to a society.

==== Net balance ====
To help people determine whether positive functions outweigh dysfunctions, and vice versa, Merton developed the concept of net balance. Because the issues are complex and based on a lot of subjective judgement, they cannot be calculated and weighed easily. Therefore, positive functions and dysfunctions cannot be simply added up and objectively determine which outweighs the other. To deal with these issues, Merton believed that there must be levels of functional analysis. Rather than solely focusing on the analysis of society as a whole, Merton argued that analysis could and should also be done on an organization, institution or group.

=== Unanticipated consequences and manifest vs latent functions ===
Some of the crucial innovations that Merton made to sociology include the description of the unanticipated consequences of social action, of latent functions vs. manifest functions, and, as previously mentioned, of dysfunctions.

According to Merton, unanticipated consequences are actions that have both intended and unintended consequences. Everyone is aware of the intended consequences, but the unintended are more difficult to recognize, and therefore, sociological analysis is required to uncover what they may be. In his 1936 essay, "The Unanticipated Consequences of Purposive Social Action", Merton uncovered the wide field of human activity where things do not go as planned, and paradoxes and strange outcomes are seen. One of these outcomes is the "self-defeating prophecy", which through the very fact of its being publicized, is actually wrong. Merton was able to illustrate this by referencing Karl Marx's prediction that as societies become more modern, the wealth will be concentrated amongst fewer people, and the majority of society would suffer from poverty and misery. This prediction helped to stimulate the socialist movement, which in some countries slowed the development that Marx had predicted. Struggles for economic equality tend to spread economic benefit rather than concentrating it. The opposite of the "self-defeating prophecy" then, is the "self-fulfilling prophecy", when an originally unfounded prophecy turns out to be correct because it is believed and acted upon.

The distinction implied between manifest and latent functions was devised to preclude the unintentional confusion between conscious motivations for our social behavior and its objective consequences. Manifest functions are the consequences that people observe or expect, or what is intended; latent functions are those that are neither recognized nor intended. In distinguishing between manifest and latent functions, Merton argued that one must dig to discover latent functions. His example from his 1949 piece, "Manifest and Latent Functions", was an analysis of political machines. Manifest and latent functions were devised to prelude the inadvertent confusion between conscious motivations for social behavior and its objective consequences. Merton began by describing the negative consequences of political machines, and then changed the angle and demonstrated how the people in charge of the machines, acting in their own interest, were meeting the social needs not met by government institutions. Merton made it very clear however, that unanticipated consequences and latent functions are not the same. Latent functions are one type of unanticipated consequences; functional for the designated system.

According to Merton, there are also two other types of unanticipated consequences:

1. "Those that are dysfunctional for a designated system," which comprise the latent dysfunctions; and
2. "Those which are irrelevant to the system which they affect neither functionally or dysfunctionally…non-functional consequences."

Merton sees attention to latent functions as increasing the understanding of society: the distinction between manifest and latent forces the sociologist to go beyond the reasons individuals give for their actions or for the existence of customs and institutions; it makes them look for other social consequences that allow these practices' survival and illuminate the way society works.

=== Functional alternatives ===
Functionalists believe societies must have certain characteristics to survive. Merton shares this view but stresses that at the same time particular institutions are not the only ones able to fulfill these functions; a wide range of functional alternatives may be able to perform the same task. This notion of functional alternative is important because it alerts sociologists to the similar functions different institutions may perform and it further reduces the tendency of functionalism to imply approval of the status quo.

=== Theory of deviance ===
Merton's structural-functional idea of deviance and anomie

Merton's theory of deviance stems from his 1938 analysis of the relationship between culture, structure and anomie. Merton argued that deviance is most likely to occur when there is a discrepancy between culturally prescribed goals and the legitimate means of obtaining them. Merton defines culture as an "organized set of normative values governing behavior which is common to members of a designated society or group". Social structures are the "organized set of social relationships in which members of the society or group are variously implicated." Anomie, the state of normlessness, arises when there is "an acute disjunction between the cultural norms and goals and the socially structured capacities of members of the group to act in accord with them."

In his theory, Merton links anomie with deviance and argues that the discontinuity between culture and structure have the dysfunctional consequence of leading to deviance within society. The goal of material success was accepted, but the legitimate means were abandoned in preference for illegitimate ones. So, theft might replace hard work as the means for achieving goals. Merton argued deviance results not from pathological personalities but from the culture and structure of society itself. Value consensus is when all members of society share the same values; however, since members of society are placed in different positions in the social structure, they do not have the same opportunity of realizing the shared values. This can create deviance.

For Merton, the term anomie, derived from Émile Durkheim, means a discord between cultural goals and the legitimate means available to reach them. Applied to the United States, he sees the American Dream as an emphasis on the goal of financial success, but without a corresponding emphasis on the legitimate avenues for achieving the Dream. In other words, Merton believes that the American Dream is a cultural ideal, but the ways in which people go about obtaining it are not the same. This can lead to a considerable amount of deviance (in the Parsonian sense). This theory is commonly used in the study of criminology (specifically in strain theory).

In 1938, Merton's "Social Structure and Anomie", one of the most important works of structural theory in American sociology, Merton's basic assumption was that the individual is not just in a structured system of action but that his or her actions may be forced by the demands of the system. Merton argued that when the economic system fails to provide legitimate means to earn an income, and status, the cultural logic of the social system may force the individual to act in ways that are culturally logical, even if illegal.

Merton's Paradigm of Deviant Behaviour
Attitude to Goals	Attitude to Means	Modes of Adaptation
accept	accept	Conformity
accept	reject	Innovation
reject	accept	Ritualism
reject	reject	Retreatism
reject/accept	reject/accept	Rebellion

In this rubric, conformity refers to the attaining of societal goals by socially accepted means, while innovation refers to the attaining of those goals in unaccepted ways (such as crime and deviance). Innovators find and create their own ways to obtain what they want, and a majority of the time, these new means are considered to be socially unaccepted and deviant. Merton considers ritualism the acceptance of the means but the forfeit of the goals. Ritualists continue to subscribe to the means, but they have rejected the overall goal; they are not viewed as deviant. Retreatism is the rejection of both the means and the goals. Retreaters want to find a way to escape from everything and therefore reject both the goals and the means and are seen as deviant. Rebellion differs from the other four approaches in a number of ways. Temporally, rebellion is a short-term response (unlike the other four). Like retreaters, rebels reject both existing societal goals and means, but unlike retreaters, rebels work at the macro level to replace those existing societal goals and means with new goals and means embodying other values. Innovation and ritualism are the pure cases of anomie as Merton defined it because in both cases there is a contradiction or discontinuity between goals and means.

=== Sociology of science and CUDOS ===
The sociology of science was a field that Merton was very interested in and remained very passionate about throughout his career. Merton was interested in the interactions and importance between social and cultural structures and science. For example, he did pioneering historical research in his PhD dissertation on the role of military institutions in stimulating scientific research during the era of the Scientific Revolution.

Merton carried out extensive research into the sociology of science, developing the Merton Thesis explaining some of the religious causes of the Scientific Revolution, and the Mertonian norms of science, often referred to by the acronym "CUDOS". This is a set of ideals that are dictated by what Merton takes to be the goals and methods of science and to be binding on scientists. They include:

- Communism: the common ownership of scientific discoveries, according to which scientists give up intellectual property in exchange for recognition and esteem.
- Universalism: according to which claims to truth are evaluated in terms of universal or impersonal criteria, and not on the basis of race, class, gender, religion, or nationality;
- Disinterestedness: according to which scientists are rewarded for acting in ways that outwardly appear to be selfless; and
- Organized skepticism: all ideas must be tested and are subject to rigorous, structured community scrutiny.

The "OS" in "CUDOS" is sometimes identified as "Originality" (i.e. novelty in research contributions) and "Skepticism". This is a subsequent modification of Merton's norm set, as he did not refer to Originality in the 1942 essay that introduced the norms, "The Normative Structure of Science".

Merton introduced many concepts to the sociology of science, including: "obliteration by incorporation", referring to when a concept becomes so popularized that its inventor is forgotten; and "multiples", referring to independent similar discoveries.

Merton and his colleagues spent much time studying "how the social system of science works in accordance with, and often also in contradiction to, the ethos of science." This newer focus on the social organization of science led Merton to study the reward system in science, priority disputes between scientists, and the way in which famous scientists often receive disproportionate credit for their contributions, while less-known scientists receive less credit than their contributions merit. Merton called this phenomenon the "Matthew effect". (See also Stigler's law of eponymy.) As a result of the Matilda effect, Harriet Zuckerman is credited by Merton as co-author of the Matthew effect.

With his study of the Matthew effect, Merton showed how the social system of science sometimes deviated structurally from the ethos of science, in this case by violating the norm of universalism: a few top scientists enjoying large chunks of awards, grants and jobs, and the spread and distribution of resources and recognition among scientists being highly skewed.

=== On the Shoulders of Giants ===
Merton referred to his book On the Shoulders of Giants: A Shandean Postscript as "OTSOG"—"part parody and part history of ideas", according to the publisher. In OTSOG, he traces the history of Newton's famous comment "If I have seen farther, it is by standing on the shoulders of giants" back to centuries earlier, in the rambling style of Laurence Sterne's The Life and Opinions of Tristram Shandy, Gentleman.

== Influences ==
Merton was heavily influenced by Talcott Parsons and to a much lesser degree by Pitirim Sorokin. Indeed, Merton's choice of dissertation topic reflect profoundly the interest from Parsons and was not of Sorokin's liking. Hence, Sorokin was strongly opposed to the emphasis of the creativity of Puritanism, which was a central element in Merton's discussion. Merton, however, managed to have both men on his dissertation committee. Merton worked with Sorokin as a graduate student at Harvard University. However, intellectuals like Paul Lazarsfeld influenced Merton to occupy himself with middle-range theories. Yet Merton's general theoretical perspectives were much closer to Parsons than Sorokin. He was also influenced by Lawrence Joseph (L.J.) Henderson, who taught him something about the disciplined investigation of what is first entertained as an interesting idea. E.F. Gay also played a role in Merton's thought, as did the famous historian of science George Sarton, who allowed Merton to work with him at Harvard and is believed to have inspired Merton to have interest in science. Émile Durkheim and Georg Simmel also greatly contributed to Merton's understanding of sociology and to his own ideas.

== Legacy ==
Merton is viewed as one of the founding fathers of modern-day sociology. His works are seen as the driving force of many sociologists' studies. Merton's friends and colleagues credit his guidance to the positive direction of modern sociology as well. In particular, Columbia provost Jonathan R. Cole who studied under Merton praised him shortly after his death, saying:

Bob Merton became the leader of structural-functional analysis in sociology, and the leader of those sociologists who attempted to create social theories that could be empirically tested. He was an inspirational teacher and editor, and with his students, such as James S. Coleman and Seymour Martin Lipset, among many others who would become leading figures in the field, he helped to build and legitimate the field of sociology in America. For me, he was a model teacher and mentor, a trusted colleague, and a close friend. His death, in many ways, puts a period at the end of 20th-century sociology.

Through his theory and research during his many decades as a sociologist, Merton essentially created and sustained what is the modern sociology of science.

== Accolades ==
Over his career, Merton published some 50 papers in the sociology of science. Among many other fields and topics to which he contributed his ideas and theories were deviance theory, Organization theory, and middle-range theory.

Merton received many national and international honors for his research. He was one of the first sociologists elected to the National Academy of Sciences, and the first American sociologist to be elected a foreign member of the Royal Swedish Academy of Sciences, foreign member of the Polish Academy of Sciences, and a Corresponding Fellow of the British Academy. He was also a member of the American Philosophical Society, the American Academy of Arts and Sciences, which awarded him its Parsons Prize, the National Academy of Education, and Academica Europaea. Merton is also credited as the creator of the focus group research method.

He received a Guggenheim Fellowship in 1962 and was the first sociologist to be named a MacArthur Fellow (1983–1988). More than twenty universities awarded him honorary degrees, including: Harvard, Yale, Columbia, and Chicago University in the US; and, abroad, the Universities of Leiden, Wales, Oslo, Kraków, Oxford, and the Hebrew University of Jerusalem.

In 1994 Merton became the first sociologist to be awarded the US National Medal of Science, for "founding the sociology of science and for his pioneering contributions to the study of social life, especially the self-fulfilling prophecy and the unintended consequences of social action."

The Robert K. Merton Award for the best paper in analytical sociology, has been awarded annually by the International Network of Analytical Sociology since 2013.

The Robert K. Merton Prize is awarded by the American Sociological Association.

== Publications ==
- 1938. "Science, Technology and Society in Seventeenth Century England." Osiris 4(2):360–632.
  - This publication made Merton well known among historians of science. It was strongly influenced by Boris Hessen's famous 1931 Marxist account, The Socio-economic Roots of Newton's Principia, which he defended in a paper "Science and the Economy of Seventeenth Century England". However, Merton also supplemented Hessen's analysis of the technological determinants of the fields of inquiry of seventeenth-century science with a study of the influence of religion (especially Protestantism) on the social legitimacy of science as a profession: the so-called "Merton Thesis". He also supported Hessen's arguments by revealing how military problems influenced the research agendas of the Royal Society.
- 1938. "Social Structure and Anomie." American Sociological Review 3:672–82.
- 1942. "The Normative Structure of Science"
- 1949. Social Theory and Social Structure (revised and expanded in 1957 and 1968)
- 1965. On the Shoulders of Giants: A Shandean Postscript
- 1973. The Sociology of Science
- 1976. Sociological Ambivalence
- 1979. The Sociology of Science: An Episodic Memoir
- 1985. "George Sarton: Episodic Recollections by an Unruly Apprentice." Isis 76(4):470–86.
- 1996. On Social Structure and Science, edited by Piotr Sztompka
- 2004. The Travels and Adventures of Serendipity: A Study in Sociological Semantics and the Sociology of Science

== See also ==
- Historic recurrence
- Narcotizing dysfunction
- Role set
- Sociology of scientific knowledge
