= Piotr Sztompka =

Polish sociologist (born 1944)

- Born: 2 March 1944 (age 82); Warsaw, Poland
- Education: Jagiellonian University
- Awards: Prize of the Foundation for Polish Science (2006)
- Scientific career
- Fields: Sociological theory, Visual sociology, Sociology of everyday life

Piotr Sztompka (born 2 March 1944) is a Polish sociologist known for his work on the theory of social trust. He is professor of sociology at the Jagiellonian University in Kraków, Poland, and has also frequently served as visiting professor at the University of California, Los Angeles, and at Columbia University in New York City.

From 2002 to 2006 he was the 15th president of the International Sociological Association.

== Life ==
Sztompka studied law and sociology at the Jagiellonian University in Kraków, Poland, obtaining a Ph.D. degree there in 1970.

Two years later, he was awarded a Fulbright scholarship to the University of California, Berkeley. Since 1974 he has been on the faculty of its Sociology Department, as a teaching assistant and subsequently as a professor.

In the 1970s, Sztompka established a close collaboration with Robert K. Merton, which greatly influenced Sztompka's view of the discipline.

Sztompka has also taught as visiting professor at Columbia University, the University of Michigan, Johns Hopkins University, the University of Rome, and Tischner European University. He is a fellow of the Collegium Invisibile. Sztompka has held multiple residential fellowships (Spring 1990, Spring 1992, Spring 2015) at the Swedish Collegium for Advanced Study in Uppsala, Sweden.

In November 2007 he received Kraków Book of the Month Award for the book Zaufanie: fundament społeczeństwa.

== Contributions ==
Sztompka's principal sociological interests include the social phenomenon of trust, social change, and, recently, visual sociology.

== Works ==
- System and Function (Studies in Anthropology, 1974).
- Sociological Dilemmas (1979).
- Robert K. Merton: an Intellectual Profile (1986)
- The New Technological Challenge and Socialist Societies (editor, 1987).
- Rethinking Progress (with Jeffrey C. Alexander, 1990).
- Society in Action: the Theory of Social Becoming (1991).
- Sociology in Europe: in Search of Identity (with Birgitta Nedelmann, 1993).
- The Sociology of Social Change (1993).
- Agency and Structure: Reorienting Social Theory (International Studies in Global Change, vol. 4; editor, 1994).
- Robert K. Merton, On Social Structure and Science (editor), Chicago, University of Chicago Press, 1996, ISBN 0-226-52070-6.
- Trust: a Sociological Theory (1999).

== See also ==
- Polish sociology
