= Kyle Bass =

American hedge fund manager

- Born: Miami, Florida
- Education: Texas Christian University (B.B.A.)

J. Kyle Bass is an American investor and founder of Conservation Equity Management, a private equity firm focused on environmental sustainability. He is also the founder and principal of Hayman Capital Management, L.P., a Dallas-based hedge fund focused on global events.

In 2008, Bass successfully predicted and effectively bet against the U.S. subprime mortgage crisis by purchasing credit default swaps on subprime securities, which, in turn, increased in value when the real estate bubble burst.

As a manager of the Coalition for Affordable Drugs (CFAD), Bass challenged the validity of 28 pharmaceutical corporations' patents via inter partes review, claiming that he wanted to invalidate weak patents imposing costs on consumers, thus making drugs covered by those patents more affordable. The drug companies targeted by Bass allege that the sole purpose of the validity challenges was to allow Bass to short the market, thereby profiting from the change in companies' stock prices. However, at least one event study indicates that if Bass had in fact pursued such a strategy, he could not have profited, because his "petitions for inter partes review ... did not consistently produce statistically significant negative returns in the patent holders' share prices." The drug patent challenge campaign fizzled after several legal setbacks.

Bass was the recipient of the 2019 Foreign Policy Association Medal for his responsible internationalism. Bass is a lifetime member of the Council on Foreign Relations and a founding member of the Committee on the Present Danger (China).

He is on the advisory board of the China Center at the Hudson Institute, executive advisory board of the George W. Bush Presidential Center, and the investment advisory board member to NewEdge Wealth.

Bass is also a boardmember of the Texas Department of Public Safety Foundation, the Texas Wildlife Association Foundation (TWAF), and The Quad Fund.

On June 14, 2020, the Wall Street Journal reported that Bass is facing regulatory scrutiny from SEC investigators for potential market manipulation—an issue that appears to stem from a controversial trade, executed in late-2015, in which Bass' fund built a short position against the stock price of a publicly traded REIT, United Development Funding (UDF), then accused the REIT of being a Ponzi scheme. The REIT executives were convicted and sentenced to a combined 20 years in federal prison.

== Early life and education ==
Bass graduated from Lamar High School in Arlington, Texas. His father, Charles Bass, was a career tourism executive who managed the Fontainebleau Miami Beach Hotel and the Dallas Convention and Visitors Bureau. Bass attended Texas Christian University on an academic and Division I diving scholarship, and was a member of Kappa Sigma fraternity at the university from 1989 to 1991. He graduated with honors in 1992, earning a B.B.A. in finance with a concentration in real estate.

Bass worked as a stockbroker in the Dallas office of Bear Stearns in the 1990s. He identified stocks that appeared to be overvalued or fraudulent from East German shipyards to Texas mortgage lenders. Once he had enough to launch his fund, he started making bets against subprime mortgages.

== Career ==
Before founding Hayman Capital Management in 2005, Bass briefly worked at Prudential Securities from 1992 to 1994 before joining Bear Stearns in 1994. At Bear Stearns, he rose through the ranks rapidly, becoming a senior managing director at the age of 28 – among the youngest in the firm's history to carry such a title.

In 2001, he joined Legg Mason, signing a five-year deal to form the firm's first institutional equity office in Texas. There, he advised hedge funds and other institutional clients on special situation investment strategies.

In December 2005, when Legg Mason sold the portion of the business where he worked, Bass left Legg Mason and started Hayman Capital Management to serve as the investment manager to a "global special situations" hedge fund that he planned to launch. Bass launched Hayman Capital Management, L.P., with $33 million in assets under management – $5 million he had saved on his own and the balance he had raised from outside investors.

In 2007, Bass testified as an expert witness before the U.S. House Financial Services Subcommittee on Capital Markets and Government-Sponsored Enterprises. During his testimony, he addressed: i) the role of credit rating agencies in the structured finance market and ii) policy measures that could be taken to minimize inherent conflicts of interest between rating agencies and issuers.

In 2010, Bass testified before the Financial Crisis Inquiry Commission. During his testimony, he addressed his analysis of the factors that caused the crisis.

From August 2010 to May 2019, Bass was a member of the Board of Directors of the University of Texas/Texas A&M Investment Management Company (UTIMCO), an endowment fund for Texas public universities.

== Fund performance ==
The flagship fund had a successful year in 2007 and gained 212% based on the subprime mortgage meltdown bet that brought fame to Bass. The fund also gained 16% in 2012 based on Greek debt bets. The long-term performance of Hayman Captal's flagship fund is described by the New York Post as "small caliber." From 2008 to mid-2015, the flagship fund experienced a modest annualized performance of 1.56%. Apart from predicting the housing bust in 2007, Kyle called Greece's economic woes and the devaluation of the Japanese yen a few years later. He later profited from the call that the Japanese yen would fall with a projected round of monetary stimulus by the Bank of Japan.

Bass' first Asia-focused fund was the Japan Macro Opportunities Fund. This fund returned capital to investors after the Japanese yen depreciated 40% from 2012 to 2015. In 2016, he had a knockout with Hayman Capital's Master Fund finishing the year with an estimated net performance of 24.83%. Since Hayman's inception in 2006, the fund has returned 436.75% and an annualized return of 16.7%. Between 2006 and the start of 2017, Hayman delivered an annual return of 16.5% over 11 years. By contrast, the stock market returned 9.4% a year during the same period.

According to investors, his hedge fund has averaged after-fee returns of 25 per cent a year since 2006. He earned a return of more than 500 percent shorting the subprime mortgage market in 2007 and profited from a wager against Greek bonds. Bass has also predicted Greece's economic woes and the devaluation of the Japanese yen.

Bass called 2015 one of his fund's worst years. By early 2019, Hayman had $423.6 million in discretionary assets under management, down from $2.3 billion at the end of 2014.

== Investment positions ==
=== Subprime mortgages ===
Bass first began formulating his subprime strategy after he met with an investment banker from New York while attending a wedding in Spain. They discussed how and why the Subprime Mezzanine CDO business existed. After returning to the US, Bass hired several private investigators to determine the ease of obtaining a mortgage. Bass spent a significant amount of time studying the residential mortgage market and performed research to identify which residential mortgage backed securities (RMBS) composed of low-quality mortgages were most likely to default. This investment thesis was expressed by purchasing credit default swaps against the securitizations he deemed to be most unstable, which essentially was a manner of shorting the bonds using synthetic instruments. After purchasing the positions for his flagship fund in 2006, Bass raised additional capital for a special fund dedicated exclusively to capitalizing on the opportunity that existed in the market place. Bass managed or advised over $4 billion of positions in subprime RMBS.

In December 2007, after a wave of foreclosures had swept across the US, Bass was featured on Bloomberg TV as making a fortune betting against these subprime securities. By forecasting the mortgage market crash, he parlayed $110 million into $700 million alongside his two Subprime Credit Strategies Funds.

=== Europe and Japanese debt "doomsday" ===
After the subprime debt crisis occurred, Bass decided that it was the symptom of a more significant problem with debt and made predictions about debt "doomsday" in Europe and Japan. In 2009 he warned about the possibility of defaults by major countries over the next 3 years. As of 2010, 10-15% of his portfolio was involved in bets against European and Japanese sovereign debts. He went as far as predicting that 2012 would be a "doomsday year" for Europe and spoke of a looming breakup of the Eurozone, which, he declared, would lead to defaults in Japan and the United States. He stated in June 2012, "Europe goes first, then Japan and finally the United States."

Since 2012, Bass has also predicted a "full blown crisis" in Japan describing its approach to financing debt as a Ponzi scheme similar to Bernie Madoff's investment scam. Though many experts have disagreed with his analysis. Renren, Inc., a Chinese company headquartered in the Chaoyang District, Beijing, China invested $80 million in Hayman's Japan Macro Opportunities Offshore Partners, LP, a Cayman Islands exempted limited partnership, between November 2011 and January 2014. Renren reported that it received capital distributions of $84.0 million and $69.1 million in the years ended December 31, 2014 and 2015, respectively, and disposed of the investment on August 24, 2015. RenRen's investment in Bass’ Japan fund was meant to be beneficial that it represented the overwhelming majority of the public company's profits for the 2-year period and therefore had to be disclosed to the SEC as ‘material’ profits.

The Chinese company's investment in Hayman's Japan Macro Opportunities Offshore Partners, LP, required Renren to include the Japan Macro Opportunities Master Fund, LP, audited financials with its Form 20-F filed with the United States Securities & Exchange Commission. The Chinese company included the financials of Hayman's Japan Macro Offshore Partner, LP, as Renren “can exercise significant influence, but not control…”

Cullen Roche criticized Bass's Japan analysis in August 2010, noting that Bass comparing Japan to the EU was an error since their monetary systems are wildly different. Roche stated, "people still fail to understand that a nation with monetary sovereignty that is the supplier of currency in a floating exchange rate system never has a problem funding itself." In May 2012, Business Insider agreed, faulting Bass's analysis, since debt-to-GDP ratios do not reflect the interest rate or credit risk of a nation. The Business Insider noted that in a nation that borrows its own currency, public spending finances borrowing. However, Bass reported in his 2016 Investor Letter, that the Japan Macro Opportunities Fund performed well, stating "Our first Asia-focused fund, the Japan Macro Opportunities Fund, successfully returned capital to investors after the Japanese yen had depreciated approximately 40% from 2012-2015."

Bass has been vocal about future calamities stemming from financial meltdown in public appearances. September 14, 2011, Bass maintained on CNBC that Greece's only way out of its debt mess was a restructuring. Bass noted that despite the strife it would bring to Greece, it was the only measure the nation could take. He added that within a year, all of Europe would be in default as well. In a speech reported on January 1, 2014, he assured the audience of his confidence that the next few years would be rife with turmoil, including the eruption of major wars. In his speech, he claimed that with the growing debt and inability to pay it off, eventually, social unrest will lead to violent outbreaks. Bass finished his speech by stating, "War is coming – just as it has throughout history."

=== General Motors ===
In April 2014, Bass was among the few defenders of General Motors for failing to address a defect tied to 13 deaths. He said, “GM is taking the right steps to invest properly in the crisis.” Hayman, at the time, owned eight million shares of GM, making it Hayman's single biggest holding. Coming to the defense of GM, Bass said on CNBC that of the 13 passengers who had died owing to the defect, 12 "either weren’t wearing their seat belt or were under the influence of alcohol."

=== Chinese banking collapse ===
Starting in July 2015, Bass made a multiyear bet against the Chinese yuan based on a predicted banking collapse in China. Bass closed out his position against the Chinese currency in early 2019 when the predicted devaluation of the currency did not occur.

Bass argued in 2015 that the Chinese banking system was undercapitalized and its foreign reserves would be insufficient in a crisis. Bass predicted a hard landing for the Chinese economy following a bank crisis and a severe devaluation of the Chinese currency, variously given as "somewhere between 15%–20%" and "30 to 40 percent."

Hayman suffered its worst year in 2017, with a loss of 19% due to the strengthening of the Chinese yuan. Bass thinks any trade deal with China must include enforcement mechanisms against intellectual property theft for the U.S. to benefit from it truly. He argued that China signed a special memorandum of understanding in 2013 that companies don't have to do audits or be Dodd-Frank compliant. He is against banning or delisting Chinese companies, but he does support them having to meet the same regulations as U.S. companies. While serving on the Board of UTIMCO in 2018, Bass helped create a set of guidelines compelling its external managers to divest from companies with ties to entities sanctioned by the United States.

=== Argentina ===
The BBC described Bass as having a "good relationship" with Argentina's President Cristina Fernandez de Kirchner as of 2014. In February 2014, Bass said that Argentine bonds represented a profitable opportunity and called Argentina an "interesting" nation for investments. He and other groups of investors sued BNY Mellon for failure in distributing interest on Argentine debt. The IB Times noted that the country had "cheated creditors seven times since it gained independence from Spain in 1816," most recently defaulting on its debt in 1989.

When the Argentine government defaulted on its debt in July 2014, Bass supported the move and criticized the bondholders, notably Elliott Management and Aurelius Capital that, with the support of U.S. federal judge Thomas Griesa, had held out for full payment. Echoing Argentine President Cristina Fernandez de Kirchner, he called these creditors "vultures," said that they were "holding up 42 million people from progress" and were holding Argentina for "ransom." On August 27, 2014, Bass accused Elliott's Paul Singer of "holding poor countries as hostages," prompting The New York Post to comment in an editorial the next day that Bass had "sounded more like Argentina's leftist economy minister Axel Kicillof than a US hedge-fund manager." Bass' Dallas-based fund, Hayman Capital Management LP, bought Argentina's international bond at 55 cents on the dollar after prices dropped on concern the country would default. Bass said, "the bonds have since rallied to 73 cents today" in a Bloomberg Television interview with Stephanie Ruhle.

== Drug patent challenge campaign ==
Bass has attempted to profit from filing and publicizing patent challenges against dubious patents held by big pharmaceutical companies while also betting against their shares. In 2014, Renren, Inc., a Chinese company headquartered in the Chaoyang District, Beijing, China invested $30 million in Bass' pharmaceutical strategy through Hayman Credes Offshore Fund, LP, registered as a Cayman Islands exempted limited partnership and claiming Hayman Offshore Management as its General Partner. Renren reported Hayman Credes Offshore Fund, LP in its SEC filings from 2014 through April 2016 as a principal component of the company's "long-term investments" portfolio.

Through its investment in Hayman Credes Offshore Fund, LP, the Chinese company appears to have participated in Bass' challenges of numerous U.S. drug patents reportedly aimed at driving down the price of U.S. drug company stocks.

In its form, 20-F, filed with the Securities and Exchange Commission for its fiscal year, which ended December 31, 2016, Renren Inc. reported, "In December 2014, the Company invested $30,000 in Hayman, which is a Cayman Islands exempted limited partnership and served as a limited partner. The Company recognized its share of loss of $322 and $157 for the years ended December 31, 2015 and 2016, respectively. From February to April 2016, the Company withdrew all of its investment in Hayman and received total proceeds of $29,521." After 2 years of setbacks in his effort, Bass by 2017 ended his patent challenges.

In 2015, Bass organized the Coalition For Affordable Drugs (CFAD) to challenge patent validity through the Inter partes review (IPR) process. When he initiated this practice in January 2015, he claimed that his motive was to encourage competition in the manufacture of pharmaceuticals and thus bring down prices.

Bass filed a total of 35 patent challenges in collaboration with Erich Spangenberg. The latter has been called “the world's most notorious patent troll”, including 33 filed by CFAD and two filed by Bass personally on a not-for-profit basis. Bass and Spangenberg state the coalition aims to bring down drug prices that are kept artificially high through dubious patents.

In June 2015, Celgene received permission from the U.S. Patent and Trademark Office to file a motion seeking sanctions against the CFAD for allegedly abusing the patent-review process. The Wall Street Journal noted that this development was “being closely watched because it raises the possibility that patent officials may put an end” to Bass's patent-challenge scheme. Through counsel, Celgene also told the patent office that CFAD had threatened to challenge its patents unless Celgene met CFAD's demands.

In October 2016, Bass prevailed in the case, with USPTO invalidating the two Celgene Corp patents related to its cancer drugs Revlimid, Pomalyst, and Thalomid at issue. However, Celgene convinced the Patent Trial and Appeal Board to re-hear the case one year later.

== Politics ==
=== Trump administration ===
A ProPublica story describes Bass as a friend of Tommy Hicks Jr., a private investor who was a hunting buddy to Donald Trump Jr. and had further ties to the Trump administration. According to the investigative story on improper links between Hicks and the Trump administration, Hicks had obtained a meeting with Bass with high-level officials at an inter-agency meeting at the Treasury Department to air views on China. This meeting was when Bass held a large short position in the Chinese currency.

=== China ===
On February 8, 2020, Bass had a Twitter disagreement with Hu Xijin; editor of Chinese newspaper Global Times. He tweeted that the "Chinese virus," a reference to SARS-CoV-2, should "rampage through the ranks of the GT and the rest of the communist party." Hu Xijin's editor-in-chief said he had an "anti-human tendency" and ordinary CCP members "are ordinary citizens, fathers, husbands, wives, daughters." Bass later deleted the tweet but doubled down when Hu suggested he apologize.

“I will not,” Bass replied. “You arrested, censured, and ‘punished’ (only God knows what you did to him and the other 7 doctors) the heroes of Wuhan. You are a disgrace to humanity.” Bass went on to say “The good people of China have lost trust in the CCP. Barricading people into their own homes, arresting the hero doctors of Wuhan, then ordering the rank and file back to work on Monday? It looks like trust in govt (and even fear of govt) has been lost. @HuXijin_GT #revolt”

Bass is a staunch rhetorical critic of the Chinese Communist Party (CCP) and its policies. Bass, in July, 2021, blasted companies in the United States that speak out against social injustices in the United States yet fail to take a strong stance on human rights violations in China. Bass chastised Nike CEO John Donahoe in particular for remarks made during the company's results call with Wall Street analysts. It is difficult, according to Bass, to strike a balance between keeping in President Xi Jinping's good graces economically while becoming more active on societal concerns in the United States. As U.S. corporations will not stop seeking "the pot of gold" that is access to China's economy, Washington policymakers must demonstrate "leadership" in the face of Beijing's human rights transgressions, according to Bass.

Financial reports filed with the Securities Exchange Commission show that in 2016, he accepted investment capital in two of his investment funds from at least one technology company headquartered in China.
