= Akeel Bilgrami =

Indian philosopher of language, mind, and politics (born 1950)

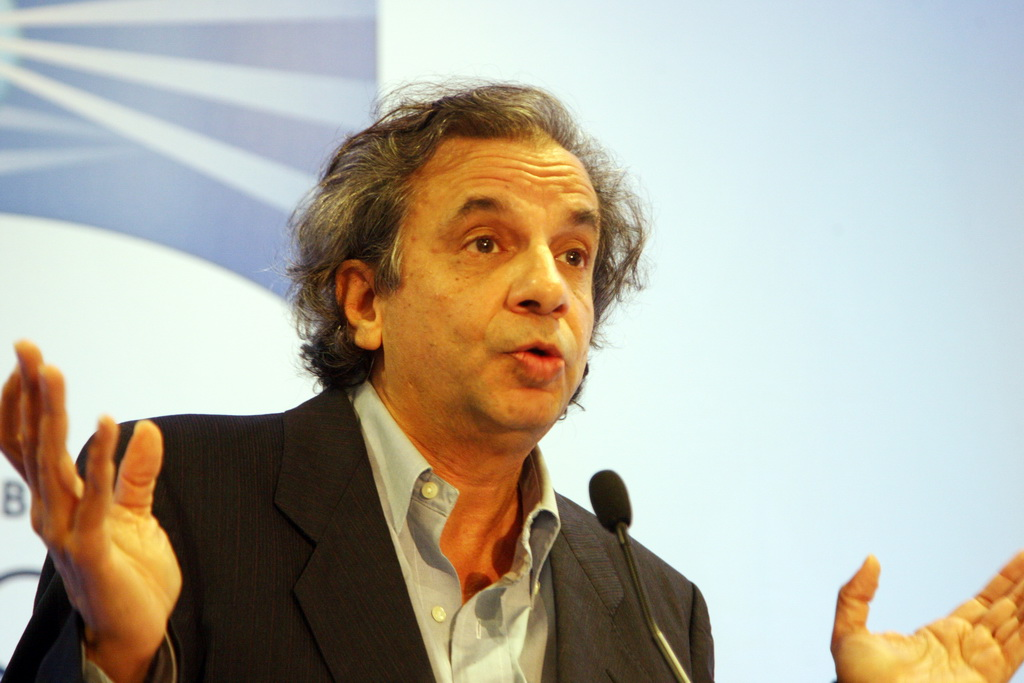
- Born: 28 February 1950 (age 76); India

Education
- Education: University of Mumbai (BA); University of Oxford (BA); University of Chicago (PhD)

Philosophical work
- Era: Contemporary philosophy
- Region: Western philosophy
- School: Analytic philosophy
- Main interests: Philosophy of the mind, Philosophy of language, Secularism, Political philosophy

Akeel Bilgrami (born 28 February 1950) is an Indian philosopher. He has been in the Department of Philosophy at Columbia University since 1985 after spending two years as an assistant professor at the University of Michigan, Ann Arbor.

Bilgrami is a secularist and an atheist who advocates an understanding of the community-oriented dimension of religion. For Bilgrami, spiritual yearnings are not only understandable but also supremely human. He has argued in many essays that in our modern world, "religion is not primarily a matter of belief and doctrine but about the sense of community and shared values it provides in contexts where other forms of solidarity—such as a strong labor movement—are missing." He has been on the Humanities jury for the Infosys Prize from 2012, serving as Jury Chair from 2019.

== Selected publications ==
- Belief and Meaning (Blackwell, 1992)
- Self-Knowledge and Resentment (Harvard University Press, 2006)
- Secularism, Identity, and Enchantment (Harvard University Press, 2014)
- Nature and Value (Columbia University Press, 2019)
- Politics and The Moral Psychology of Identity (Harvard University Press, forthcoming)
