= Patent Trial and Appeal Board =

The Patent Trial and Appeal Board (PTAB) is an administrative law body of the United States Patent and Trademark Office (USPTO) which decides issues of patentability. It was formed on September 16, 2012, as one part of the America Invents Act. Prior to its formation, the main judicial body in the USPTO was the Board of Patent Appeals and Interferences (BPAI).

== Structure ==
The PTAB is primarily made up of an Appeals Division and a Trial Division. The Appeals Division, with over 100 Administrative Patent Judges, handles appeals of patent examiner rejections, with sections adjudicating different technology areas. The Trial Division, handles contested cases such as inter partes review, post-grant review, the Transitional Program for Covered Business Method Patents, and derivation proceedings.

The PTAB is headed by Acting Chief Administrative Patent Judge Kalyan K. Deshpande.

== Procedures ==
An applicant can appeal the examiner's decision to the PTAB. The appeal procedure is described in section 1200 of the U.S. Manual of Patent Examining Procedure (MPEP).

Typically, appeals to the PTAB are conducted ex parte. Decisions of the PTAB are typically rendered as an opinion.

== Appeals ==
Decisions of the PTAB can be further appealed to the United States Court of Appeals for the Federal Circuit (CAFC) under 35 U.S.C. § 141(a). The decisions of the CAFC may also be reviewed on a discretionary basis by the United States Supreme Court as was firmly established in 1966 in Brenner v. Manson. Under United States v. Arthrex, Inc., the USPTO Director also has authority to review decisions of the Board and even issue decisions in its name.

An alternative path is a civil action against the Director of the United States Patent and Trademark Office in the U.S. District Court for the Eastern District of Virginia under 35 U.S.C. § 145. Any appeal arising from such a case would then be directed to the CAFC under 28 U.S.C. § 1295.

The United States Congress, however, can change the patent laws, and thus override a precedential decision of the Supreme Court, but only for future cases and not retrospectively.

== Constitutionality ==
In 2007, Professor John F. Duffy, a law professor, argued that, since 2000, the process of appointing judges to the BPAI (the PTAB's predecessor court) has been unconstitutional, because the judges were appointed by the Director of the U.S. Patent and Trademark Office rather than by the Secretary of Commerce (a "Head of Department" under the Appointments clause of the Constitution). This problem has since been rectified and current Administrative Patent Judges are appointed by the Secretary of Commerce.

Starting in 2014, parties challenged the constitutionality of the PTAB to review and cancel patent claims under the Seventh Amendment and separation of powers doctrines. The Supreme Court decided in the 2018 Oil States case that this function of the PTAB was constitutional.

=== Claim construction standards ===
In January 2016, the United States Supreme Court agreed to hear a challenge to the legitimacy of the patent standards used in the Patent Trial and Appeal Board during inter partes review. In the case, Petitioner Cuozzo Speed Technologies, LLC, argued that the PTAB's use of the "Broadest Reasonable Interpretation" (BRI) claim construction standard exceeded their authority, and that Congress had legislated that they follow the "Phillips" claim construction standard used in other U.S. Courts. On June 20, 2016, the Supreme Court issued their opinion, upholding the PTAB's BRI claim construction standard. In response, in May 2018, the USPTO proposed adopting the Phillips claim construction.

=== Principal Officers versus Inferior Officers ===
On October 31, 2019, a three judge panel of the United States Court of Appeals for the Federal Circuit held that the administrative patent judges (APJs) were Principal Officers of the United States due to the construction of the statute creating their offices. The panel further held that the members of the Board were unconstitutionally appointed under the Appointments Clause, which would require appointment through the President and confirmation by the Senate. They rectified the situation by severing the portion of the statute that restricted removal of the members of the Board, thus rendering them Inferior Officers of the United States.

Upon appeal, the Supreme Court of the United States issued its decision on June 21, 2021, that affirmed that APJs were considered principal officers with "unreviewable authority", and thus had been appointed unconstitutionally. However, to remedy the matter, the Court made it so that all decisions made by the PTAB were subject to review by the Director of the Patent Office, who was an appointed position.

== See also ==
- Appeal procedure before the European Patent Office
- Trademark Trial and Appeal Board (TTAB)
