= Recuperation (politics) =

Process by which radical ideas become mainstream

In the sociological sense, recuperation is the process by which politically radical ideas and images are twisted, co-opted, absorbed, defused, incorporated, annexed or commodified within media culture and bourgeois society, and thus become interpreted through a neutralized, innocuous or more socially conventional perspective. More broadly, it may refer to the cultural appropriation of any subversive symbols or ideas by mainstream culture.

The concept of recuperation was formulated by members of the Situationist International, its first published instance in 1960. The term conveys a negative connotation because recuperation generally bears the intentional consequence (whether perceived or not) of fundamentally altering the meaning behind radical ideas due to their appropriation or being co-opted into the dominant discourse. It was originally conceived as the opposite of their concept of détournement, in which images and other cultural artifacts are appropriated from mainstream sources and repurposed with radical intentions.

== Examples ==
Some former means of countercultural expression that have been identified by critics as recuperated (at least in part) are punk music and fashion like mohawk hairdos, ripped jeans, and bondage accessories like dog collars; tattoos; street art and participatory art.

Environmental justice proponents who center social movements and resistance in the transformation to environmental sustainability see the language of transitions to sustainability being recuperated by those seeking to delay and manage the transition.

Pointing to "the erosion of publicly owned media" and capitalist realism, Aaron Bastani wrote of the "recuperation of the internet by capital" and says that the consequences of this persistent corporate media recuperation included a reinforcement of status quo, repression of dissent and artistic expression.

Social justice advocates have identified the popular discourse of The New Jim Crow as recuperative, saying that it obscures an analysis of mass incarceration in the United States by adhering to a counterrevolutionary contextual framework.

The popular conception of Martin Luther King Jr. has also been recuperated, with his democratic socialist ideas such as wealth redistribution and guaranteed jobs being largely scrubbed from America's cultural memory.

== See also ==
- Avant-garde
- Censorship
- Controversy
- Embrace, extend and extinguish
- Fourth branch of government
- Harold Rosenberg
- Obliteration by incorporation
- Unitary urbanism
