= Mertonian norms =

Philosophical ideals for the practice of science

In 1942, Robert K. Merton described four aspects of science that later came to be known as Mertonian norms: "four sets of institutional imperatives taken to comprise the ethos of modern science... communism, universalism, disinterestedness, and organized skepticism". The subsequent portion of his book, The Sociology of Science, elaborated on these principles at "the heart of the Mertonian paradigm—the powerful juxtaposition of the normative structure of science with its institutionally distinctive reward system".

== Description and motivation ==
Merton defines this 'ethos' with reference to Albert Bayet's 1931 work La Morale de la Science, which "abandons description and analysis for homily" as "that affectively toned complex of values and norms which is held to be binding on the man of science". He attempted to clarify it, given that previously it had not been 'codified'; Merton uses Bayet's remark that 'this scientific ethos [morale] does not have its theoreticians, but it has its artisans. It does not express its ideals, but serves them: it is implicated in the very existence of science'.

The norms are expressed in the form of prescriptions, proscriptions, preferences, and permissions. They are legitimatized in terms of institutional values. These imperatives, transmitted by precept and example and reenforced by sanctions are in varying degrees internalized by the scientist, thus fashioning his scientific conscience or, if one prefers the latter-day phrase, his super-ego… [This scientific ethos] can be inferred from the moral consensus of scientists as expressed in use and wont, in countless writings on the scientific spirit and in moral indignation directed toward contraventions of the ethos.

An examination of the ethos of modern science is only a limited introduction to a larger problem: the comparative study of the institutional structure of science. Although detailed monographs assembling the needed comparative materials are few and scattered, they provide some basis for the provisional assumption that "science is afforded opportunity for development in a democratic order which is integrated with the ethos of science." This is not to say that the pursuit of science is confined to democracies.

His attempt at 'codification' sought to determine which social structure[s] "provide an institutional context for the fullest measure of [scientific] development", i.e. lead to scientific achievement rather than only "potentialities". He saw these "institutional imperatives (mores)" as being derived from the [institutional] "goal of science" ("the extension of certified knowledge") and "technical methods employed [to] provide the relevant definition of knowledge: empirically confirmed and logically consistent statements of regularities (which are, in effect, predictions)".

The entire structure of technical and moral norms implements the final objective. The technical norm of empirical evidence, adequate and reliable, is a prerequisite for sustained true prediction; the technical norm of logical consistency, a prerequisite for systematic and valid prediction. The mores of science possess a methodologic rationale but they are binding, not only because they are procedurally efficient, but because they are believed right and good. They are moral as well as technical prescriptions.

== Four Mertonian norms ==
The four Mertonian norms (often abbreviated as the CUDO-norms) can be summarised as:

- communism: all scientists should have common ownership of scientific goods (intellectual property), to promote collective collaboration; secrecy is the opposite of this norm.
- universalism: scientific validity is independent of the sociopolitical status/personal attributes of its participants.
- disinterestedness: scientific institutions act for the benefit of a common scientific enterprise, rather than for specific outcomes or the resulting personal gain of individuals within them.
- organized skepticism: scientific claims should be exposed to critical scrutiny before being accepted: both in methodology and institutional codes of conduct.

=== Communism (communality) ===
Communism in science requires a strong opposition to the commodification of scientific research to serve capitalistic interests. Instead, it advocates for commonly owned scientific knowledge. Common ownership of scientific goods is integral to science: "a scientists' claim to 'his' intellectual 'property' is limited to that of recognition and esteem".

The substantive findings of science are a product of social collaboration and are assigned to the community. They are a common heritage in which the equity of the individual producer is severely limited... rather than exclusive ownership of the discoverer and their heirs.

Communism is used sometimes in quotation marks, yet elsewhere scientific products are described without them as communized. Merton states the "communism of the scientific ethos" is flatly incompatible with "the definition of technology as 'private property' in a capitalistic economy", noting the claimed right of an inventor to withhold information from the public as demonstrated in the case of the U.S. v. American Bell Telephone Co.

A corollary to the need for common ownership of scientific knowledge is the imperative for "full and open" communication, which he saw in J. D. Bernal's 1939 book The Social Function of Science, as opposed to secrecy, which he saw espoused in the work of Henry Cavendish, "selfish and anti-social".

=== Universalism ===
The two aspects of Merton's universalism are expressed in the statements that "objectivity precludes particularism" and "free access to scientific pursuits is a functional imperative".

Firstly, all scientists' claims ("truth-claims") should be subjected to the same "pre-established impersonal criteria" regardless of their source ("personal or social attributes of their protagonist"), i.e. regardless of race, nationality, culture, or gender. He saw universalism as "rooted deep in the impersonal character of science", and yet also saw the institution of science itself as part of a larger social structure which, paradoxically, was "not always integrated" into the societal structure. This could cause friction and be detrimental to the scientific project:

Particularly in times of international conflict, when the dominant definition of the situation is such as to emphasize national loyalties, the man of science is subjected to conflicting imperatives of scientific universalism and ethnocentric particularism.

Secondly, to restrict scientific careers for any reason other than incompetence was to "prejudice the furtherance of knowledge". Merton again noted how the ethos of science may be inconsistent with that of society, but insists that "however inadequately it may be put into practice, the ethos of democracy includes universalism as a dominant guiding principle". He predicted that this inadequacy of laissez-faire democratic processes would lead ultimately to false differential accumulation and increasing regulation of science under political authority, which must be counteracted through "new technical forms of organization" towards equality of opportunity.

=== Disinterestedness ===
Distinct from altruism, scientists should act for the benefit of a common scientific enterprise rather than for specific outcomes. Merton reasoned that an individual's scientific motivation may be easily influenced and without institutional enforcement of disinterestedness, and the "seeming virtual absence of fraud" could not be explained by unusually high moral integrity of individuals alone.

Merton observed a low rate of fraud in science ("virtual absence … which appears exceptional"), which he believed stemmed from the intrinsic need for "verifiability" in science and expert scrutiny by peers ("rigorous policing, to a degree perhaps unparalleled in any other field of activity") as well as the "public and testable character" of science.

Self-interest (in the form of self-aggrandisement and/or exploitation of "the credulity, ignorance, and dependence of the layman") is the logical opposite of disinterestedness and may be appropriated by authority "for interested purposes." Merton points to "totalitarian spokesmen on race or economy or history" as examples and describes science as enabling such "new mysticisms" that "borrow prestige."

=== Organized skepticism ===
Skepticism (i.e. "temporary suspension of judgement", and 'detached' critical scrutiny) is central to both scientific methodology and institutions.

== Later variants ==
Later work has added "originality", and shortened 'organized scepticism' to 'scepticism', producing the acronym 'CUDOS' (sometimes these 5 concepts are misleadingly named 'Mertonian norms'). Other works additionally replace 'communism' with 'communalism' (e.g. Ziman 2000) or 'Communality' (e.g. Anderson et al., 2010).

=== Counter norms ===
Ian Mitroff, in a study of the Apollo moon scientists, provided evidence for the influence of what he called "counternorms". These counter norms are a one to one opposition of Mertonian norms.

- Communality (originally called communism) is countered by "Secrecy": "Scientists protect their newest findings to ensure priority in publishing, patenting, or applications."
- Universalism is countered by "Particularism": "Scientists assess new knowledge and its applications based on the reputation and past productivity of the individual or research group."
- Disinterestedness is countered by "Self-interestedness": "Scientists compete with others in the same field for funding and recognition of their achievements."
- Organized skepticism is countered by "Organized dogmatism": "Scientists invest their careers in promoting their own most important findings, theories, or innovations."

== See also ==
- Open science data
- Philosophy of science
- Research § Research ethics
- Scientific consensus
- Scientific method
