= United States v. American Bell Telephone Co. =

United States of America v. American Bell Telephone Company
- Supreme Court of the United States

Argued November 9–11, 1896 Decided May 10, 1897
- Full case name: United States of America v. American Bell Telephone Company and Emile Berliner
- Citations: 167 U.S. 224 (more) 17 S. Ct. 809; 42 L. Ed. 144; 1897 U.S. LEXIS 2097

Case history
- Prior: 65 F. 86 (C.C.D. Mass. 1894); reversed, 68 F. 542 (1st Cir. 1895).

Court membership
- Chief Justice Melville Fuller Associate Justices Stephen J. Field · John M. Harlan; Horace Gray · David J. Brewer; Henry B. Brown · George Shiras Jr. Edward D. White · Rufus W. Peckham

Case opinions
- Majority: Brewer
- Dissent: Harlan
- Gray and Brown took no part in the consideration or decision of the case.

United States v. Bell Telephone Co., 167 U.S. 224 (1897), is an 1897 decision of the United States Supreme Court that held that the United States lacked standing to challenge the validity of its issued patents “on the mere ground of error of judgment” in issuing them. The United States had standing to seek to invalidate patents, however, on grounds of fraudulent procurement and also as a defense to a charge of patent infringement. The decision operated for many decades as a bar to government efforts to seek invalidation of patents that it considered spurious until the Supreme Court limited Bell Telephone, first to a limited extent in United States v. United States Gypsum Co., and then more broadly in United States v. Glaxo Group Ltd.

== Background ==
On February 1, 1893, the United States filed in the Circuit Court of the United States for the District of Massachusetts a bill in equity against the American Bell Telephone Company and Emile Berliner, praying a decree to set aside and cancel U.S. patent No. 463,569, issued on November 17, 1891, to Bell as assignee of the inventor Berliner. According to the opinion in the case:

The application by Berliner was made on June 4, 1877, he having filed a caveat on April 14, 1877. In 1878, and prior to October 23, the telephone company purchased Berliner's invention, and on November 17, 1891, a patent was issued to the telephone company, as assignee of Berliner. The application was therefore pending in the department fourteen years, during thirteen of which the invention was the property of the telephone company.

The government made two allegations on which the circuit court passed:

1. Bell delayed the patent application in the patent office for thirteen years. That was, under the circumstances alleged in the bill, unlawful and fraudulent. According to the government, this enabled Bell to enjoy a monopoly on the telephone because of Alexander Graham Bell's patent, and then when it expired an additional monopoly under Berliner's, thus prolonging the period of monopoly over the telephone. "So that, while the public has today, by reason of the expiration of the Bell patent, the right to use as it pleases his invention, such right is a barren one, and the telephone monopoly is practically extended to the termination of the Berliner patent, and this extension of the time of the monopoly has been accomplished by means of the delay in the issue of the Berliner patent—the long pendency of the application in the Patent Office."

2. Bell received two patents, one in 1880 and another in 1891, upon a division of the original application. Both patents cover the same invention so that Bell got two patents on the same invention, one of which expires eleven years after the other one. The patent commissioner did not have legal power to issue more than one patent on one invention.

Upon amended pleadings and proofs, the circuit court on January 3, 1895, 65 F. 86, entered a decree as prayed for in favor of the United States. On appeal to the Court of Appeals for the First Circuit, this decree was on May 18, 1895, reversed, and a decree entered directing a dismissal of the bill. 68 F. 542. Thereupon the United States took an appeal to the Supreme Court.

== Ruling of the Supreme Court ==
The Court's majority opinion, by Justice Brewer, began by noting that this was the first case by the United States "to set aside a patent for an invention as wrongfully issued." There were prior cases as to land patents, however, and the Court looked to them for guidance. These cases required "clear, convincing, and unambiguous" evidence from the government to overcome "the presumption that all the preceding steps required by the law had been observed before its issue, [given] the immense importance and necessity of the stability of titles dependent upon these official instruments."

Applying this principle to the government's first argument, the Court asked what caused the thirteen years of delay—"It may have been caused either by the negligent or wrongful action of the officers of the department, and without any connivance, assistance, or concurrence on the part of the applicant, or it may have been brought about by the applicant, either through its corruption of the public officers or through other misconduct on its part." The Court said that the burden was on the government to prove bribery or other misconduct to cause delay, and no evidence of that was in the record. The government's only evidence was of "the supine submission of the company to such extraordinary delay." The Court said that the patent officials could have acted more expeditiously, but there is no evidence that "they acted wrongfully, and [that] their action was induced by or at the instance of the defendants." Therefore, the government's first argument failed.

As for the second argument—double patenting—the Court said the patent office had made a determination on that point that "was adverse to the [present] contention of the government, and such judgment cannot be reviewed in this suit." The reason was the government lacked standing to litigate that issue:

[W]hen it has no proprietary or pecuniary result in the setting aside of the patent, is not seeking to discharge its obligations to the public, when it has brought the suit simply to help an individual, making itself, as it were, the instrument by which the right of that individual against the patentee can be established—then it becomes subject to the rules governing like suits between private litigants.

To be sure: "Doubtless the removal from the public of the burden of a monopoly charged to have been wrongfully created was also one of the objects, and perhaps the principal object." But the patent law gives the patent office exclusive power to determine whether to issue a patent. "[T]he argument is a forcible one that such determination[s] should be held conclusive upon the government." The United States may sue to cancel a patent procured by fraud, but this is not such a case. "Least of all was it intended . . . that the courts of the United States, sitting as courts of equity, could entertain jurisdiction of a suit by the United States to set aside a patent for an invention on the mere ground of error of judgment on the part of the patent officials."

Justice Harlan dissented without opinion.

== Later developments ==
In United States v. United States Gypsum Co., the Supreme Court recognized that Bell Telephone held that the United States was "without standing to bring a suit in equity to cancel a patent on the ground of invalidity," but went on to declare that, to vindicate the public interest in enjoining violations of the Sherman Act, the United States is entitled to attack the validity of patents relied upon to justify anticompetitive conduct otherwise violative of the law. Specifically, if a patentee defended price-fixing on the ground that it was permissible under the 1926 General Electric case, the government could overcome that defense by showing the patent was invalid.

In United States v. Glaxo Group Ltd., the government showed that the defendants used their patent power to secure restrictive patent licenses that violated the antitrust laws. Then, the government sought a declaration that the patents were invalid and as relief compulsory licensing of the patents and mandatory sales of the patented product, on reasonable terms. The district court refused the relief, accepting the defendants' arguments that the government would "deny defendants an essential ingredient of their rights under the patent system," and that there was no warrant for "such a drastic forfeiture of their rights." The district court cited Bell Telephone as authority for the government's lack of standing to challenge patent validity. The Supreme Court reversed. Whether the patents were valid or invalid could significantly affect what remedies were appropriate. It held:

In this context, where the court would necessarily be dealing with the future enforceability of the patents, we think it would have been appropriate, if it appeared that the Government's claims for further relief were substantial, for the court to have also entertained the Government's challenge to the validity of those patents.
