= Peter Hedström (sociologist) =

Swedish sociologist

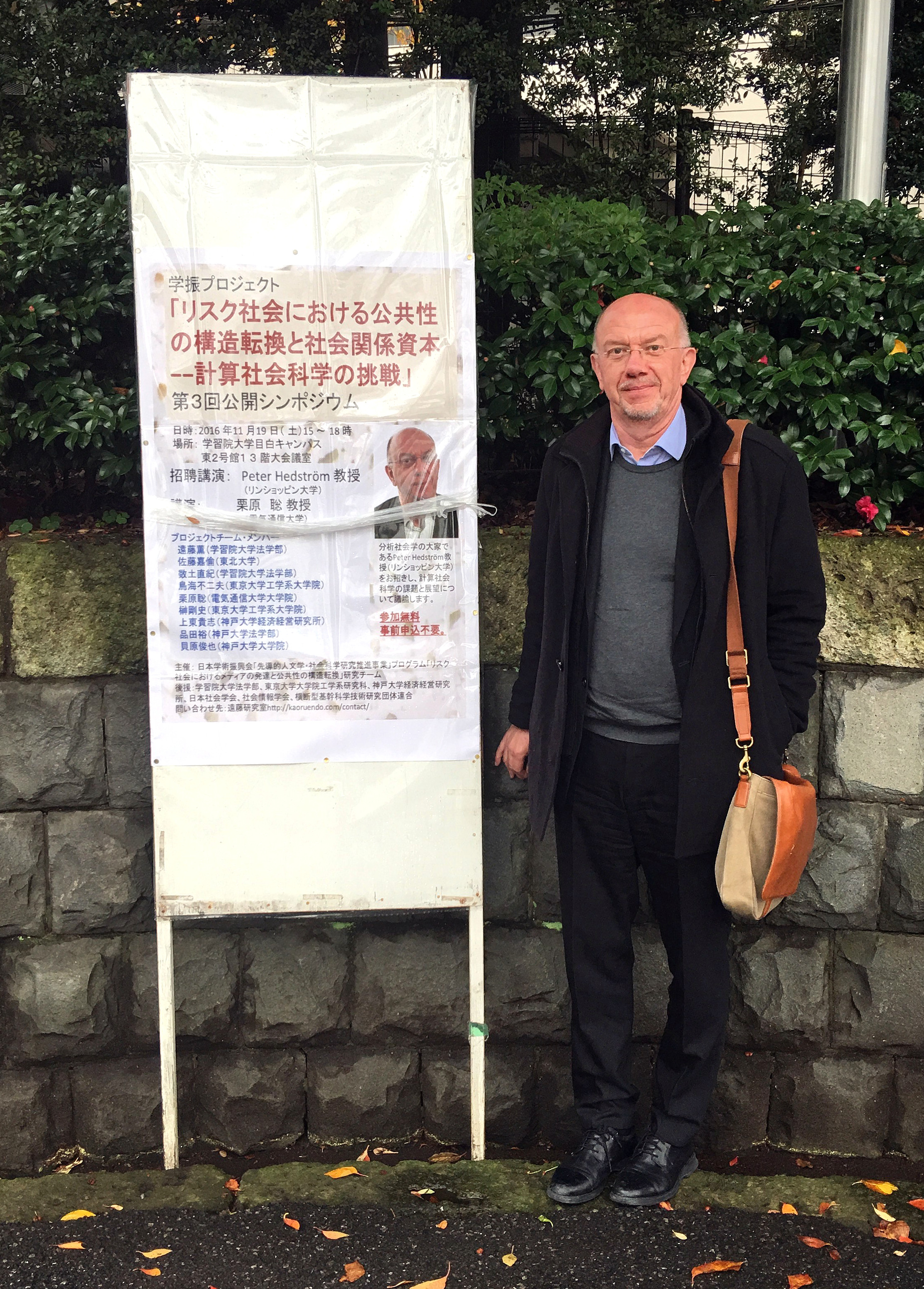
Peter Hedström in Tokyo, 2016

Peter Hedström (born 14 July 1955 in Norsjö, Sweden) is one of the founders of the field of analytical sociology. He has made contributions to the analysis of social contagion processes and complex social networks, as well as to the philosophical and meta-theoretical foundations of analytical sociology. He is one of the key contributors to the literature on social mechanisms.

Hedström received his Ph.D. at Harvard University in 1987. He then took a post as assistant professor at the University of Chicago, and, in 1989, he received a professor chair at the Department of Sociology, Stockholm University. In 2003, he assumed a position as Official Fellow and professor at Nuffield College, University of Oxford, which he left in 2011 to become the director of the Institute for Futures Studies in Stockholm. During the 2008/2009 he was dean of the School of Social Sciences at the Singapore Management University. Together with Peter Bearman, Hedström edited the foundational Oxford Handbook of Analytical Sociology published in 2009. In 2014, Hedström started the Institute for Analytical Sociology at Linköping University. Hedström is past president of the Swedish Sociological Association and has served as editor of Acta Sociologica and as associate editor of the American Journal of Sociology, Annual Review of Sociology, and Rationality and Society. He is the president of the International Network of Analytical Sociology, past president of the European Academy of Sociology, and a Fellow of the Royal Swedish Academy of Sciences, the Royal Swedish Academy of Letters, History and Antiquities, the Norwegian Academy of Science and Letters and the Academia Europaea. Hedström has been a Fellow at the Swedish Collegium for Advanced Study in Uppsala multiple times.

== Key publications ==
- P. Hedström and Richard Swedberg (eds.) Social Mechanisms: An Analytical Approach to Social Theory. Cambridge: Cambridge University Press, 1998.
- P. Hedström Dissecting the Social: On the Principles of Analytical Sociology. Cambridge University Press, 2005.
- P. Hedström and Peter Bearman (Eds.) The Oxford Handbook of Analytical Sociology. Oxford: Oxford University Press, 2009.
- P Hedström Causal mechanisms in the social sciences (with Petri Ylikoski). Annual Review of Sociology 36: 49–67.
