= Patexia =

Patexia, Inc.
- Type: Private
- Industry: Intellectual property
- Founded: 2010
- Headquarters: Santa Monica, California, U.S.
- Key people: Pedram Sameni (Founder, CEO)
- Products: Patent research, Information crowdsourcing, Analytical tools, Employment listings, Networking
- Number of employees: 10 to 50
- Website: Patexia.com

Patexia Inc. is a privately held intellectual property (IP) company based in Santa Monica, California, U.S. The company was founded in 2010 with the mission to enhance transparency and efficiency in the IP field through a leveraging of the knowledge of an IP-based online community of researchers, attorneys, and stakeholders—described by the company as a "multidisciplinary social network"—for the purpose of information crowdsourcing. In addition, the company combines patent and litigation databases to provide analytical tools regarding the IP field, including the details of attorneys, law firms, companies, and examiners, for its community members.

In March 2015, company founder and CEO Pedram Sameni claimed that client feedback formed the basis of a "track record … of 75 percent of cases" regarding successful relevant-prior-art searches.

As of November 2016, Patexia is officially partnered with the U.S. Department of Health and Human Services (HHS), Yahoo, Inc., and NASA. In June 2015, the company was awarded one of 10 new NASA Open Innovation Service (NOIS) Contracts regarding "human space exploration challenges."

== History ==
The company was founded in 2010 by Sameni, whose aim was to address the inefficiency that he observed in the IP field while working in a management role at the IP and licensing department of U.S. power-management-technology company International Rectifier (now part of Infineon Technologies). Sameni explained to the Legal NewsLine publication in December 2014 that the considerable IP portfolio he was responsible for at International Rectifier revealed major issues regarding the conventional patent processes including the immense backlog "burden" of the United States Patent and Trademark Office (USPTO), which Pedram states was left with more than 600,000 outstanding patent applications at the end of Fiscal Year 2014.

Sameni eventually identified crowdsourcing as a viable alternative to traditional prior art search, as "the most relevant prior art references are [most-often] hidden in non-patent-literature or foreign language documents;" that is, given that the compulsory research of each prior-art application is performed by an individual examiner in the U.S., the employment of a research community means that multi-lingual searches can be conducted by tens of thousands of individuals with access to global publications, thereby resulting in a significant efficiency and quality improvement. In December 2014, Sameni explained:

A global crowd of thousands or millions is not bound by the restrictions that apply to an individual or even a single company. If you pose a question to the crowd, they can respond with knowledge across many industries and search for responses in dozens of languages. The crowd takes a variety of creative approaches not bound by a single set of cultural or educational norms, which leads to emergent behavior and new and innovative solutions … patterns often emerge that may otherwise have been overlooked at the individual level.

In March 2011, Patexia released the beta version of its first research tool, the "IP Research" platform, to the public. Described by the blog of international patent-search business Landon IP (now part of CPA Global) as a "free patent search system with simple visual analysis tools," the Patexia press release explained that the platform "covers [the] U.S. patent database from 1976 to late 2010, which includes over 4.1M patents." In early 2011, the official Patexia blog was also commenced.

In May 2012, the first-ever Patexia crowdsourcing contest was launched. Participants were required to submit "a new or existing idea that reduces health care costs," and two US$1,000 prizes were offered. One of the winners was determined by Patexia judges, while a popular vote was used for the other winner.

At the start of 2013, Patexia was identified by Bloomberg News, alongside other crowdsourced IP firms like Article One Partners (bigger in size than Patexia itself), for its potential in the patent-litigation area, as a PricewaterhouseCoopers U.S. study indicated that the number of filed patent actions had tripled between 1991 and 2011. Regarding litigation matters, Sameni stated in 2014: "Crowdsourcing is an extremely efficient way to search for evidence of use and locate infringing products across different markets."

In March 2015, the "Patexia.Defend" program was launched with respect to the patent-litigation area. Again, crowdsourcing underpins the program that was developed to help reduce the monetary costs for technology-sector clients facing a high number of patent-litigation cases. During the launch, active membership programs were offered in terms of the semiconductor sub-sectors such as Wireless connectivity, flash memory, and DRAM.

NASA published its press release regarding the awarding of 10 new NOIS contracts—the total combined value of which is $20 million over five years—in mid-2015, with Patexia listed among the recipients alongside other companies including InnoCentive, Inc. and HeroX PBC. The press release for the NASA Tournament Lab explained that the new contracts would initially be used to seek new algorithms for its Robonaut project for both space and Earth purposes, while NASA’s "evolvable Journey to Mars strategy" is the future research subject. NASA’s director of the Center of Excellence for Collaborative Innovation stated that the space organization wanted to exploit "the global nature of the internet to tap into the diverse intellects and talents available around the world."

Patexia’s activities regarding patent litigation were further developed with the launch of the "Patexia Coalition Funding Initiative" in September 2015. The Initiative’s aim is the reduction of expensive litigation costs through collective action that heightens efficiency, whereby "companies share the burdens they would otherwise face alone." By forming a "defense coalition," Sameni explained that individual companies would only be liable for costs around the $50,000 mark, rather than the millions of dollars that can be incurred otherwise.

=== Contest ===
The studies that Patexia engages in comprise the patent due diligence regarding litigation and licensing cases. To initiate the search process, contests, which are either private or public, are promoted by the company as "crowdsourced challenges" on its "Contest" Web page, as well as via an email list and an RSS feed. The details of the challenge, including the scoring criteria and the rules, are provided in the announcement.

Contest submissions are scored on a 100-point scale and according to the grading rubric that is included with the contest details. The highest-scoring submission is deemed the "winner," and 60 percent of the overall prize pool is awarded. The contest rewards always vary, with $5,000 awarded to the winner of a "Tire Pressure Monitoring System" contest in October 2016.

=== Community ===
Patexia-community members can use the "Community" platform to share news items, analyses/opinions, and IP reviews for which a specific intellectual asset is examined in detail. Patexia has linked the IP-review section to its patent database to show the "real value" of intellectual assets.

=== Research ===
Patexia hosts its searchable databases and visualization tools regarding U.S. patents, U.S.-patent lawsuits, industry trends, company portfolios, and the details of patent professionals in its "Research" section. The visualization tool allows users to analyze the information, including the performance of a comparative analysis.

=== Connect ===
The "Connect" section of the Patexia website provides a "marketplace" for IP-employment opportunities in the legal and consultancy areas, with the openings including those for litigation associates, patent agents, and technical consultants.

== Innovation ==
In addition to the promotion of efficiency, the "driving" of innovation has also been listed as an aim of Patexia, and Sameni has revealed his views on the progression of the IP field through the media. Regarding crowdsourcing, he said to Legal NewsLine in December 2014 that it can "help with [the] creative idea generation process" and can "serve as the foundation of future patents and innovation within an industry."

Also in December 2014, he proposed an "initial opt-in" program to improve the efficiency of the USPTO, whereby "crowdsourced prior art research" would be merged with the organization’s patent-application process. Sameni cited the Pareto Principle, which suggests "80 percent of outcomes are the result of 20 percent of causes," explaining: "Essentially, we [Patexia] recommend that the USPTO apply crowdsourcing to ‘the 20 percent’ of patent applications thus increasing efficiency overall, rather than applying crowdsourcing to every application under review."

Semani was invited to sit on a November 2014 USPTO roundtable discussion regarding the use of crowdsourcing for the identification of the relevant prior art for patent applications. The USPTO announcement stated that "crowdsourcing may be a promising way to uncover hard-to-find prior art, especially non-patent literature."

In March 2015, Sameni explained the importance of crowdsourcing in patent litigation to the InsideCounsel publication: "At the root of all of the recent controversy and debate, the real issue with the United States patent system is patent quality. If each patent was trusted to be an unimpeachable asset it would remove many of the reasons behind the high litigation rates we see today."

== See also ==
- List of crowdsourcing projects
- Public participation in patent examination
- Internet as a source of prior art
