= Patent opposition proceedings =

Patent opposition proceedings are administrative mechanisms within the patent law framework that allow third parties to formally challenge the validity of a pending patent application (pre-grant opposition) or a granted patent (post-grant opposition). These opposition proceedings serve as a crucial check within the patent system, ensuring that patents are granted only for inventions that genuinely meet all legal requirements, thereby maintaining the integrity and quality of the patent landscape.

== Types of opposition systems ==
There are primarily two types of patent opposition systems, each with distinct procedures and strategic implications:

=== Pre-grant opposition ===
Pre-grant opposition allows third parties to oppose a patent application before the patent is officially granted. This system provides an opportunity to prevent the issuance of a patent that may not satisfy the patentability criteria. Pre-grant opposition proceedings typically commence after the patent application has been published but before the substantive examination is completed by patent examiners. In some jurisdictions, the opposition period starts after a positive examination result, where the patent office indicates an intention to grant the patent.

Procedures: An opponent must file a notice of opposition within a specified time frame, stating the grounds for opposition and providing supporting evidence. The patent applicant is notified and given the opportunity to respond, amend the application, or provide counterarguments. The patent office then reviews the submissions from both parties before making a decision.

=== Post-grant opposition ===
Post-grant opposition permits third parties to challenge the validity of a patent after it has been granted. This system is crucial for correcting any oversight that may have occurred during the examination process. The opposition must be filed within a specific period after the patent grant, commonly ranging from six to twelve months, depending on the jurisdiction.

Procedures: Similar to pre-grant opposition, the opponent submits a notice outlining the grounds for opposition with supporting evidence. The patentee is notified and can respond or amend the patent claims. The patent office evaluates the arguments and evidence presented by both parties to determine whether the patent should be maintained, amended, or revoked.

== Rationale and objectives ==
The opposition system is integral to the patent framework for several reasons:

- Quality assurance: It enhances the quality and reliability of granted patents by providing a mechanism to weed out patents that should not have been granted due to non-compliance with legal requirements such as novelty, inventive step, and industrial applicability.
- Resource optimization: By involving third parties—often competitors with deep knowledge of the relevant technology—the patent office benefits from additional insights and prior art that may not have been uncovered during the initial examination.
- Public interest protection: Opposition proceedings help safeguard the public domain by ensuring that exclusive rights are not granted for inventions that do not merit patent protection, thus preventing undue restrictions on access to technology and knowledge.
- Legal certainty: They provide an early resolution to potential disputes over patent validity, reducing the likelihood of costly litigation and enhancing confidence among patent holders and third parties.

== Procedural aspects and variations ==
While the fundamental purpose of opposition systems is consistent, their implementation can vary significantly across jurisdictions:

- Timeframes for filing opposition: The period during which an opposition can be filed may commence immediately after the publication of the patent application, after a positive examination result, or following the grant of the patent. The duration of this period varies, typically ranging from two to six months for pre-grant oppositions and six to twelve months for post-grant oppositions.
- Eligibility to oppose: In many countries, any person or legal entity can file an opposition. Some jurisdictions, however, may restrict the right to oppose to third parties only, excluding the applicant or patentee.
- Grounds for opposition: Common grounds include lack of novelty, inventive step, or industrial applicability; insufficient disclosure; and inclusion of subject matter extending beyond the content of the original application. Some laws also allow opposition based on non-compliance with formal requirements or issues related to entitlement.
- Anonymity of opponents: Certain jurisdictions permit opponents to remain anonymous or to file oppositions through intermediaries (strawmen), which can be important for maintaining business relationships and preventing retaliation.
- Procedural formalities: The requirements for filing an opposition, such as the need for a written statement, evidence submission, and adherence to formal procedures, differ among countries. Some systems are highly formalized, while others are more flexible.
- Decision-making bodies: Opposition proceedings may be conducted by the same examiners who handle patent applications, specialized opposition boards, or panels comprising technical and legal experts. The composition of these bodies can influence the proceedings' thoroughness and impartiality.
- Fees and costs: Most jurisdictions require the payment of an opposition fee, which is generally lower than the cost of court litigation. However, opponents may incur additional expenses for legal representation and gathering evidence.

== Advantages of opposition proceedings ==
Opposition proceedings offer several benefits over judicial revocation processes:

- Accessibility and efficiency: As administrative procedures, they are typically more accessible and faster than court actions, reducing the time and resources needed to resolve disputes over patent validity.
- Technical expertise: Decisions are often made by individuals with specialized knowledge in the relevant technical fields, potentially leading to more informed and accurate outcomes.
- Flexibility in patent amendment: Patent applicants or patentees have opportunities to amend claims during opposition proceedings, which can preserve valuable patent rights while addressing the issues raised.
- Minimized adversarial impact: The less confrontational nature of administrative proceedings may help maintain professional relationships between parties who might be competitors or collaborators in other contexts.

== Challenges and considerations ==
Implementing an effective opposition system involves balancing several factors:

- Resource allocation: Patent offices need sufficient resources, including skilled personnel and administrative infrastructure, to manage opposition proceedings efficiently without causing undue delays in patent granting processes.
- Impact on patent enforcement: During the opposition period, the enforceability of the patent may be uncertain, which can affect licensing agreements, investments, and market entry strategies.
- International harmonization: Differences in opposition systems across jurisdictions can create complexities for applicants seeking patent protection in multiple countries, necessitating careful navigation of varying procedures and deadlines.

== Related mechanisms ==
In addition to opposition proceedings, several other mechanisms enable third parties to influence the patent granting process or challenge patents:

- Third-party observations: Individuals or entities can submit observations on the patentability of an invention during the examination phase, providing relevant prior art or arguments without becoming parties to formal proceedings.
- Re-examination procedures: Post-grant administrative processes where the patent office re-evaluates the validity of a patent, often initiated by a third party or the patentee, sometimes without the adversarial format of opposition proceedings.
- Administrative revocation or invalidation: Procedures allowing for the annulment of a patent outside the standard opposition period, typically involving administrative bodies or courts with the authority to revoke patents based on certain grounds.
- Judicial proceedings: Generally, patents can also be challenged in a court. This most commonly occurs as a defense in a patent infringement proceedings but in many jurisdictions it may also be possible to directly attack the validity of a patent via a judicial process in a stand-alone action.

== Patent opposition in countries ==
Each country may have its own reasons to introduce opposition procedures, or not to introduce such procedures, under its national law. Among the countries that have an opposition system, procedural and substantive requirements have some common aspects, but are different in details. Such differences may include: pre-grant or post-grant opposition, entitlement to file an opposition, period for filing an opposition, grounds for an opposition etc.

=== European Patent Office ===
In the context of the proceedings at the European Patent Office (EPO), any person other than the patent proprietor may challenge the validity of a granted European patent by filing a post-grant opposition under the European Patent Convention (EPC). The term for filing an opposition with the EPO is nine months from the publication of the mention of the grant of the European patent in the European Patent Bulletin.

=== France ===
Opposition proceedings may be filed against French patents granted since April 1, 2020. The term for filing an opposition with the National Institute of Industrial Property (INPI) is nine months from the grant of the French patent. An opposition may be filed by a strawman.

=== United States ===
Under United States patent law, an opposition proceeding is called a reexamination. Post-grant review provisions of the new patent law may affect a potential patent infringement defendant's strategies in filing a declaratory judgment action. Subsequent to the Leahy–Smith America Invents Act (2011), any third party can challenge the validity of an issued patent using either post-grant review under 35 U.S.C. § 321 or inter partes review under 35 U.S.C. § 311. Both proceedings became effective September 16, 2012.

== See also ==
- Patent watch
- Office action
- Search report
- Public participation in patent examination (including a discussion on the possibility, in some jurisdictions, for third parties to file observations during the examination of a patent application, see sub-section "Observations by third parties")

== Sources ==
This article incorporates text from a free content work. Licensed under CC-BY-4.0. Text taken from Opposition Systems, WIPO.
