= Citizen sourcing =

Crowdsourcing to improve government operations

Citizen sourcing is the government adoption of crowdsourcing techniques for the purposes of (1) enlisting citizens in the design and execution of government services and (2) tapping into the citizenry's collective intelligence for solutions and situational awareness. Applications of citizen sourcing include:

- The use of ideation tools by government agencies to collect ideas and suggestions from the public
- The use of problem-solving tools that allow citizens to identify and evaluate solutions to problems proposed
- The adoption of citizen reporting platforms, such as for crime or emergency response information
- The government monitoring of social media, such as Twitter, for situational awareness, such as with regard to natural disasters

Citizen sourcing has gained prominence as part of the Obama administration's Open Government Initiative and is seen, in the words of Vivek Kundra, as a way of driving "innovation by tapping into the ingenuity of the American people" to solve those problems that are too big for government to solve on its own. Similarly, David Cameron of the British Conservatives believes that citizen sourcing mechanisms and the advent of Web 2.0 technologies will help usher in "the next age of government" by truly enabling citizens to act on John Kennedy's historic call to "ask not what your country can do for you, but what you can do for your country."

== History ==
Citizen sourcing is a derivative of the term crowdsourcing. "Citizen" is used instead of "crowd" to emphasise its governmental application and civic purpose. Citizen sourcing is a new take on the concept of the coproduction of public services by service users and communities enabled by the maturation of Web 2.0 participatory technologies.

== Examples ==
=== Citizen advocacy ===
For part of the Obama and Trump Administrations, the We the People system collected signatures on petitions, which were entitled to an official response from the White House once a certain number had been reached.

=== Online ideation platforms for government ===
Taiwan uses a system called vTaiwan to crowdsource deliberations over important issues, and to draft proposed legislation for the country's government. It was created in 2015 by the g0v community as part of the Sunflower Student Movement. Output from the platform was influential in the regulation of Uber, allowing fintech experimentation, and dozens of other issues, though not all (such as the legalization of online alcohol sales) were permanently adopted. vTaiwan inspired an in-house government system called Join, which is being used with some local governments who are committing to respond to petitions that have reached a certain threshold of support.

Granicus is an example of another solution that has been implemented in a number of cities like Austin, Texas that allows the public to submit ideas for government services, improve upon these ideas with the help of government employees that moderate the discussions online, and ultimately design solutions in a crowdsourcing fashion that can be implemented by the city. HunchBuzz is another example which has been implemented by New Zealand's central government and is being rolled out to local city councils. Govocal is a more European-oriented ideation platform on which the citizens co-create their city through ideation and citizen-sourcing challenges. Their approach to civic engagement is through gamification, in order to incentivise citizens to share their input. Citizens.is is a similar solution from Iceland used by governments in several countries.

=== Citizen reporting ===
The City of Boston provides a Citizens Connect iPhone App that allows constituents to report various services requests, including for removing graffiti, filling potholes, and fixing traffic lights. A similar system, SeeClickFix, has been adopted in a number of cities across the United States.

=== Disaster response ===
Online communities of citizens such as the Crisis Commons (see Crisis camp) and the International Network of Crisis Mappers provide assistance to professional responders on the ground by performing data-driven tasks, such as locating missing persons (see, for instance, Person finder), converting satellite imagery into street maps (see, for instance, OpenStreetMap), and reporting and processing actionable citizen reports of needs and damage (see, for instance, the Ushahidi platform).

During the COVID-19 pandemic, many countries including Singapore, Australia, Canada, China, Germany and France, developed apps that relied upon citizens to provide personal details which could be used to track and manage the spread of the virus.

=== Patent examination ===
The Peer-to-Patent system enables citizens to assist the United States Patent and Trademark Office (USPTO) in evaluating the validity of patent applications. Following the implementation of Peer-to-Patent, the USPTO started exploring how to further integrate citizens into the patent application review process. They invited experts to present at two roundtables on using citizen submissions in prior art. Presenters at the roundtables included experienced representatives from Peer-to-Patent, Ask Patents, Patexia, and Article One Partners. The USPTO also opened the process up to citizens by requesting public comments and suggestions on how to proceed following each of the two roundtables.

=== Citizen problem solving ===
Several U.S. federal agencies run inducement prize contests, including NASA and the Environmental Protection Agency.

NASA uses crowdsourcing for analyzing some large sets of images, and as part of the Open Government Initiative of the Obama Administration, the General Services Administration collected and amalgamated suggestions for improving federal websites.

The City of Medellin, Colombia uses the power of the citizens' collective intelligence to identify potential solutions for important problems the city faces. The platform structures problems as open challenges; citizens can ideate, propose, identify, filter and vote on solutions, and the Mayor's office reviews and implements solutions of its choosing.

=== Participatory budgeting ===
Some jurisdictions delegate responsibility for allocating a certain portion of their budget to an assembly of interested citizens. This process is known as participatory budgeting; originating in Brazil, it is now used by thousands of cities around the world.

== Research ==
The first conference focusing on Crowdsourcing for Politics and Policy took place at Oxford University, under the auspices of the Oxford Internet Institute in 2014. Research has emerged since 2012 that focuses on the use of crowdsourcing for policy purposes. These include the experimental investigation of the use of Virtual Labor Markets for policy assessment, and an assessment of the potential for citizen involvement in process innovation for public administration.
