= Peer-to-Patent =

Initiative to assist patent offices

The Peer To Patent project is an initiative that seeks to assist patent offices in improving patent quality by gathering public input in a structured, productive manner. Peer To Patent is the first social-software project directly linked to decision-making by the federal government.

An initial pilot project in collaboration with the United States Patent and Trademark Office (USPTO) was completed June 15, 2009. That pilot examined more than 220 patent applications in the fields of software and business methods. The Peer To Patent project has issued two anniversary reports from the initial pilot ( and), and a final report from the initial pilot is pending.

Following the conclusion of the initial pilot the USPTO undertook an evaluation of Peer To Patent assisted by students from Worcester Polytechnic Institute. That evaluation concluded that the program had merit and should be continued. On October 19, 2010, the USPTO and New York Law School jointly announced a new pilot program commencing October 25, 2010, and continuing through September 30, 2011 (with the review period extending through December 31, 2011). This new pilot will not only include patent applications covering subject matter included in the initial pilot, it will now include telecommunications, speech recognition, translation, biotechnology, bioinformatics and biopharmaceuticals.

Other patent offices involved in pilot programs include IP Australia (Peer-to-Patent Australia), the Japan Patent Office, and the Korean Intellectual Property Office. The UK Intellectual Property Office announced on November 4, 2010, that it would commence a pilot in 2011 and the pilot commenced on 1 June 2011.

== Justification and purpose ==
Patents go to the heart of invention, a key driver of technological progress and economic vitality. When the patent system functions correctly, it rewards only meritorious inventions—those that are useful, novel, and not obvious. This in turn encourages more people to exercise their ingenuity and effort to create new inventions. However, for a proper balance to be struck, the system must avoid awarding patents to discourage inventions that lack merit. When the system becomes inconsistent in recognizing true invention, inappropriately issued patents become obstacles for innovation in that technology area. This raises, directly or indirectly, the costs of doing business in that particular area.

The number of patents in the most active jurisdictions (including the ones piloting Peer-to-Patent) has grown over the past few decades.

The rise in patent applications has also placed stress on the patent offices themselves. For example, the USPTO October 31, 2010 had a backlog of about 700,000 patent applications, which is one and a half times the highest number of applications the USPTO has processed in any given year.

Peer To Patent is focused on helping patent offices perform high-quality examinations of pending patent applications by enlisting the public to help find and explain prior art. Prior art are references that predate the date of conception of at least some of the features of a given claimed invention. Prior art can include earlier patents, academic papers, magazine articles, web pages, and even physical examples. Patent examiners compare a claimed invention with the prior art to determine if a given invention is both new (i.e. novel) and not obvious to a person of ordinary skill and creativity of the invention.

Prior to the initiation of Peer To Patent, U.S. patent examiners had the sole responsibility for searching for prior art. Patent examiners have a time budget of a few hours in which to conduct such searches. Peer To Patent attempts to improve the patent process by markedly expanding the prior art search. The reasoning behind the project is that if prior art exists for an invention, particularly non-patent prior art, someone in the world knows about it. This knowledgeable person may be a competitor in the same field, a student or professor, or the owner of an earlier embodiment of the invention. Peer To Patent encourages such people to submit examples of prior art and creates communities of people worldwide who are interested in discovering prior art.

Peer To Patent uses social software features to facilitate discussion amongst groups of volunteer experts. Users can upload prior art references, participate in discussion forums, rate other user submissions, add research references, invite others, and more. This helps the examiners focus their attention on the submission(s) of prior art that have the highest relevance to an application.

== Theoretical underpinnings ==
An understanding of Peer To Patent's philosophical basis is valuable in order to comprehend its operation. The project also has a technological basis, lying in the potential for Internet technologies to structure public input into government processes much more effectively than agencies and legislators have done in the past. Thus, Peer to Patent is more than an intervention into the patent system; it serves as a demonstration of the potential to bring the public more fully into its own governance.

Attempts to involve the public in government decision-making (other than voting and referendums, which are frequently powerful, but are also intermittent and very restrictive of the public's capacity for subtle, expressive input) previously fell into two categories, both usually of minimal impact:

- Free-form online forums. These are useful for the exchange of information, but lack the structures that would permit the formation of coordinated groups and sustained, constructive planning between the public and government officials.
- Web sites with suggestion forms. These tend to draw ill-considered comments from marginally committed participants, lack mechanisms for follow-through, and provide no support for knowledgeable individuals to coordinate their efforts.

The paradigm underlying Peer To Patent is relatively novel, and involves clear goals, direction, and structure. The model is related, however, to many notions of civil society, particularly the theories deliberative democracy, communicative action (Jürgen Habermas), and strong democracy (Benjamin Barber). The more immediate underpinnings are best described in a series of papers by the creator of Peer to Patent, Beth Simone Noveck of New York Law School. Relevant papers include:

- "Democracy of Groups" explains that "self-constituting groups" of volunteers can create value beyond what the individuals in them could accomplish alone. If formed online, such groups require tools to visualize their relationships and formalize contrasting approaches, so the groups can interact productively. New legal categories should also be created to recognize self-constituting groups—just as special categories for corporations now exist—and give them a voice.
- "Electronic Revolution in Rule-Making" criticizes the doctrine of the "insulated bureaucrat" who has been assumed by governments to be the most effective and impartial judge of policy. The paper calls on more democratic input from "on-going communities of interest and expertise," but explains that government attempts to solicit such input generally fail because there is no process to let communities collaborate on input or to fashion input into a form that policy-makers can use. The article points to effective techniques such as allowing individuals to comment on each other's suggestions, providing tools for collaborative editing to bring up the quality of the suggestions, and allowing discussions with group moderation. Social norms and technological innovations must go hand in hand.

The promise of Peer To Patent also draws on the success of various other movements that have created effective, productive communities on the Internet from far-flung individuals: free software and open-source software development, peer-to-peer systems for the collaborative sharing of data and computer processing, and Wikipedia.

== Operation of the project ==
The process described in this section is that used for the USPTO pilot.

=== Patent applicants ===
The USPTO pilot, officially announced in the USPTO's Official Gazette of 26 June 2007, was initially restricted to patent applications from Technology Center 2100 (Computer Architecture, Software and Information Security) that are voluntarily submitted to the project by the owner/assignee. The extended pilot has expanded to include so-called Business Methods patents (class 705) that fall under Technology Center 3600.

To be eligible for Peer To Patent review, a patent application must be filed during the period covered by the pilot. Furthermore, the USPTO tries to provide a representative sample of current patents by limiting the number of applications from any given applicant.

Incentives for submitting an application to the project include:

- Expedited review. Public review begins one month after publication of the application. Review continues for four months, after which the patent examiner conducts an expedited examination of the patent application.
- Potentially stronger patents. If Peer to Patent review works as expected, patents that survive the process have already undergone considerable scrutiny and will be less at risk of a successful challenge later.
- Public service. Applicants can feel they are contributing to a valuable experiment in new models and technologies for public decision-making.

Applicants follow a procedure described on the project's web site to submit patent applications for review.

=== Community review ===
After a patent is published on the Peer To Patent web site, the public can post not only instances of possible prior art, but other useful comments such as common industry terms that might describe the patent. These terms, or Folksonomy tags, are useful to help other experts find prior art. The review process emphasizes and supports group collaboration in the following ways.

- Communication: To notify people who sign up on the web site about new applications, summaries are distributed regularly by email. People visiting the web site can easily see the titles of recent applications and other useful information.
- Productivity: To keep discussion constructive and on topic, each application's site has a facilitator, whose job includes inviting new participants, reminding participants of their goals, and flagging inappropriate postings.
- Self-regulation: A key contribution by participants is to rate prior art submitted by their fellow participants for a particular application. The ten pieces that receive the highest rating are submitted at the end of the review period to the patent examiner assigned to the patent. This limit prevents the examiner from being overwhelmed by a flood of prior art.
- Granularity: Peer-to-Patent breaks down the process of volunteering into single questions and tasks, allowing volunteers to more easily choose which roles to occupy and what to contribute. Participants can opt to post comments, submit prior art, evaluate postings, or be active in group discussion.
- Community-building: a critical aspect of Peer-to-Patent is creating a sense of community among volunteers, which leads to the likelihood of continued participation and can entice volunteers with side benefits. Volunteers describe their interests and qualifications in their profiles, invite colleagues to join the discussions, respond to each other's comments, and enhance the reputations of productive volunteers by giving "thumbs-ups" to their prior art submissions. Examples of potential side benefits are job signaling (demonstrating skills that can lead to job opportunities for students or consultants) and finding colleagues for research projects.

=== The office action ===
The role of the patent examiner in Peer To Patent remains the same as with traditional applications, except that Peer to Patent applications move to the head of the queue, to reward patent applicants who participate, and the patent examiner is forwarded the ten highest rated submissions of prior art from the Peer To Patent community to aid in their examination.

== Governance ==
The Peer To Patent project is an independent project set up by New York Law School and operated through the school's Center for Patent Innovations. An agreement between the USPTO and Peer To Patent allows the project to submit prior art to USPTO examiners.

The steering committee includes patent attorneys from major patent-holding companies. The computer industry provides most of the steering committee members, since the initial pilot focused on Technology Center 2100.

Peer To Patent is funded by project sponsors and by the USPTO. The sponsors include:

- Article One Partners
- General Electric
- Hewlett Packard
- IBM
- Microsoft
- Open Invention Network
- Red Hat

== Technology ==
Except where noted, content on the site is available for noncommercial use through a Creative Commons license.

A description of the technology used on the site is stated in their first anniversary report,

"The Peer To Patent Web site is built using open source technologies. It is an Internet application implemented using Ruby on Rails with a MySQL database on the Linux operating system. The system infrastructure includes hosted Web servers and database servers, as well as load balancers for traffic management. Interactive features include threaded discussions, e-mail alerts, RSS feeds, social bookmarks, video clips, tagging, ratings, and more."

== Future evolution ==
The success of the initial pilot will likely lead to a gradual expansion of Peer To Patent to cover more and more categories of patents; for example the second U.S. pilot has been expanded to include speech recognition, telecommunications, biotechnology, and bioinformatics. Channels, standards, and protocols will be created to let inventors and other participants in the process integrate their own data and work flows.

One feature of the Peer To Patent site allows participants to rate each other's comments, just as they now rate each other's prior art submissions. A future stage of the project may allow patent examiners to consult the public during the office action, so that the public not only submits prior art but helps examiners better understand the relevant subject matter.

More broadly, Peer To Patent shows how the public can become more self-governing by interacting in an organized manner with government officials. Elements of this interaction include:

- Clear goals
- Transparency, created by publicizing and archiving all interactions
- A guarantee that government officials with the power to make decisions will actually take the public input into serious consideration
- Building trust among the community and the ability to listen to each other
- Filtering and rating tools to improve the quality of results
- Visualization tools that allow participants to quickly investigate each other's qualifications and viewpoints, group themselves into caucuses, and see how many people support each position

== Evaluation ==
As of November 24, 2010, there had been 557,560 page views from 114,395 unique viewers in 173 countries or territories. More than 2, 800 people signed up to be reviewers.

Up-to-date statistics about the number of patent applications submitted to Peer To Patent, the number of community participants searching for prior art, and the amount of discussion around each patent can be obtained from the Peer To Patent web site.

Some highlights from the First Anniversary report:

- Peer To Patent attracted more than 2,000 peer reviewers.
- The first 27 office actions issued during the pilot phase showed use of Peer To Patent submitted prior art in nine rejections
- On average, citizen-reviewers contributed 6 hours reviewing each patent application in the pilot
- Although USPTO rules permit third-party prior art submissions on pending applications (but only before the applications have been published, or before a notice of allowance is issued, whichever comes first), the average number of prior art submissions on Peer To Patent applications was 2,000 times that of standard rule-based submissions.
- 92% of patent examiners surveyed said they would welcome examining another application with public participation, while 73% of participating examiners want to see Peer-to-Patent implemented as a regular office practice.
- 21% of participating examiners stated that prior art submitted by the Peer To Patent community was "inaccessible" directly to USPTO examiners.
- Prior art submissions by Peer-to-Patent reviewers were four times as likely to include non-patent literature (any document that is not a patent, including Web sites, journals, textbooks, and databases) as compared to prior art submissions by applicants.

== Criticisms ==
Criticism of the Peer to Patent project range from its goals to its likelihood of success to its unintended consequences. For instance, criticisms can be found in comments posted to two articles favorable to Peer To Patent on the well-known Patently Obvious (Patently-O) blog: articles about the announced launch and the actual launch of the pilot.

Here is a sampling of objections aired in various forums:

- The patent system is too fundamentally out of kilter to be fixed by examining and rejecting individual patents.
- By reviewing patents that belong to categories some people think do not deserve patents (notably software), Peer To Patent implicitly endorses the existence of such patents.
- The problem with many bad patents does not involve the existence of prior art, but a definition by the patent office of "obviousness" that is too forgiving, and therefore allows obvious patents to be approved because they are not precisely the same as prior art.
- The participation process that works for free software and Wikipedia will not work for the patent system because it presents steep challenges of its own. Few people in the general public understand the unique use of language in patent applications or the stages through which an application passes. The current pilot has drawn masses of participants because of its novelty and because computer-related patents are a particularly contested policy area, but this is no guarantee that similar participation will be seen in other areas and over a long term.
- Potential infringers will be afraid to review patent applications because, if the patent is granted, the inventor could successfully argue in court that the infringer knew of the scope of the patent and therefore engaged in wilful infringement, potentially subjecting the infringer to triple damages. This assumes that assurances from the USPTO and Peer To Patent that reviewing an application does not constitute knowledge of the final patent are invalid and will be rejected in court.
- Third parties will be afraid to help overturn a patent application for fear that the applicant (particularly if it's a large company) will retaliate later.
- There are too many patent applications for the public to review every one adequately. Those who have the time and expertise to look for prior art will take their chances, waiting for the patent office to approve patents and then challenging the patents at the patent offices or in court.
- Third parties who submit prior art during the patent application cannot argue in favor of that prior art during the prosecution of the patent (the discussion between the examiner and the applicant). During this ex parte discussion, the applicant has a definite advantage in arguing his or her case. Third parties will therefore wait and reserve their prior art for court cases where they have an equal chance to argue their point. This argument rests on the premise that third parties are willing to assume the hundreds of thousands (or often millions) of dollars in costs that a court challenge requires.
- Large companies will devote resources to denying the applications of their competitors, and small companies will not be able to marshal the corresponding resources to knock out the patents of large companies. This argument assumes that the general public will not step up to the responsibility of reviewing patents.

== See also ==
- Public participation in patent examination
