= Geoff Goodfellow =

American entrepreneur

Geoffrey S. Goodfellow (born 1956 in California) is an American entrepreneur associated with early wireless email ventures.

== Technology career ==
In 1982 he posted a message titled "Electronic Mail for People on the Move" in an ARPANET mailing list called Telecom Digest. In the early 1990s Goodfellow attempted to commercialize this concept in a product called RadioMail. In 1992, Radiomail entered into a partnership with Research in Motion, RAM Mobile Data, and Ericsson. Goodfellow left the company in 1996.

Goodfellow, a contributor to the Jargon File and participant in the early days of the Silicon Valley computer culture, did not believe in patenting his idea. He told The New York Times, "You don't patent the obvious...The way you compete is to build something that is faster, better, cheaper. You don't lock your ideas up in a patent and rest on your laurels."

The inventor, Thomas J. Campana Jr., was granted several patents covering his inventions related to the practical implementation of wireless e-mail. In 2006, after a protracted legal battle, (See NTP Inc.) Research in Motion had to pay $US 615 million to obtain rights to these patents.

In 2006 Goodfellow began researching the cause, nature and origin of what he regards as the critical state of disharmony on the planet.
