= Flicko's Video Services =

Flicko's Video Services is a video workshop franchise based in Fort Oglethorpe, Georgia.

Flicko's was founded by William Bellis Sr. in 2003 in Louisville, Kentucky. Flicko's stores offer self-serve or professional services in editing, format and slide transfers, and video and audio rental equipment. The company specializes in helping customers preserve and edit video and other media.

Flicko's preserves memories for customers by transferring old film, videos, slides, and photos to DVD. The company uses a patent pending film transfer system.

Some Flicko's stores also offer legal videography, specializing in video depositions.

The former corporate owned Louisville, Kentucky, store was the first Flicko's location, opening in 2003. The company has franchises in Tennessee (Georgia), Minnesota, Arizona, North Carolina, Oklahoma, Virginia, and Missouri.
