= Beth Simone Noveck =

American government officer (born 1971)

Beth Noveck
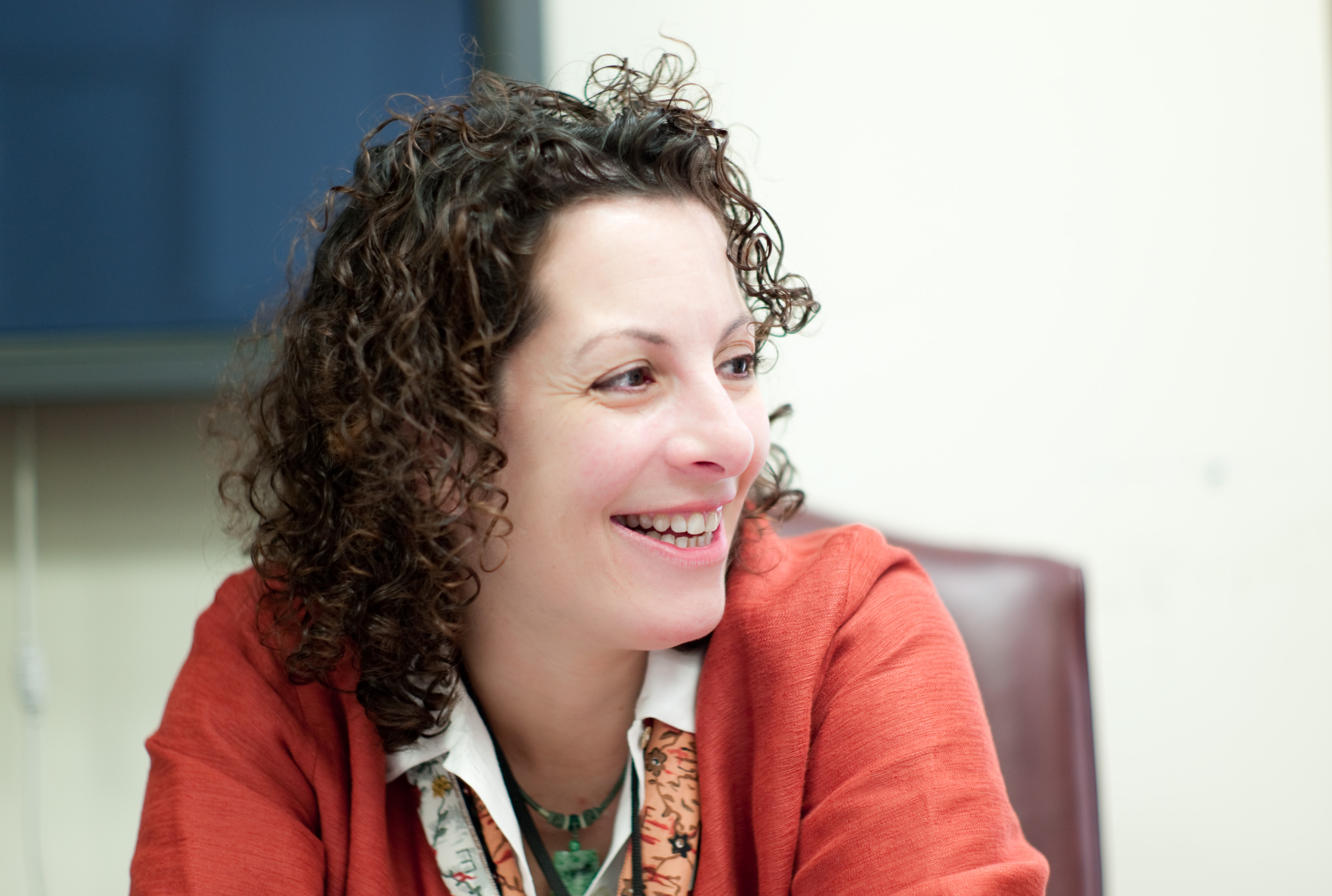
- Noveck in 2009
- Born: July 16, 1971 (age 55); Toms River, New Jersey, U.S.
- Education: Harvard, A.B. 1991, A.M. 1992; University of Innsbruck, Ph.D. 1994; Yale Law School, J.D. 1997
- Occupations: Professor, Northeastern University Director, Burnes Center for Social Change and The Governance Lab Chief AI Strategist, State of New Jersey
- Known for: Open Government Initiative, Peer-to-Patent

Beth Simone Noveck (born 1971) is a professor at Northeastern University and the first Chief AI Strategist for the State of New Jersey. She previously served as founding Chief Innovation Officer of New Jersey. At Northeastern, she directs the Burnes Center for Social Change and its partner project, The Governance Lab. She is also affiliated faculty with the Institute for Experiential AI.

She is also a Visiting Senior Faculty Fellow at the John J. Heldrich Center for Workforce Development at Rutgers University, and a senior fellow at the Yale Law School Information Society Project. She also served as one of nine members of the Digitalrat, a council to advise German Federal Chancellor Angela Merkel on issues concerning the digital transformation of society.

From 2009 to 2011, she was the United States deputy chief technology officer for open government and led President Obama's Open Government Initiative. She also served on the Obama-Biden Transition Team. She was based at the White House Office of Science and Technology Policy, and served as an expert on governance, technology and institutional innovation. On May 16, 2011, she was appointed senior advisor for Open Government by UK Prime Minister David Cameron. She is a commissioner for the Global Commission on Internet Governance. On August 13, 2018, Noveck was appointed by Governor Phil Murphy to be the Chief Innovation Officer of New Jersey.

== Background ==
Raised in Toms River, New Jersey, she graduated from Harvard University with an AM magna cum laude, and the University of Innsbruck with a Ph.D. She graduated from Yale Law School with a JD.

She directs The Governance Lab, also known as the Govlab and its MacArthur Research Network on Opening Governance, which is designed to improve people's lives through innovative governance.

She was formerly the Jacob K. Javits Visiting professor at the Robert F. Wagner Graduate School of Public Service and a visiting professor at the MIT Media Lab. She is a former professor of law at New York Law School. She has also designed or collaborated on Unchat, The Do Tank, Peer To Patent, Data.gov, Challenge.gov and the Gov Lab's Living Labs and training platform, The academy. She works with the Chiba Institute of Technology Center for Radical Transformation in Japan as a Visiting Researcher. She helps edit the Association for Computing Machinery's Digital Government Research and Practice Journal and is a founding associate editor for the Journal of Collective Intelligence.

She was a member of the Scholars Council of the Library of Congress and a board member of the Center for Open Science (COS), the Open Contracting Partnership, the EPSRC Center for the Mathematics of Precision Healthcare, the Yankelovich Democracy Monitor, and the NHS Digital Academy. In addition, Noveck is also a member of the President's Commission on Transparency and Corruption and the Global Future Council on Technology, Values and Policy for the World Economic Forum through the Inter-American Development Bank, the Steering Committee for the Collective Intelligence Conferences and GIGAPP.

She was named one of the Top 100 Global Thinkers by Foreign Policy, one of the "100 Most Creative People in Business" by Fast Company, and one of the "Top Women in Technology" by Huffington Post. She has also been honored by both the National Democratic Institute and Public Knowledge for her work in civic technology.

Previously, Noveck directed the Institute for Information Law & Policy and the Democracy Design Workshop at New York Law School. She is the founder of the "Do Tank," and the State of Play Conferences, and launched Peer-to-Patent, the first community patent review project, in collaboration with the United States Patent and Trade Office. She has taught in the areas of intellectual property, innovation, and constitutional law, as well as courses on electronic democracy and electronic government.

== Books ==
- Solving Public Problems: How to Fix Our Government and Change Our World (Yale University Press, 2021)
- Smart Citizens, Smarter State: The Technologies of Expertise and the Future of Governing (Harvard University Press, 2015)
- Wiki Government: How Technology Can Make Government Better, Democracy Stronger, and Citizens More Powerful (Brookings Institution Press, 2009)
- The State of Play: Law, Games and Virtual Worlds (co-editor; NYU Press, 2006)
