= Peer-to-Patent Australia =

Peer-to-Patent Australia was an initiative designed to improve the patent examination process and the quality of issued patents by connecting the review of pending patents to an open network of experts online.

Peer-to-Patent Australia is focused on helping patent offices perform high-quality examinations of pending patent applications by enlisting the public to help find and explain prior art. The objective of Peer-to-Patent Australia is to improve the patent examination process and the quality of issued patents by inviting members of the public to identify and nominate prior art relevant to the assessment of novelty and inventiveness of participating patent applications. This initiative allows the patent office to harness the expertise of qualified people within the community when assessing patent applications by inviting members of the public to identify and nominate prior art relevant to the assessment of novelty and inventiveness of participating patent applications. In doing so, it connects with the broader initiative to use Web 2.0 technologies to enhance and invigorate government administration through citizen engagement.

== Rationale ==
To justify the award of a patent in Australia, the invention claimed must be novel and involve an inventive step when compared with the prior art base. The prior art base is the state of the art, or the technology in existence, immediately before the priority date, which is usually the date that the patent application is filed. In other words, to justify the grant of a patent, an invention must not have been seen before and must be inventive in the eyes of someone skilled in the relevant art when compared with the existing technology.

Prior art can include earlier patents, academic papers, magazine articles, web pages, and even physical examples. Patent examiners compare a claimed invention with the prior art to determine if a given invention is both novel and not obvious to a person of ordinary skill and creativity of the invention.

Currently in Australia, patent examiners have the sole responsibility for searching for prior art. They have a time budget of a few hours. Peer-to-Patent attempts to improve the patent process by markedly expanding the prior art search. The reasoning behind the proposal is that if prior art exists for an invention, particularly non-patent prior art, someone in the world knows about it. This knowledgeable person may be competitors in the same field, students or professors, or owners of an earlier embodiment of the invention. Peer-to-Patent Australia encourages such people to submit examples of prior art and creates communities of people worldwide who are interested in discovering prior art.

Peer-to-Patent uses social software features to facilitate discussion amongst groups of volunteer experts. Users can upload prior art references, participate in discussion forums, rate other user submissions, add research references, invite others, and more. This helps the examiners focus their attention on the submission(s) of prior art that have the highest relevance to an application.

== Benefits ==
If successful, the project will promote the public interest by improving the quality of issued patents. The public only benefits when monopoly rights are granted for inventions that truly represent a novel and inventive advance over the existing state of the art. The benefit to innovators is that improving the quality of issued patents leads to clearer patent landscapes and reduces the uncertainty surrounding freedom to operate.

The benefit to participating applicants is that their applications will undergo a more rigorous examination against the strictures of novelty and inventiveness and are likely to be more robust as a consequence.

The more robust a patent, the more valuable it is and the less likely it is to be challenged, which is a benefit that represents significant cost savings over time to consumers, patent holders and the public at large. More robust patents are less likely to be litigated or disputed in licensing discussions. As a consequence, the marketplace for such inventions will be more efficient, with time and money not being wasted on ill-conceived litigation. In addition, the identification and elimination of weak claims early in the examination process ultimately saves the applicant money by avoiding the expensive process of pursuing or enforcing non-meritorious patent claims. Finally, it is anticipated that open peer review will encourage applicants to file better constructed and clearer applications and lower the incentive for those who might seek to file low quality applications.

The review process in no way abrogates the responsibility of the patent examiner to assess a patent application. Prior art submitted by Peer-to-Patent Australia is solely designed to assist a patent examiner. The patent examiner remains the arbiter of whether a patent is to be granted.

Peer-to-Patent has generated considerable support internationally. The recent pilot projects run in the United States had the backing of users of the patent system such as IBM, Microsoft, Hewlett-Packard, General Electric, Intel and Yahoo!, who all recognised potential of the project and put forward applications to be peer reviewed.

So far, Peer-to-Patent Australia has the backing of IBM, Hewlett-Packard, General Electric, Aristocrat Technologies Australia Pty Ltd and Residex Pty Ltd.

== Details of the pilot ==
Peer-to-Patent Australia will initially run as a six-month pilot. The first pilot project is set to launch on 9 November 2009.

Up to 40 business method patent, computer software and related patent applications which are open for public inspection will each be posted on the Peer-to-Patent Australia website for a 90-day period. During that time, members of community will be invited to review those patent applications, submit prior art references and comment on the relevance of any prior art that has been put forward.

Each patent application included in the project will be open to peer review for a three-month period. During that time, members of the public can identify prior art references and comment on the relevance of any prior art that has been put forward. At the end of the review period, Peer-to-Patent Australia will forward the top 10 prior art submissions, as selected by the community of reviewers, to IP Australia for consideration in the examination process.

Only applications that have been laid open for public inspection and for which an examination request has been made by the applicant will be included in the pilot. All attempts will be made to include patent applications from a broad range of patent applicants. No more than 10 patent applications from a single patent applicant, inventor, assignee or their affiliates shall be selected for inclusion in the pilot.

The project uses a consent based model. Patent applicants will be asked to consent to having their applications included in the pilot. Patent applicants will be asked to consent to having their applications included in the pilot. A patent application will not be included in the pilot without the express written consent of the applicant or applicants.

The objective of the pilot is to test whether an open community of reviewers can effectively locate prior art that might not otherwise be located by patent examiners during a typical examination. This is an initiative that builds upon the growing trend to use modern Web 2.0 technology to enhance and invigorate government administration through citizen engagement.

After the pilot period has concluded, IP Australia and the Queensland University of Technology will evaluate the project’s success.

== Who runs Peer-to-Patent Australia? ==
Peer-to-Patent Australia is a joint initiative of the Queensland University of Technology (QUT), IP Australia (which houses the Australian patent office). It is also the result of collaboration between of the Queensland University of Technology and New York Law School.

Peer-to-Patent Australia is based upon the successful Peer-to-Patent projects run by the New York Law School in collaboration with the United States Patent and Trademark Office (USPTO) and is part of a push to make Peer-to-Patent an international phenomenon.

== Technology ==
Except where otherwise noted, content on the Peer-to-Patent Australia web site is available for noncommercial use through a Creative Commons license.

== See also ==
- Peer-to-Patent
