= Metal Section Frame =

The metal section frame was an innovation in twentieth century picture framing. It can now be found in museums, galleries, institutions, and homes around the world. The metal section frame was invented by picture framer Donald P. Herbert (1926–1982) in the late 1960s. The frame was designed to fill a void within the framing industry. The concept followed Herbert's attendance at a museum conference in 1967 in Toronto where he met with Dr. Harold Joachim (1909–1983), at that time the Curator of the Department of Prints and Drawings with The Art Institute of Chicago. Dr. Joachim discussed the need for a picture frame that would allow the institute to loan artwork from their collection. He expressed the need for an easily assembled and affordable picture frame. Herbert's solution was the section frame. Originally he planned to call the frame a CPD frame, standing for Curator of Prints and Drawings, but the name Metal Section Frame ended up being used.

== History ==
=== Creation ===
While traveling home from the Toronto conference Herbert began sketching ideas to solve this framing dilemma. By July 1968 the design developed to the point of being ready to file a patent. On October 20, 1970 US patent # 3,534,490 was issued to Donald P. Herbert for the section frame. Patents in Canada and numerous foreign countries followed.

=== Launch ===
With the patent pending, the frames started being produced through the contract division of Kulicke Frames Inc. The aluminum extrusions were initially manufactured by F. A. Pilgrim & Company in Ohio. In 1968 metal section frames were also made available for retail sale for the first time through Brentano's Bookstores in New York City.

== Developments ==
In 1970 Herbert's Canadian patent, 881000, was sold to Frameguild Mouldings. Today they are a division of Nielsen & Bainbridge Canada Inc. In 1972 the U.S. patent, along with the rights to the international patents Herbert received, became the property of Structural Industries in Hicksville, New York when they purchased Herbert's company, Presentation Sales Corporation. There are currently 20 patents listed at Delphion.com, which reference Donald Herbert's original innovative design. Perhaps the best known that reference Herbert's patent are those issued to Helmar Nielsen, 3965601 June 29, 1976; Nielsen Moulding Design Corp. 4122617 October 31, 1978; and Nielsen & Bainbridge LLC. 6339891 January 1, 2002.

Throughout the years the section frame has evolved. Originally only available in a silver or gold finish, they are now available in numerous decorative colors and wide variety of frame profiles. Yet the original, demonstrated in its simplicity and aesthetic design, remains the quintessential foundation upon which subsequent improvements were made.

== Recognition ==
In 1969 Herbert's invention was honored with an International Design Award bestowed upon him by the American Institute of Interior Designers. Today this organization is called the American Society of Interior Designers.

In the decades since its invention by Donald P. Herbert, the metal section frame remains an extremely popular framing option throughout the world.
