= Douglas Hagerman =

American lawyer

Douglas M. Hagerman is Senior Vice President, General Counsel, and Secretary of Rockwell Automation, a company based in Milwaukee, Wisconsin, United States. He is responsible for ensuring that the legal team provides substantial advice on legal solutions towards business objectives. Hagerman was previously employed as a litigation partner for Foley and Lardner and also as a co-shair of the Securities Litigation, Enforcement & Regulation Practice Group.

== Organizations ==
Hagerman is a member of the Council of Chief Legal Officers and the Society of Corporate Secretaries & Governance Professionals. He is the director of the National Association of Manufacturers and in 2011 was elected chairman of the board for Milwaukee Symphony Orchestra.

== Personal ==
Hagerman obtained his degree in economics and accounting from Drake University and is a certified accountant. He later earned his law degree from Harvard Law School.

== Sources ==
- "Executive Profiles – Douglas M. Hagerman". Rockwell Automation. Archived from the original on 2007-10-13.
- "InsideCounsel Magazine Article: "Net-Working"". InsideCounsel. Archived from the original on 2008-06-04.
- Doege, David (2008-02-03). "Expanding the legal pool: Corporations looking to work with minority law firms".
- "Spivak & Bice -- Milwaukee". Archived from the original on 2008-04-07.
- "Wisconsin Asks Strong To Reimburse Legal Fees".
