= NTP, Inc. =

American patent holding company

NTP, Inc. is a Virginia-based patent holding company founded in 1992 by the late inventor Thomas J. Campana Jr. and Donald E. Stout. The company's primary asset is a portfolio of 50 US patents and additional pending US and international patent applications. These patents and patent applications disclose inventions in the fields of Wireless email and RF Antenna design. The named inventors include Andrew Andros and Thomas Campana. About half of the US patents were originally assigned to Telefind Corporation, a Florida-based company (now out of business) partly owned by Campana.

NTP has been characterized as a patent troll because it is a non-practicing entity that aggressively enforces its patent portfolio against larger, well-established companies. The most notable case was against Research in Motion, makers of the BlackBerry mobile email system.

NTP also owns an equity stake in mobile email start up company Visto.

== Patent licenses ==
NTP licensed its mobile email patents to Visto, Nokia, Good Technology, RIM, and RIM's partners. The RIM license agreement was part of an overall settlement of a patent infringement lawsuit brought by NTP against RIM (see below).

NTP attempted to license to Palm, Inc., but license negotiations have broken down. On November 6, 2006, NTP announced that it had filed a patent infringement lawsuit against Palm, Inc. in response to the breakdown in licensing talks. However, on March 22, 2007, United States District Court Judge James R. Spencer (Eastern Division of Virginia, Richmond Division) granted a stay of proceedings in the NTP's lawsuit against Palm, Inc. Judge Spencer also granted Palm's motion to strike from the complaint NTP's allegation of wrongdoing at the U.S. Patent and Trademark Office.

In September 2007, NTP filed patent infringement lawsuits against several large telecommunications companies including AT&T, Sprint Nextel, T-Mobile, and Verizon Wireless. It asserted the same patents that it asserted against RIM. The cases have not yet been settled.

In 2006, the New York Times reported that Geoff Goodfellow, a former Silicon valley entrepreneur who developed and commercialized wireless push email, was reportedly paid $4,000 per day in "hush money" to withhold information that could have potentially invalidated the claims in the NTP v. RIM lawsuit.

== RIM patent infringement litigation ==
In 2000, NTP sent notice of their wireless email patents to a number of companies and offered to license the patents to them. None of the companies took a license. NTP brought a patent infringement lawsuit against one of the companies, Research in Motion, in the United States District Court for the Eastern District of Virginia. This court is well known for its strict adherence to timetables and deadlines, sometimes referred to as the "rocket docket," and is particularly efficient at trying patent cases.

During the trial, RIM tried to show that a functional wireless email system was already in the public domain at the time the NTP inventions had been made. This would have invalidated the NTP patents. The prior system was called "System for Automated Messages" (SAM). RIM demonstrated SAM in court and it appeared to work. But the NTP attorneys discovered that RIM was not using vintage SAM software, but a more modern version that came after NTP's inventions were made. Therefore, the judge instructed the jury to disregard the demonstration as invalid.

The jury eventually found that the NTP patents were valid, that RIM had infringed them, that the infringement had been "willful", and that the infringement had cost NTP $33 million in damages (the greater of a reasonable royalty or lost profits). The judge, James R. Spencer increased the damages to $53 million as a punitive measure because the infringement had been willful. He also instructed RIM to pay NTP's legal fees of $4.5 million and issued an injunction ordering RIM to cease and desist infringing the patents. This would have shut down the BlackBerry systems in the US.

RIM appealed all of the findings of the court. The injunction and other remedies were stayed pending the outcome of the appeals.

In March 2005, during the appeals process, RIM and NTP tried to negotiate a settlement of their dispute. One of the terms of the settlement was to be for $450 million. But negotiations broke down due to other issues. On June 10, 2005 the matter returned to the courts.

In early November 2005 the US Department of Justice filed a brief requesting that RIM's service be allowed to continue because of the large number of BlackBerry users in the US Federal Government.

In January 2006, the US Supreme Court refused to hear RIM's appeal of the holding of liability for patent infringement, and the matter was returned to a lower court. The previously granted injunction preventing all RIM sales in the US and use of the BlackBerry device might have been enforced by the presiding district court judge had the two parties not been able to reach a settlement.

On February 9, 2006, the US Department of Defense (DOD) filed a brief stating that an injunction shutting down the BlackBerry service while excluding government users was unworkable. The DOD also stated that the BlackBerry was crucial for national security given the large number of government users.

On February 9, 2006, RIM announced that it had developed software workarounds that would not infringe the NTP patents, and would implement those if the injunction was enforced.

Even though in the meantime, the U.S. Patent Office had already re-examined the patents in question and concluded they were invalid (see below), that decision was subject to review and appeal (and the patents were as a matter of legal fiction valid until such time), and with the results certainly not being known before the court of first instance's ruling on the injunction (it had denied a stay of the proceedings), there was a strong incentive for the parties to reach a settlement.

On March 3, 2006, after a stern warning from Judge Spencer, RIM and NTP announced that they had settled their dispute. Under the terms of the settlement, RIM has agreed to pay NTP $612.5 million (USD) in a "full and final settlement of all claims." In a statement, RIM said that "all terms of the agreement have been finalized and the litigation against RIM has been dismissed by a court order this afternoon. The agreement eliminates the need for any further court proceedings or decisions relating to damages or injunctive relief." The settlement is believed low by some analysts, because of the absence of any future royalties on the technology in question.

== Patent reexaminations ==
During the litigation, RIM found previously unconsidered prior art that "raised a substantial new question of patentability" of the NTP patents. RIM filed 12 "requests for a reexamination" in the US Patent and Trademark Office (USPTO) from December 2002 to May 2005. A team of senior patent examiners at the USPTO was assigned to the cases and the cases were granted "special" status. Special status means that the proceedings are accelerated.

NTP became suspicious of contacts between RIM and the PTO, prompting the company to file FOIA requests which revealed attempts by RIM attorney David Stewart to obtain off-the-record interviews with PTO examiners, though such interviews are prohibited by federal regulations (e.g., 37 CFR 1.560(a), stating that "requests that reexamination requesters participate in interviews with examiners will not be granted" and 37 CFR 1.955 stating that "interviews prohibited in inter partes reexamination proceedings").

RIM and NTP filed thousands of pages of documentation and expert opinions to support their respective positions. Some of the cases have been examined and some of the patents were rejected. In two of the cases, the rejections were made final.

NTP has appealed the final rejections to the USPTO's Board of Patent Appeals and Interferences (BPAI). A key issue is whether certain documents found in a Norwegian library should be considered "publications" and would therefore anticipate the claims of the patents. These documents are known as the "Telenor" documents.

The BPAI affirmed the rejection and NTP appealed the decision the US Court of Appeals for the Federal Circuit (CAFC). On August 1, 2011, the CAFC vacated in part, reversed in part, and remanded the case back to the USPTO. The CAFC agreed that the Telenor documents were a valid reference, but that the USPTO had given the phrase "electronic email [message]" an overly broad interpretation in its rejection of the claims.

== 2010 Litigation ==
On 2010-07-09, NTP filed suit against Apple, Google, HTC, LG, Microsoft and Motorola. On Dec. 9, 2010, Article One Partners announced that 3 of the patents held by NTP would be posted to their online community to utilize Public participation in patent examination.

== 2012 Settlements ==
NTP announced on July 23, 2012, that it has settled patent suits with AT&T Inc., Verizon Wireless, Sprint Nextel Corp., T-Mobile USA, Apple Inc., HTC Corp., Motorola Mobility Holdings Inc. (now part of Google Inc.), Palm Inc. (now part of Hewlett-Packard Co.), LG Electronics, Samsung Electronics, Google Inc., Microsoft Corp., and Yahoo Inc. The terms of the settlements were not disclosed.

== Patents in question ==
(This may not be a comprehensive list)

- U.S. patent 6,317,592 - Electronic mail system with RF communications to mobile processors
- U.S. patent 6,272,190 - System for wireless transmission and receiving of information and method of operation thereof
- U.S. patent 6,198,783 - System for wireless serial transmission of encoded information
- U.S. patent 6,067,451 - Electronic mail system with RF communications to mobile processors
- U.S. patent 5,819,172 - Electronic mail system with RF communications to mobile radios
- U.S. patent 5,751,773 - System for wireless serial transmission of encoded information
- U.S. patent 5,745,532 - System for wireless transmission and receiving of information and method of operation thereof
- U.S. patent 5,631,946 - System for transferring information from an RF receiver to a processor under control of a program stored by the processor and method of operation thereof
- U.S. patent 5,625,670 - Electronic mail system with RF communications to mobile processor
- U.S. patent 5,438,611 - Electronic mail system with RF communications to mobile processors originating from outside of the electronic mail system and method of operation thereof

== USPTO reexamination serial numbers ==
This list may not be complete. Several cases have been merged.

=== Ex Parte Reexaminations ===
- 90/006,491 filed on 12-26-2002
- 90/006,493 filed on 12-26-2002
- 90/006,494 filed on 12-26-2002
- 90/006,495 filed on 12-26-2002
- 90/006,678 filed on 06-24-2003
- 90/006,680 filed on 06-24-2003
- 90/006,681 filed on 06-24-2003
- 90/007,723 filed on 09-16-2005
- 90/007,726 filed on 09-22-2005
- 90/007,735 filed on 09-28-2005 - on appeal to the Court of Appeals for the Federal Circuit

=== Inter Partes Reexaminations ===
- 95/000,011 filed on 04-17-2003
- 95/000,020 filed on 05-29-2003

== See also ==
- Patent holding company
- Patent troll
