= LIBOX =

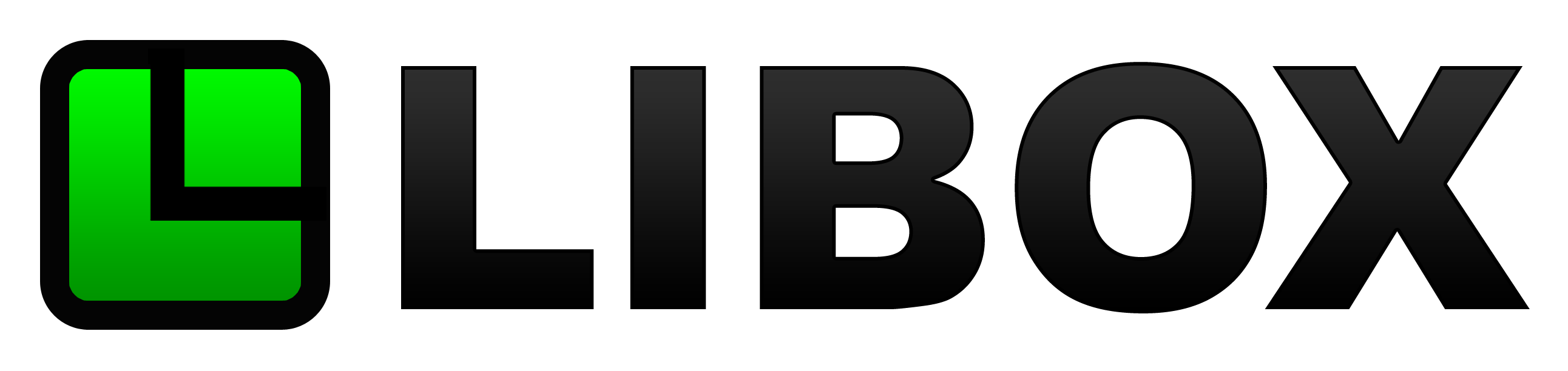
- Developer: Erez Pilosof
- Release: June 22, 2010
- Operating system: Cross-platform
- Available in: English
- Website: http://www.libox.com/

LIBOX was a free platform that allowed users to access and share their high definition media collections, including video, photos and music, across various devices and with friends. LIBOX offered this service for free thanks to a patent pending combination of peer-to-peer, grid and distributed computing technologies. LIBOX consisted of a downloadable desktop application that works on both Windows PCs and Macs, and a web-based interface. The service was accessed by any Web browser and placed no limitations on the amount of media that can be added or the number of people with which it can be shared.

== History ==
LIBOX was founded in 2008 by Erez Pilosof, who previously founded Walla!, the first major web portal in Israel. Pilosof created LIBOX to allow users to manage and share media across all devices and keep its original high quality. He saw that as a consumer, trying to store your media on several different devices and in many different partial areas online was becoming an annoyance; it "seemed very limited and tedious and problematic” Pilosof created LIBOX as a way to provide a smooth and dependable way for people to enjoy his/her media anywhere.

The company started working on the patent-pending technology to power LIBOX in the Fall of 2008, released an Alpha version in October 2009 and launched a Beta version on June 22, 2010. The company has received funding from investors such as Evergreen Venture Partners and Rhodium to help grow the platform.

LIBOX closed down in 2011.

== Technology ==
The distributed LIBOX platform effectively creates private clouds that communicate between devices and Web browsers through a combination of algorithms, grids and peer-to-peer networking technologies. Files are not uploaded to an external server but streamed straight from the computer of the user that holds the file. The mixture of technologies allows LIBOX to never limit how much media can be added to the platform, while keeping the service free for users. The LIBOX platform uses a single interface rendered in HTML across desktop, web and mobile applications. The LIBOX mobile applications are expected to be made available in Summer 2010.

== Functionality ==
The platform allows users to “simply add a song to the Libox desktop application” making it “instantly available on a user’s smartphone and any other computer through a web browser.” When it introduces native mobile applications, LIBOX will allow you to take a photo or record a song on a mobile device and automatically add it to your LIBOX library, accessible across your devices. Ultimately, it syncs all of media regardless of “file formats, folders, settings” and allows users to not worry about "file quality loss or cloud storage capacity."

LIBOX also allows users to share their media collection with other LIBOX users. The platform lets users create contact lists and instantly invite friends to enjoy their media. LIBOX uses the same technology to sync as it does to share it with friends.
