= Article One Partners =

- Industry: Patent translations, patent searches, patent database, crowd searching
- Founded: 2008
- Headquarters: New York City, New York
- Key people: Andrew Brode, Chairman
- Parent: RWS Group

Article One Partners (AOP) is an online prior art search and intellectual property research crowdsourcing community. AOP was acquired by RWS Group in October 2017 and the AOP Connect crowdsourcing platform is now part of the IP Research group within RWS. RWS IP Research provides crowdsourced prior-art-search services by utilizing an online research community. The company's President stated that, as of June 30, 2018, AOP comprises "more than 40,000 in over 170 countries".

Since launching in late 2008, AOP states that, as of October 2018, it has rewarded more than US$8,821,214 to its researchers.

== History ==
AOP was founded in November 2008 by attorneys Cheryl Milone and Steven Powell. It was backed by venture capital firms Alleghany Capital Corporation, General Catalyst Partners, and the former head of intellectual property policy and strategy at Microsoft Marshall Phelps, with investments totaling $15 million by January 2013.

In October 2013, Phelps was announced as the new Chief Executive Officer of AOP.

In April 2016, the company announced that it had surpassed the $7-million mark in researcher rewards. In late-October 2016, the company stated that it had completed 178 Public Studies and 383 Private Studies for the year so far.

AOP was acquired by RWS in October 2017 and is now a part of the IP Research division of RWS. The company was rebranded to RWS Information US LLC in October 2018.

== Products and services ==
=== Studies ===
To conduct its intellectual-property research projects, referred to as "Studies", AOP posts the project requirements and descriptions online as a request for the "crowd" of researchers to submit relevant research submissions. Researchers are required to "make at least one submission that matches the requirements of the Study", and rewards are dispensed to the selected "top responses" when the Study is closed. The patent-research Studies of AOP include patent infringement cases, and the company performs both "Private" and "Public" Studies.

Rewards of up to $6,500 are posted for each Study and are paid to researchers based on the quality of their submissions.

=== AOP Connect ===
AOP Connect is a technology platform that supports the worldwide crowdsourcing process and delivers value added results to clients.

== Past public studies ==
=== NTP, Inc. ===
In December 2010, Article One Partners launched community examination of three patents owned by NTP Inc., a non-practicing entity. The patents in question were central to the ongoing patent infringement suits filed by NTP against Apple, Google, Microsoft, HTC, LG, and Motorola. The patent-review studies were launched with rewards of $10,000 offered for researchers who presented the most relevant evidence around mobile-email technologies.

=== Interval licensing ===
In March 2011, Article One Partners launched community examination of patents owned by Interval Research Corporation, a non-practicing entity co-founded by Paul Allen and David Liddle. The patents were the subject of a lawsuit filed by Interval Research Corp. against defendants Apple, Google, Facebook, Yahoo!, AOL, eBay, Netflix, OfficeMax, and Staples. In the lawsuit, Interval Research Corp. asserted that the defendants used technology on their websites that was originally created by a company owned by Allen.

=== Mobile application developers ===
In June 2011, AOP launched a community examination of a patent owned by Macrosolve. The patent is central to Macrosolve's patent infringement claims against 30 mobile application development companies. This examination was followed by another announcement of the launch of three studies regarding patents held by the patent-licensing company Lodsys. These patents were involved in patent-infringement claims against several application-development companies, as well as larger companies including Sam's Club, Best Western, Adidas, and Best Buy.

=== Other litigation ===
Although the company stresses the importance of client confidentiality, the company launch in 2008 included the announcement of multiple high-profile cases. These cases included:

- Pfizer assertion against Teva Pharmaceutical Industries over a cholesterol medication.
- Research In Motion assertion against Motorola around wireless device technology.
- Konami Corporation assertion against Harmonix Music Systems, MTV Networks, and Viacom in the video game industry.

== Awards ==
In 2009, Article One Partners won the Silicon Valley Startup of the Year.

== See also ==
- Public participation in patent examination
- Internet as a source of prior art
- List of crowdsourcing projects
