= Certificate of contested validity =

In United Kingdom patent law, a certificate of contested validity is an order usually made by the Patent Office, Patents Court (a division of the High Court) or Patents County Court after a patent infringement action in which the validity of the patent is unsuccessfully challenged.

Section 65 of the UK Patents Act 1977 allows the Court to make such an order. If the patent is enforced again against another infringer, and the validity of the patent is unsuccessfully challenged again, the second infringer is penalised by way of an award of indemnity costs - i.e. legal costs above the usual scale and closer to the actual costs incurred by the patentee in defending the challenge.

== See also ==
- Non-binding opinion (United Kingdom patent law)
