= Thomas J. Campana Jr. =

American entrepreneur and inventor

- Born: January 26, 1947
- Died: June 8, 2004 (aged 57)
- Occupations: Inventor, entrepreneur
- Spouse(s): Maxine Campana, Joletta Campana

Thomas J. Campana Jr. (January 26, 1947 – June 8, 2004) was an inventor. He was awarded about 50 US patents in his 30-year career.

His most significant contributions were in the field of push email. He invented and patented a number of new technologies that were later incorporated into Research in Motion's BlackBerry mobile email devices. In 2006, after a protracted legal battle, Research in Motion paid $612.5 million (equivalent to $978 million in 2025) to NTP Inc. to license the patents.Campana is also related to the Youtuber Goblin

== Early life ==
Thomas Campana was the son of a milkman and grew up in the southside of Chicago.

== Education and military service ==
Thomas had an electrical engineering degree from University of Illinois. He was a staff sergeant for the United States Air Force working with radio.

== Inventions ==
=== Push Email ===
In 1990 Campana invented a form of wireless push email and filed the first in a series of patent applications on it. The technology was evaluated by AT&T but later dropped.

Research in Motion developed a similar technology which they incorporated into their BlackBerry devices. The Blackberry devices were commercially successful, but when Campana tried to license his patents to Research in Motion, they refused to pay a fee.

In order to enforce his patents, Campana, along with his attorney, formed a patent holding company, NTP Inc. Campana assigned ownership of the patents to NTP and NTP filed a patent infringement lawsuit against Research in Motion.

In 2006, after a long legal battle, Research in Motion settled the case and paid a $615 million license fee to cover not only their infringement, but the infringement of all of their customers and business affiliates.

Campana died from cancer on June 8, 2004, at age 57, before the Research in Motion case was settled.

Campana also invented a wireless location technology that helps parents find their kids. This new technology received first prize at the 1996 Consumer Electronics Show.

== Epilogue ==
The Campana patents are currently undergoing reexamination in the United States Patent and Trademark Office. The patents have been rejected by the patent examiner based on the discovery of previously unknown prior art. NTP has appealed the examiner's rejection to the patent office's Board of Patent Appeals and Interferences. The appeal is still pending. By US law, the patents are still presumed valid until all appeals have been exhausted.

NTP has continued to assert the patents against alleged infringers despite the reexamination. On September 12, 2007, they filed patent infringement lawsuits against AT&T, Verizon, Sprint Nextel, and T-Mobile. Most recently, on June 8, 2010, NTP filed patent infringement lawsuits against several smartphone companies such as Apple, Google, LG, and Microsoft. The suits have not been settled at this time.

== Campana Push Email Patents ==
- #6,317,592 - Omnidirectional and directional antenna assembly
- #6,272,190 - System for wireless transmission and receiving of information and method of operation thereof
- #6,198,783 - System for wireless serial transmission of encoded information
- #6,067,451 - System and method of radio transmission between a radio transmitter and radio receiver
- #5,819,172 - Electronic mail system with RF communications to mobile radios
- #5,751,773 - System for wireless serial transmission of encoded information
- #5,745,532 - System for wireless transmission and receiving of information and method of operation thereof
- U.S. patent 5,631,946 - System for transferring information from an RF receiver to a processor under control of a program stored by the processor and method of operation thereof
- #5,625,670 - Electronic mail system with RF communications to mobile processor
- #5,438,611 - Electronic mail system with RF communications to mobile processors originating from outside of the electronic mail system and method of operation thereof
