= Internet as a source of prior art =

Legality status of citing the Internet for state-of-the-art public knowledge

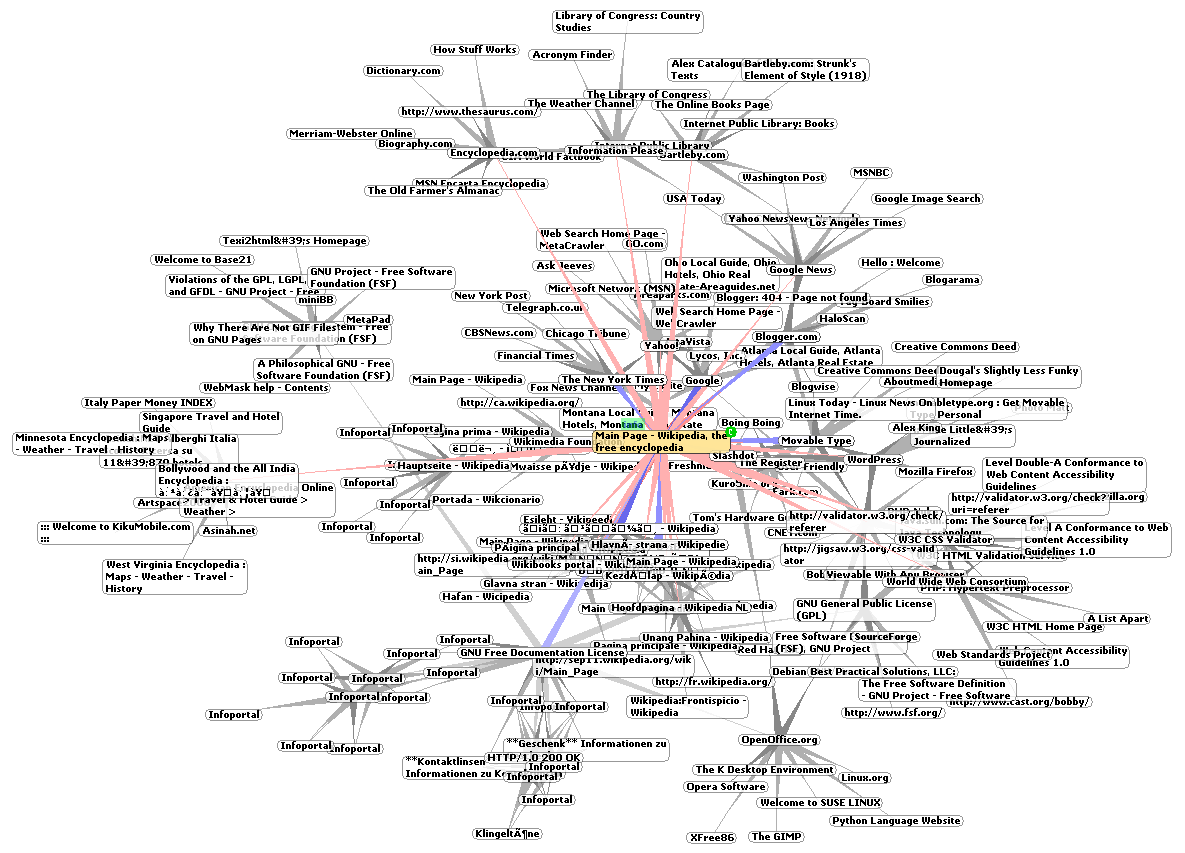
Graphic representation of less than 0.0001% of the WWW, one of the services accessible via the Internet, representing some of the hyperlinks. The use of the Internet as prior art in patent law is surrounded by concerns as to its reliability.

In the context of patent law, using the Internet as a source of prior art when assessing whether an invention is novel and inventive (two conditions for patentability), may be problematic if it is difficult to ascertain precisely when information on websites became available to the public.

== Background ==
In most patent laws, an (alleged) invention must be new and inventive (or non-obvious, which is basically synonymous of inventive) to be considered patentable, i.e., to be validly patented. An invention is considered new if it does not form part of the prior art (or state of the art), i.e., if it was not already disclosed in the prior art. An invention is considered inventive if it is not obvious in view of the prior art. The prior art is essentially everything available to the public before the filing date of the patent.

In practice, if a device or a method was already known (e.g. described in a scientific paper) before the filing date of the patent covering the device or the method or if the device or method is obvious in view of what was known before the filing date, then, in general, it is not considered new (because known before the filing date) or not considered inventive (because obvious in view of what was known before the filing date of the patent), and then not considered patentable. A patent cannot be obtained for the device or method, or, if obtained (granted), it can generally be "invalidated".

The identification of the prior art is therefore of utmost importance to determine whether an invention is patentable, i.e. whether a patent can be granted for an invention (or whether a patent granted for an invention is valid). The purpose of the novelty criterion is to prevent the prior art being patented again.

The Internet is a popular source of technical information and is of particular interest for the purposes of establishing the prior art. Its use is however surrounded by concerns as to its reliability.

== Jurisdictions ==
=== European Patent Organisation ===
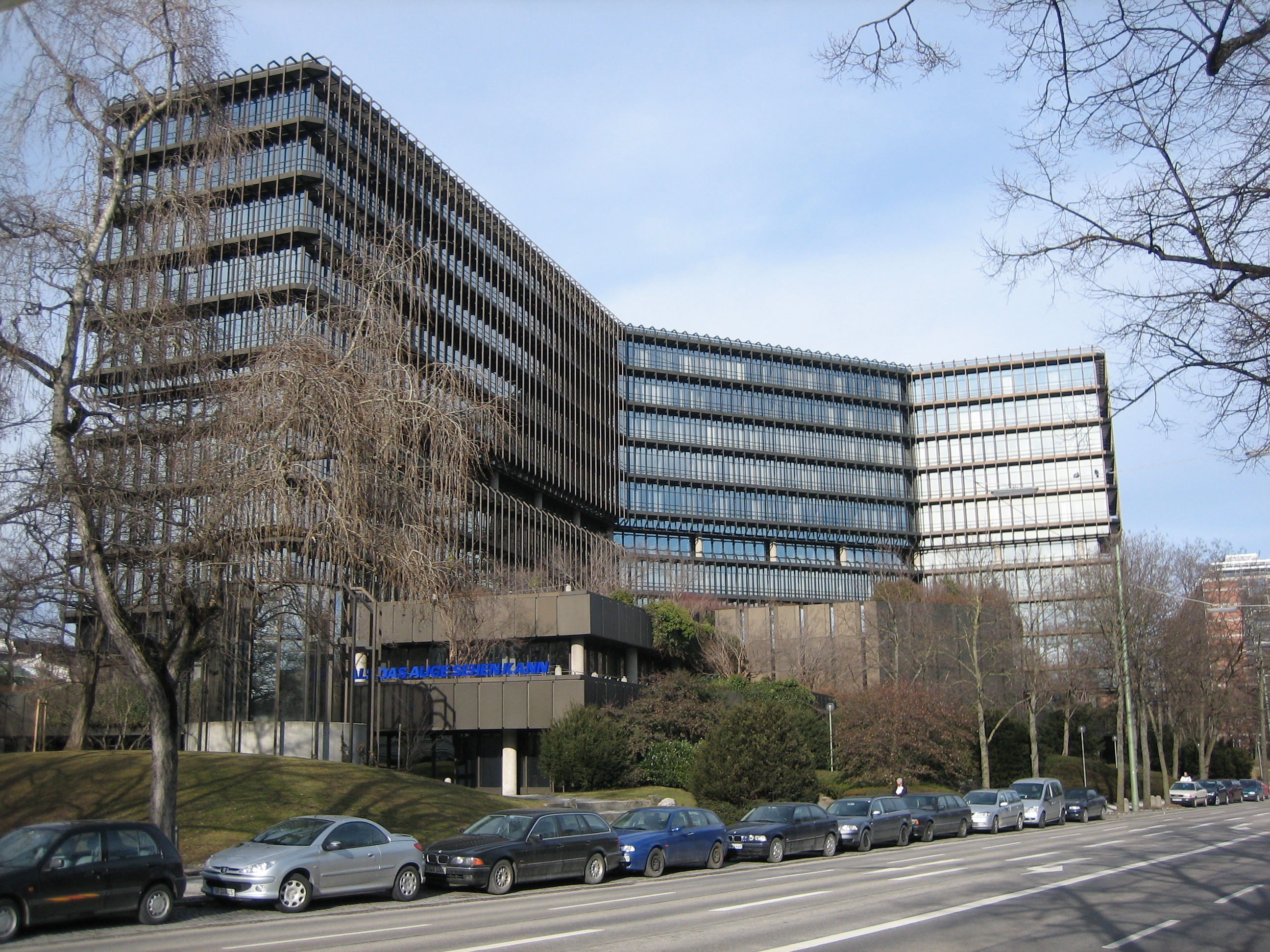
European Patent Office (EPO) headquarters in Munich, Germany.

In August 2009, the European Patent Office (EPO) published a "notice concerning internet citations" to "[set] out the practice followed at the EPO when citing documents retrieved from the internet in both the European and the PCT procedure." The notice is not binding on the Boards of Appeal. Regarding the standard of proof, the notice reads:

"When an internet document is cited against an application or patent, the same facts are to be established as for any other piece of evidence, including standard paper publications ... This evaluation is made according to the principle of "free evaluation of evidence" ... That means that each piece of evidence is given appropriate weight according to its probative value, which is evaluated in view of the particular circumstances of each case. For assessing these circumstances, the balance of probabilities will be used as the standard of proof, as generally applied by the boards of appeal. According to this standard, it is not sufficient that the alleged fact (e.g. the publication date) is merely probable; the examining division must be convinced that it is correct. It does mean, however, that proof beyond reasonable doubt ("up to the hilt") of the alleged fact is not required."

In 2012, Board of Appeal 3.5.04 issued two decisions, namely T 1553/06 and T 2/09, on the issue of Internet disclosures. The two decisions originate from a contrived test case built by the parties, i.e. the patent proprietor and the opponent. In decision T 1553/06 (page 72), the Board proposed a test to decide whether a document stored on the World Wide Web has been made available to the public, whereas, in decision T2/09, the Board dealt with the alleged public availability of an email transmitted over the Internet.

The EPO Guidelines cite the Internet Archive as well as Wikipedia as possible and credible sources of prior art.

=== Germany ===
In 2002, "the Bundespatentgericht in case BPatG 17W (pat) 1/02 (see GRUR 2003 Heft 04, pp 323-325) confirmed in later BPatG 17W (pat) 47/00, ruled that the Internet was not a reliable source for determining the state of the art. This applied also to web archives such as the Internet Archive."

=== United States ===
Internet publications can be relied on as printed publications and thus as prior art under United States patent law. The effective date of the publication will be determined by evidence, such a date of posting listed in the publication itself, or a date of archiving in the Internet Archive.

In August 2006, the United States Patent and Trademark Office (USPTO) ordered examiners to stop using Wikipedia as a source of information for determining the patentability of inventions. However, according to The Patent Librarian's Notebook's blog, examiners continue to cite it, and the number of United States patents issued in 2008 that cited Wikipedia articles nearly doubled to 477, compared to 2007. It increased to 809 citations in 2009.

== See also ==
- Public participation in patent examination
- Search report
