= Patentability =

Concept in patent law

Within the context of a national or multilateral body of law, an invention is patentable if it meets the relevant legal conditions to be granted a patent. By extension, patentability also refers to the substantive conditions that must be met for a patent to be held valid.

== Requirements ==
The patent laws usually require that, for an invention to be patentable, it must be:

- Patentable subject matter, i.e., a kind of subject-matter eligible for patent protection (also called "statutory patentable subject-matter")
- Novel (i.e. at least some aspect of it must be new)
- Non-obvious (in United States patent law) or involve an inventive step (in European patent law and under the Patent Cooperation Treaty)
- Useful (in U.S. patent law) or be susceptible of industrial application (in European patent law)

Usually the term "patentability" only refers to the four aforementioned "substantive" conditions, and does not refer to formal conditions such as the "sufficiency of disclosure", the "unity of invention" or the "best mode requirement".

Judging patentability is one aspect of the official examination of a patent application performed by a patent examiner and may be tested in post-grant patent litigation.

Prior to filing a patent application, inventors sometimes obtain a patentability opinion from a patent agent or patent attorney regarding whether an invention satisfies the substantive conditions of patentability.

== Opposition and reexamination ==
Many national and regional patent offices provide procedures for reconsidering whether or not a given patent is valid after grant. Under the European Patent Convention, any person can file an opposition provided they act promptly after the patent is granted. In the United States, members of the public can initiate reexamination proceedings. Japan provides similar options. In India, the Patent Act provides for a dual opposition system i.e. pre-grant opposition as well as post grant opposition. While a pre-grant opposition may be filed by any person, the post grant opposition may only be filed by a person interested in the field of invention.

Members of the public can also initiate lawsuits in the courts of various nations to have patents declared invalid.

United Kingdom patents can be reviewed by way of a non-binding opinion issued by the Patent Office, or by formal applications for revocation before the Patent Office or the Court. If the patent survives a revocation action, this fact is noted for future reference by way of a Certificate of contested validity.

== Infringement ==
The fact that an invention is patentable or even patented does not necessarily mean that use of the invention would not also infringe another patent. The first patent in a given area might include a broad claim covering a general inventive concept if there is at that point no relevant prior art. Later, a specific implementation of that concept might be patentable if it is not disclosed in the earlier patent (or any intervening prior art), but nevertheless still falls within the scope of the earlier claim (covering the general concept). This means that the later inventor must obtain a license from the earlier inventor to be able to exploit their invention. At the same time, the earlier inventor might want to obtain a license from the later inventor, particularly if the later invention represents a significant improvement in the implementation of the original broad concept. In this case, the two enter into a cross license.

For example, Thomas Edison's thin carbon filament light bulb was a patentable improvement over the earlier patented Woodward and Evans thick carbon filament light bulb. Thomas Edison bought the Woodward patent for $5,000 US before he began his development work so that Woodward would not be able to later sue him for patent infringement after Edison became commercially successful.

== National laws ==
=== United States ===
Under United States patent law, inventorship is also regarded as a patentability criterion. It is a constitutional requirement, since the language of the US Constitution authorizes "the exclusive Right to their ... Discoveries" to Inventors only. The most significant implication of this requirement, which makes the US practice different from all other countries, is the fact that only actual people-inventors (and not their employer) can apply for a US patent. For this reason, patent applications filed via the Patent Cooperation Treaty often have two sets of applicants: the physical individuals for the US, and the legal entity (employer) for all other countries.

The requirement to list actual human inventors was further confirmed by case law: "Inventorship is indeed relevant to patentability under 35 U.S.C. § 102(f), and patents have in the past been held unenforceable for failure to correctly name inventors in cases where the named inventors acted in bad faith or with deceptive intent."

Another difference between the practices of the United States Patent and Trademark Office (USPTO) and other patent offices is the requirements for non-obviousness and for inventive step. Although both requirements have the same purpose to prevent patent issuance for routine improvements/modifications (rather than for true inventions), the practical analyses of these criteria are based on different rules and sometimes result in different outcomes (see Inventive step and non-obviousness for more details).

Details on patentability in the U.S. can be found in the Manual of Patent Examining Procedure or MPEP. This is published by the USPTO and is the reference manual used by both patent examiners and patent agents/attorneys. Chapter 2100, in particular, gives a comprehensive overview of the standards for patentability, a discussion of the related case law, and guidance on how to overcome an examiner's rejection of a given set of claims.

In the United States, the patent grant is presumptive, e.g. a patent shall issue unless the patent statutes preclude the grant. In other words, the burden is on the Patent Office to prove why a patent should not be granted. Once a patent issues, it is presumed valid and a court may declare it invalid only on the basis of clear and convincing evidence.

=== Europe ===
Terminology in Europe, within the member states of the European Patent Organisation, is slightly different from U.S. terminology. While in the U.S. all patent applications are considered to cover inventions automatically, in Europe a patent application is first submitted to a test whether it covers an invention at all: the first out of four tests of Article 52(1) EPC (the other three being novelty, inventive step, and industrial applicability). So an "invention" in European legal terminology is similar to "patentable subject-matter" in the American system. Articles 52-57 of the European Patent Convention are concerned with patentability.

=== India ===
Under the Indian Patent Act (1970), "inventions" are defined as a new product or process involving an inventive step and capable of industrial application. Thus the patentability criteria largely involves novelty, inventive step and industrial application or usability of the invention. In addition, section 3 of the Patent Act, 1970, also provides a list of non-patentable inventions for e.g. inventions that are frivolous or contrary to well established to natural laws.

== Quotes ==
[The question whether there is a patentable invention] is as fugitive, impalpable, wayward, and vague a phantom as exists in the whole paraphernalia of legal concepts. It involves, or it should involve, as complete a reconstruction of the art that preceded it as is possible. The test of invention is the originality of the discovery, and discovery depends upon the mental act of conceiving the new combination, for substantially every invention is only a combination. Nothing is more illusory, as nothing is more common, than to assume that this can be measured objectively by the magnitude of the physical readjustments required. Courts never tire, or at least in earlier times they never did, of expatiating upon the freshness of insight which observes a little, but fruitful, change which had theretofore escaped detection by those engaged in the field. When all is said, we are called upon imaginatively to project this act of discovery against a hypostatized average practitioner, acquainted with all that has been published and all that has been publicly sold. If there be an issue more troublesome, or more apt for litigation than this, we are not aware of it. (...)

- US Judge Learned Hand in Harries v. Air King Prod. Co., 183 F.2d 158, 162 (2d Cir. 1950).

== See also ==
- Idea-expression divide, a copyright law concept often [erroneously] raised in the patent context.
