= The GovLab =

Research center at New York University

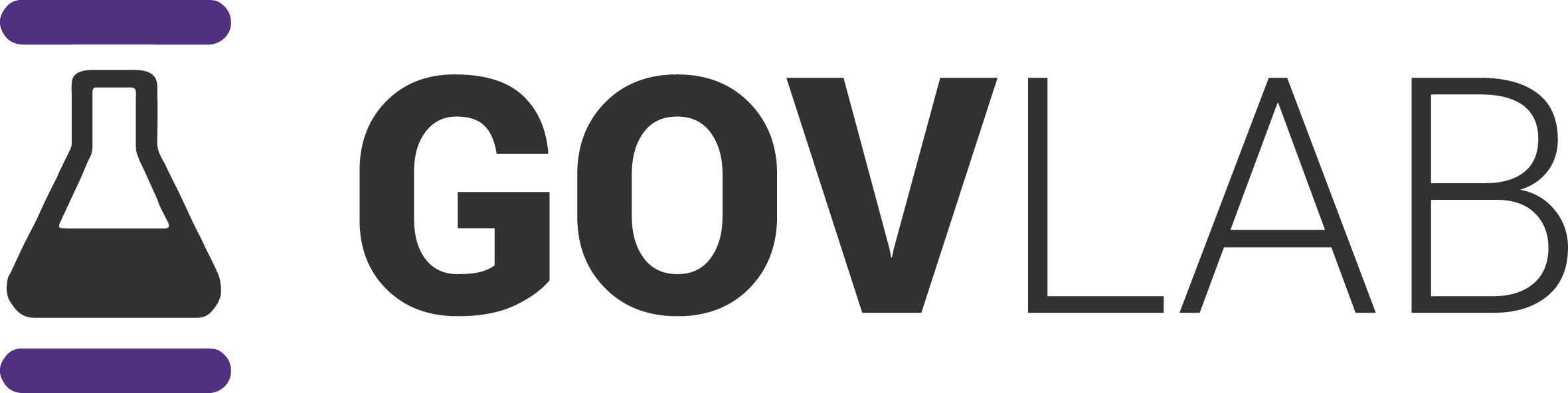
- The GovLab logo
- Formation: 2012 (14 years ago)
- Type: Academic
- Purpose: Innovation
- Headquarters: Northeastern University
- Location: Boston, Massachusetts
- Founders: Beth Simone Noveck & Stefaan Verhulst
- Website: The GovLab Official Website

== Summary of Projects ==
Much of The GovLab’s work involves using technology to connect governments to expertise outside those governments, including among the citizenry and in the private sector. Some of The GovLab’s areas of focus are:

- Open Data
- Open government
- Coaching & Mentorship via The GovLab Academy

The World Bank and The GovLab study the impact of open government in collaboration with partners such as Global Integrity, Results for Development Institute and the Open Government Partnership.

More information can be found in the projects section of The GovLab's website.

== Media Recognition ==
Modern Healthcare Magazine described The GovLab's research work with NHS England, describing the outcomes of the work as increasing "the use of data to produce greater accountability within healthcare organizations, enable consumers to make better-informed choices when selecting providers, improve treatment outcomes, increase patient satisfaction and efficiency, and spur innovation and economic growth."
