= Backlog of unexamined patent applications =

More U.S. utility patents have been issued in the most recent thirty years than in the first 200 years in which they were issued (1790–1990).

Although not clearly defined, the backlog of unexamined patent applications consists, at one point in time, of all the patent applications that have been filed and still remain to be examined. The backlog was said to be 4.2 million worldwide in 2007, and in 2009 it reportedly continued to grow. The United States Patent and Trademark Office (USPTO) alone had a backlog of ca. 700,000 patent applications in 2009. By May 22, 2024 this number grew to 783,134 applications.

Although the overall economic effect of long patent examination time has not been reliably estimated, recent statistical studies found that patent grant delays have a stronger damaging effect on startups than on established companies. In particular, such delays reduce a startup's employment and sales growth, chances of survival, access to external capital, and future innovation. What is more surprising is that the delays also harm the growth, access to external capital, and follow-on innovation of the patentee's rivals.

== United States ==
=== Analysis ===
The USPTO experienced problems with a backlog of unexamined applications, a shortage of skilled examiners and loss of capable examiners to the better-paying private sector since its earliest days in the 1800s. As early as 1940s the backlog of unexamined patent applications, the shortage of examiners and insufficiency of the payments collected by the USPTO to cover its expenses were recognized as persistent USPTO's problems. On February 2, 1981, the U.S. News and World Report wrote: "The U.S. patent process is so sluggish, outdated and undependable that it is contributing to the decline of innovation in America."

Remarkably, between 1981 and 1989 "the USPTO met its commitment to reduce patent pendency (the time expended from patent application receipt to patent issue) to 18 months and became the world's fastest and most economical issuer of patents". However, since then the number of patent applications has been growing much faster (300 percent increase from 1989 to 2006) than the number of patent examiners, and by 2009 the patent pendency increased to 34.6 months.

The backlog has reached Borgesian proportions, and it feeds on itself: The patent examiner has less time to review more applications. Reviews become less rigorous. The easier the application process becomes, the more inventors apply.

According to former U.S. federal judge Paul R. Michel, in an interview conducted in 2011, "delay is [...] the greatest problem with the [U.S.] patent system" and "[the USPTO] desperately needs thousands of additional examiners and new IT systems. Indeed, it has needed them for years."

A high attrition rate among patent examiners also contributes to the backlog:

The resources-pinch that fee diversion puts on the USPTO requires examiners work at a feverish pace in processing applications. This undoubtedly contributes to the high rate of attrition seen at the USPTO... The USPTO, aside from just needing examiners, needs experienced examiners.

A study published in 2019 found that USPTO examiners spend on average only 19 hours on each patent application. This time includes reading it, searching prior art, comparing the two, writing office actions, replying to applicants' counter-arguments, and, often, conducting interviews with applicants and their attorneys. At the same time the voluminosity of (the number of words in) patent applications keeps increasing due to legislative and judicial changes that demand greater disclosure. A study of 10,000 patent applications filed with the USPTO in January 2002 found that the grant rate of individual examiners increases with the length of their tenure. More experienced examiners also cite fewer prior art references. Another study examined a sample of patent families that had applications allowed by the USPTO and rejected by the European Patent Office (EPO), and concluded that more experienced US examiners are more likely to allow such undeserving applications than novice examiners. It is noteworthy that issued US patents are very likely (94% in 2011) to have one or more claims invalidated during litigation. Also, the percentage of valid claims (among all USPTO-allowed claims in the litigated patents) is between 6 and 20%, depending on the litigation year.

A study published in 2021 disputed earlier findings that more experienced USPTO examiners are less scrupulous. Instead, the authors claim that more experienced examiners are more likely to use examiner's amendments, where the examiner writes her own claims that she is willing to allow, rather than simply rejecting the claims presented by the applicant. If the applicant accepts such examiner's amendments, the patent can be issued after the first Office action, thus reducing the patent pendency more than threefold. It has also been suggested that since junior examiners cannot allow claims without an approval by a supervisor, it is "safer and easier" for junior examiners to issue a rejection to meet their Office Action counts.

The backlog problem exists in many other patent offices, although usually it is less severe than at the USPTO. For example, Alison Brimelow, former president of the EPO, stated that the "backlog of patent applications is counter-productive to legal certainty, and that has a negative effect on the innovation process". According to a 2010 study by London School of Economics, "the cost to the global economy of the delay in processing patent applications may be as much as £7.65 billion each year."

=== Causes ===
Only a small number of studies looked into the causes of the patent backlog at the USPTO. In 2014 Frakes and Wasserman found that the examination fees paid by the applicants cover no more than 30% of the USPTO budget, since 1991 when the Agency became "almost entirely user-fee financed". In 2016 the USPTO estimated the average cost of examining a patent application at about $4,200. At the same time, the examination fee was only $1,600 for large entities; at $800 for small-entities status; and at $400 for micro-entities status. In comparison, for the same application with 20 claims (i.e., with undiscounted $1,600 examination fee at the USPTO) the European Patent Office would charge about $5,000, and the Japanese Patent Office would charge about $2,000.

In 2016 the USPTO collected ca. $880 million in patent examination fees, $274 million in patent issuance fees, $1,214 million in patent renewal fees, and $700 million in other fees such as late payment fees, extra claim fees, etc. Thus, examination fees account for only 30 percent of the Patent Office's budget, and they fail to cover its actual costs to examine the applications.

On top of this, the USPTO, as the only federal agency that actually generates revenue to be self-sufficient, has been a subject of fee diversion by the US Congress.

Instead of allowing the USPTO to keep and utilize all of the fees that it collects, Congress has, through its annual appropriations process, diverted significant amounts of money from the USPTO to other, unrelated federal programs." Between 1990 and 2011, "the Congress has diverted some $800 million USPTO fees... In April 2011, Congress announced appropriations for the remaining five months of FY2011 that would result in $100 million in USPTO fees being diverted to other federal programs".

The "back end" funding scheme (i.e., mostly from maintenance and issuance fees, rather than from "front end" examination fees) and the revenue diversion, creates a financial imbalance at the USPTO. In response to this challenge, more experienced examiners tend to spend less time on the examination, to cite fewer references, to allow (rather than reject) patent applications, and to extend preferential examination-queuing treatment to those technologies that cost the Agency the least to examine."

Nevertheless, the USPTO budget remains constrained, and does not allow for hiring more examiners to clear up the backlog.

=== Solutions ===
In their 2017 study, Frakes and Wasserman argued, that the patent backlog problem cannot be solved without increasing USPTO's revenues. More specifically, they proposed the following 3 changes:

1. increasing the upfront (filing and examination) fees (while abolishing or reducing issuance fees and keeping the current renewal fees). One version of this proposal would also eliminate or reduce small entity and micro-entity discounts.
2. limiting the number of repeat applications that applicants can file for the same invention and increasing fees for repeat examinations; and
3. increasing the time examiners spend reviewing patent applications.

The authors argued that:

Because the actual fees paid to the Patent Office for the examination of a patent application are a fraction of the overall cost of securing a patent (which includes attorney fees), there is reason to believe that even a two-fold or three-fold increase in examination fees will not substantially impede access to the U.S. patent system."

However, the authors also emphasized that implementation of these measures would require legislative changes by the US Congress.

In the meantime, the USPTO has been trying to implement alternative methods of expediting patent examination and of increasing its budget. The most effective USPTO practice of raising its revenues takes advantage of the lack of unity of invention definition in the US patent law, and of non-judicable nature of examiner's restriction requirement to split original application into numerous divisionals (each of these divisionals charges a separate set fees, even though the content(text) of each application in the family that the examiner reads is the same). Although the divisional splitting strategy does increase the USPTO's revenues, it also results in a longer prosecution times and a larger amount of work that examiners need to perform (e.g. to write a larger number of Office Actions). Therefore, it is not clear, if it is beneficial in terms of revenue per time.

Another (and much less effective in practice) approach comprises collaboration between different patent offices that examine applications from the same patent family. For example, Patent Prosecution Highway (PPH) was set up in 2006, in order to avoid the duplication of search and examination work. Also, several national patent offices, including USPTO, implemented programs for prioritized examination of patent applications in narrow categories or for patents applied by small firms. Some of these programs have been found to benefit small firms in terms of patent citations and quality; however, possibly because of a higher market value, such prioritized patents were found to be more likely litigated later.

However, many patent applicants can sometimes prefer a lengthy 'patent pending' period and the legal uncertainty that it brings. Also, since May 29, 2000, the USPTO has the policy to allow for a patent term extension beyond 20 years from the non-provisional priority date in cases when it takes the Office more than 3 years to issue a patent. Such policy encourages applicants not to use or demand accelerated examinations, as the term extension is added to the end of the patent life, i.e., when the patent is likely to be the most valuable (high sales are achieved).

== See also ==
- Patent prosecution
