= Non-binding opinion (United Kingdom patent law) =

UK law allowing people to enquire about the validity or infringement of a patent

In United Kingdom patent law, a non-binding opinion is a statutory right under sections 74A and 74B of the Patents Act 1977, which allows for any member of the public to make an enquiry into the validity or infringement of a patent and provide for review of such opinions. Since 2005, a new system has allowed the process to be reworked using new and updated forms under the Patents (Amendments) Rules 2005 (SI 2005/2496).

== Background ==
The United Kingdom Intellectual Property Office (UK IPO) operates a scheme where anyone can obtain an impartial examination of a patent from a senior examiner. The process involves an examination of the patent, as well as whether a particular product or process infringes on a patent.

The report is considered a non binding opinion, however, as it only provides guidance, and is used to avoid the litigation process and provides information to parties who are considering entering into patent litigation.

== Application process ==
In order to apply for a non binding opinion, the applicant has to fill out Patents Forms 2/77 (initiation of proceedings before the comptroller of patents), 17/77 (request for an opinion as to validity or infringement) and 49/77 (request to be informed of future events relating to a patent application or patent).

When making an application for a non binding opinion, applicants should consider the level of evidence they provide, as this allows for a stronger opinion to be formed. Furthermore, they should be aware that the owner of the patent, any licensees will be provided with any documents sent to form the opinion. The request for an opinion will also be advertised on the UK IPO's website so that any other party interested in the outcome may make observations concerning the patent.

== Recent application ==
The effectiveness of a non binding opinion was recently demonstrated in Weight Watchers (UK) Ltd and others v Love Bites Ltd and others [2012] EWPCC 11, 21 February 2012. The Weight Watchers organisation holds a registered trade mark to hold classes and sell people products for weight loss. From 2006, the defendants sold sandwiches under the trade mark Waist Watchers, which was subsequently registered. At a case management conference, the acting judge suggested that the parties should seek a preliminary non binding opinion as to the merits of the case. Both parties agreed to this, in an effort to keep costs down. On the evidence provided, the judge concluded that there was a strong case that Waist Watchers infringed on Weight Watchers under sections 10(2) and 10(3) of the Trade Mark Act and that the Waist Watchers marks were likely invalid. This decision demonstrates how effective non binding decisions can be at the Patents County Court.

== See also ==
- Certificate of contested validity
