= InsideCounsel =

American trade periodical for in-house legal professionals

- Cover of the January 2012 issue
- Categories: Monthly Business Periodical
- Frequency: Monthly
- Circulation: 40,000
- Publisher: Tom Duggan (Group Publisher)
- Founded: 1991
- Company: Summit Business Media
- Country: United States
- Based in: Chicago, Illinois
- Language: English
- Website: http://www.insidecounsel.com/

InsideCounsel magazine is a U.S.-based business-to-business monthly trade publication

== History and profile ==
Founded in 1991, InsideCounsel has since been targeting top in-house legal professionals. It was formerly named Corporate Legal Times.

The magazine's coverage includes benchmarking surveys, examinations of substantive legal issues, regional news, and a variety of columns and departments covering areas such as litigation, corporate governance, labor, and intellectual property. In 2007 the publisher of the magazine, Wicks Business Information, was acquired by Summit Business Media. The magazine is headquartered in Chicago, Illinois.

Cathleen Flahardy served as the editor-in-chief of the magazine. In September 2013 Erin Harrison was appointed to the post.

Circulation for InsideCounsel, audited by the BPA 6/10 40,000.
