= Opposition proceeding =

Procedure for challenging a patent

An opposition proceeding is an administrative process available under the patent and trademark law of many jurisdictions which allows third parties to formally challenge the validity of a pending patent application ("pre-grant opposition"), of a granted patent ("post-grant opposition"), or of a trademark.

== Patents ==
Patent opposition proceedings are administrative mechanisms within the patent law framework that allow third parties to formally challenge the validity of a pending patent application (pre-grant opposition) or a granted patent (post-grant opposition). These opposition proceedings serve as a crucial check within the patent system, ensuring that patents are granted only for inventions that genuinely meet all legal requirements, thereby maintaining the integrity and quality of the patent landscape.

== Trademarks ==
In the case of trademarks, third parties may use opposition proceedings to "oppose" the acceptance of a trademark application after it has been accepted and published for opposition purposes. If an opposition is defeated the trademark will proceed to registration. Some jurisdictions operate a "post-grant" opposition system, whereby opposition is not possible until after registration (e.g. Japan).

=== Canada ===
In Canada, any third party can file a statement of opposition to stop a trademark from being registered for at least one of the reasons set out in the Trademarks Act and Trademarks Regulations. A statement of opposition can only be filed during the two-month period after a trademark application is approved by the Canadian Intellectual Property Office (CIPO) and advertised in the Trademarks Journal. The trademark applicant and opponent then submit pleadings, evidence and arguments to the Trademarks Opposition Board (an administrative body within CIPO), which hears and makes decisions in opposition proceedings. The Board can either refuse the trademark application (in whole or in part) or reject the opposition. This decision can be appealed to the Federal Court of Canada by both the trademark applicant and opponent.

== See also ==
- Inter-partes review (IPR), a proceeding to challenge the patentability of one or more claims of a U.S. patent.
- Patent watch
- Post-grant review (PGR), a proceeding to challenge the patentability of one or more claims of a U.S. patent.
- Public participation in patent examination (including a discussion on the possibility, in some jurisdictions, for third parties to file observations during the examination of a patent application, see sub-section "Observations by third parties")
