= Public participation in patent examination =

Public participation in patent examination is used in some forms to identify relevant prior art and, more generally, to assess whether patent applications and inventions meet the patent law requirements, such as novelty, inventive step or non-obviousness, and sufficiency of disclosure.

== Rationale ==
The rationale for public participation in patent-application reviews is that knowledgeable people in fields relevant to a particular patent application will provide useful information to patent examiners if they have the right forum. One model for such a forum is a wiki model where the public may submit prior art and commentary relevant to a given patent application, and patent examiners can consult that forum. The intended effect is that patent examination will be more efficient and thorough, so the patents issued will be higher quality than is currently possible.

== History ==
In the 17th and 18th centuries, patent examination in France for novelty and utility was performed by the private French Academy under commission from the French government. The Academy sought the input of outside experts in the specific fields of the inventions. Galileo, for example, was consulted when a patent was applied for regarding a new method of determining longitude according to the position of the moon. Galileo's conclusion is that the method would work in principle, but the measuring techniques are not accurate enough to provide meaningful results; therefore, the patent was denied.

== Legal constraints ==
=== United States ===
In the United States, the third parties may not provide commentary or opinions directly to a patent examiner during the prosecution of a patent unless the patent applicant gives the examiner written permission to do so. Rule 99, which previously allowed a member of the public to submit prior art to an examiner within two months of an application publication, has been repealed by the AIA. Rules 290 (37 CFR 1.290) and 35 USC 122(e) control the submission of prior-art references by third parties after the publication of an application and before the issuance of the patent. The cited prior-art references must be dated at least six months from the date of the publication, the first rejection of any claim, or the notice of allowance.

=== China ===
The Chinese Communist Party Central Committee General Office issued policy framework opinion in 2019 declaring that public participation in patent matters is to be effectuated by people’s congresses, and to use a system of political consultative conferences to achieve “democratic oversight.” This is a specific extension of Article 1 of the Constitution of the People’s Republic of China to the fundamental principles of China patent law.

In practice, in comparison to Europe, where Article 115 of the European Patent Convention allows third parties to present observations that examiners must consider, China provides no equivalent channel for public participation in patent examination. China’s patent examiners answer to the ultimate authority of the Chinese Communist Party, which constitutionally represents the public. While members of the public in Europe may act independently to represent the public interest, the public (People) in China can only be legitimately represented by the Communist Party. Thus, adopting a system similar to Article 115 EPC would be fundamentally incompatible with the organic law of China.

The China National Intellectual Property Administration will therefore hear and be informed by members of the public, but will not respond or acknowledge the observations.

== History ==
=== Observations by third parties ===
The European Patent Convention (EPC) provides for that any person may submit observations concerning the patentability of an invention described in a European patent application. This is a form of public participation to patent examination. Filing observations by third parties at the European Patent Office (EPO) is free of charge, but the observations must include a statement of grounds. The statement of grounds must be in English, French or German. The person filing the observations does not become party to the proceedings.

In the United States Patent and Trademark Office (USPTO), third parties may submit prior art relevant to a published patent application within two months of said publication or before a notice of allowance is given, whichever comes first. In contrast to European practice, however, third parties are not allowed to provide any additional explanation of the relevance of the prior art. The USPTO requires a fee.

In Australia, any person can file observations (by reference to prior art) in regard to the novelty or inventive step (i.e. non-obviousness) of a pending patent application. Those observations can be filed at any time between the complete specification being published (i.e. becoming open for public inspection) and three months after the advertisement of acceptance of the patent (which is a precursor to the patent being granted). This gives the public at large an opportunity to draw to the examiner’s attention to prior art references that he or she might not have considered during examination.

In July 2012, a third-party observation system was also introduced for Patent Cooperation Treaty (PCT) applications. The observations have to relate to novelty and inventive step, and they may be submitted anonymously. The observations can be made at any time from the publication of the PCT application until the expiration of 28 months from the priority date. No fee is due for filing the observations.

=== Wiki review ===
The review of patent and patent applications through wiki projects was proposed in 2005 by patent attorney J. Matthew Buchanan on his blog. A subsequent proposal was made in Fortune magazine in 2006. The claimed purpose is the improvement of the quality of the patent examination, as well as any re-examinations, through the involvement of the public, to help identify any relevant prior art. The USPTO has endorsed some of these projects.

According to Dave Kappos, former vice president for intellectual-property law at IBM, and later head of the USPTO, "it's a very powerful concept because it leverages the enormous capabilities of the entire world of technical talent."

Wikipedia itself has been used by the U.S. patent examiners as a reference to get a "quick outline of an unfamiliar topic". Citations of Wikipedia as prior art, however, are not allowed in the U.S. due to the fluid and open nature of its editing. Nonetheless, in the related area of trademark examination, entries from Wikipedia have been cited in precedential opinions by the Trademark Trial and Appeal Board of the USPTO.

==== Blackboard patent ====
Wikipedia has also been used to collect early references related to controversial patents. History of virtual learning environments, for example, is an article that was created primarily to list prior art that would potentially invalidate U.S. patent 6,988,138, "Internet-based education support system and methods". This patent issued to Blackboard Inc. in June 2000. The Moodle wiki has a similar page. Once the patent was issued, Blackboard Inc. sued its competitor Desire2Learn to stop them from infringing the patent. In July 2009, the Court of Appeals for the Federal Circuit held that all of the claims of the Blackboard patent were invalid either for being too vague or for being already in practice before Blackboard filed their application. Blackboard, however, has four continuation applications pending where it can correct the deficiencies in its claims and get new patents to issue.

While the lawsuit was moving forward, the Software Freedom Law Center filed for a reexamination citing that new prior art had been discovered that raised a substantial new question of validity. The USPTO agreed and the patent is currently undergoing reexamination.

== USPTO community patent review (Peer to Patent) ==
On June 15, 2007, the United States Patent and Trademark Office began a two-year pilot community patent review called Peer to patent or Community Patent Review. The program organizers anticipate having 250 pending software patent applications reviewed by members of the interested public. They can submit prior art along with commentary and vote on the most relevant prior art. Four months after a patent application is posted the most relevant prior art is provided to the patent examiner.

In the first five months of the program, over 20 applications have been opened to the public and 8 have completed reviews. Over 28,000 site visits have been recorded. 1,600 reviewers from more than 100 different countries have registered. Over one hundred thirty potential prior art references have been submitted. General Electric, Hewlett-Packard, IBM, Intel, and Oracle Corporation each have volunteered some of their pending patent applications for review.

Patent examiners will have access to the commentary and will consider it in their examination. Applications that are part of the pilot program will get accelerated examination.

Of the first 19 office actions received by Peer-to-Patent applications, 5 cited the prior art submitted by reviewers.

A new pilot started on October 25, 2010, and will continue until September 30, 2011.

== IP.Com PatentDebate ==
IP.com PatentDebate is a blog-type Website were the public can comment on all pending published U.S. patent applications. User registration is required. Unlike Peer to Patent, however, there is no formal relationship between the USPTO and PatentDebate. The site is sponsored at least in part by advertising.

== Post issuance review ==
=== Article One Partners ===
Article One Partners provides a community review format for enlisting members of the public to search for prior art for already issued patents. These patents are generally the subject of ongoing litigation. Anyone who signs up can earn cash rewards if they submit the most relevant prior art. Additionally, members can earn profit-sharing points for activities such as referring friends. The profit-sharing points earn them cash rewards. Article One Partners was recognized as "2009 Startup of the Year" by Silicon Alley Insider.

=== BountyQuest project ===
The now defunct BountyQuest was an early attempt to recruit members of the public to search for prior art for issued patents. Bounties were offered by companies for any prior art that someone could find that would invalidate the claims of a given US patent. BountyQuest existed from 2000 to 2003.

=== PatentFizz ===
PatentFizz provides a forum for commenting on issued patents and provides a simplified view of patents.

=== Patexia ===
Patexia is a patent research company that provides patent valuation services to companies with intellectual property portfolios by crowdsourcing the search problem to technical and scientific subject-matter experts. Patexia provides a free online search engine capable of searching patents and patent litigation by patent number, company, or keyword; an online news aggregator on innovation and IP topics; a contest platform with prizes for crowdsourced patent research; and a freelance marketplace to connect its subject-matter experts to businesses for direct consultation to solve technical problems for clients.

== See also ==
- Backlog of unexamined patent applications
- Internet as a source of prior art
- Opposition proceeding
  - Opposition procedure before the European Patent Office, European procedure for public to challenge validity of patents after they issue
- Patent Prosecution Highway (PPH), a set of cooperation agreements between some patent offices, notably for accelerating patent prosecution
- Reexamination, US procedure for public to challenge validity of patents after they issue.
