= Patent pending =

As yet ungranted patent application

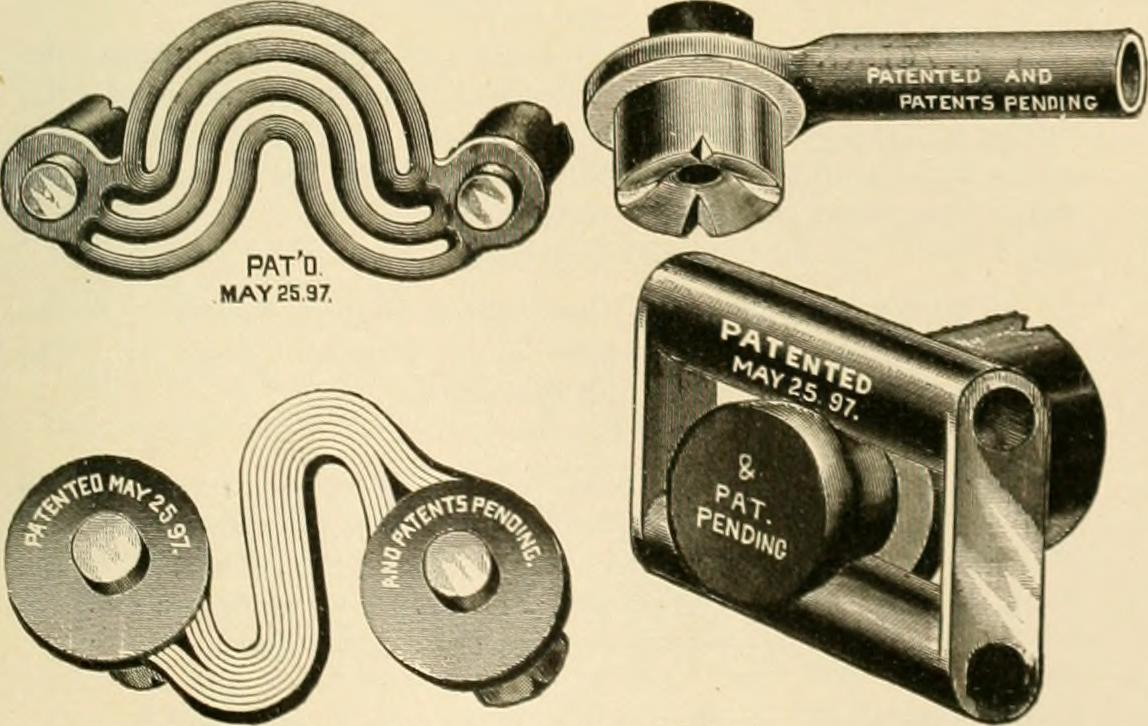
Hardware marked "Patented" and "Pat. Pending"

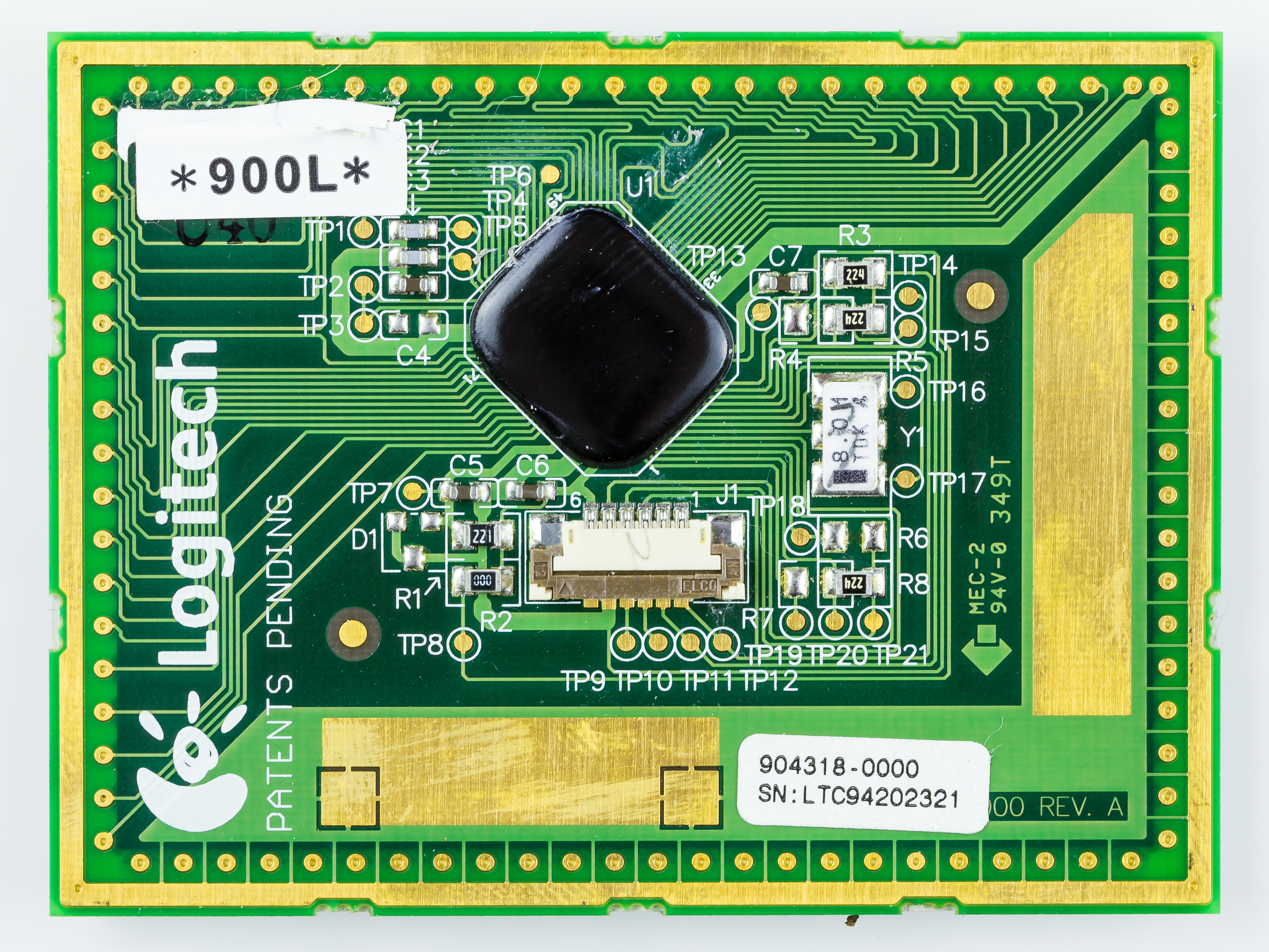
Printed circuit board by Logitech with inscription "Patents pending"

"Patent pending" (sometimes abbreviated by "pat. pend." or "pat. pending") or "patent applied for" are legal designations or expressions that can be used in relation to a product or process once a patent application for the product or process has been filed, but prior to the patent being issued or the application abandoned. The marking serves as a warning to the public, business, or potential infringers who would copy the invention that they may be liable for damages (including back-dated royalties), seizure, and injunction once a patent is issued.

Usage of the designation “patent pending” does not differentiate between examined and unexamined applications, nor between pending provisional applications and pending non-provisional applications. As a result, third parties may be unable to assess whether a pending application has undergone any substantive review or whether its claims are likely to mature into enforceable patent rights. The uniform usage of the designation across different procedural stages can obscure meaningful differences in legal posture associated with various types of patent filings. The “patent pending” designation also does not provide information about the scope, breadth, or validity of any claims that may ultimately issue. Because claims are typically amended during examination, third parties cannot reliably determine what subject matter may eventually be protected based solely on a pending application. This uncertainty can contribute to both overestimation and underestimation of the legal significance of “patent pending” status.

Fraudulent use of a patent pending designation is prohibited by the law of many countries and inventors should be cautious when marking products or methods that may arguably not be covered by any pending patent application. In some jurisdictions, such as the United Kingdom, a warning notice should ideally mention the number of the pending application.

== Legislation ==
=== Australia ===
In Australia, according to IP Australia, the term "patent pending" refers to an invention in respect of which a patent application has been filed at the patent office but for which a patent has not necessarily been granted. The marking of an article has a legal effect under Section 123 of the Patents Act 1990 with the result that a defendant is taken to be aware of the existence of patent rights.

In Australia, the preferred marking is "Aust. Pat. App. No. yyyynnnnnn" where "yyyy" is the four-digit year of the application and "nnnnnn" is the six-digit number allocated by the Australian Patent Office.

There are penalties for making a false indication of the existence of patent rights for any invention.

=== United States ===
In the United States, according to the United States Patent and Trademark Office, the expression "patent pending" as such does not protect an invention until the actual patent is published and/or issued:

A patentee who makes or sells patented articles, or a person who does so for or under the patentee is required to mark the articles with the word "Patent" and the number of the patent. The penalty for failure to mark is that the patentee may not recover damages from an infringer unless the infringer was duly notified of the infringement and continued to infringe after the notice.

The marking of an article as patented when it is not in fact patented is against the law and subjects the offender to a penalty. Some persons mark articles sold with the terms "Patent Applied For" or "Patent Pending". These phrases have no legal effect, but only give information that an application for patent has been filed in the Patent and Trademark Office. The protection afforded by a patent does not start until the actual grant of the patent. False use of these phrases or their equivalent is prohibited.

The use of the term "patent pending" or "patent applied for" is permitted so long as a patent application has actually been filed and is pending, i.e., has not been issued as a patent or become abandoned. If these terms are used for the purpose of deceiving the public when no patent application has been filed, or when the application is not pending, a fine of up to $500 may be imposed for every such offense. Under the Forest Group, Inc. v. Bon Tool Co., 590 F.3d 1295 (Fed. Cir. 2009) decision, the current interpretation of "offense" holds that each mis-marked article constitutes an offense, which permits theoretical damages in the hundreds of millions of dollars for high-volume consumer goods. The Leahy-Smith America Invents Act revised section 292 to say that only the United States may sue for that penalty but that a person who has suffered a competitive injury may sue for recovery of damages adequate to compensate for the injury.

A provisional application, like any other patent application, also allows the applicant to use the term "patent pending".

== In popular culture ==
Numerous characters have assumed the name Pat Pending since at least the 1960s, notably Professor Pat Pending of cartoon series Wacky Races; the name has appeared in at least 21 comics as well as the original Batman series, where J. Pat O'Malley played a prolific and rich yet cheap inventor "Pat Pending" in two episodes, likely capitalizing on the marking present on goods throughout the United States.

== See also ==
- Backlog of unexamined patent applications
- Provisional rights
