= Prior art =

Concept in patent law

The prior art, also known as state of the art or background art, is a concept in patent law used to determine the patentability of an invention. In most systems of patent law, the prior art encompasses anything that was made available to the public before the effective filing date of a patent application for an invention. Differences exist in how prior art is defined under different national, regional, and international patent systems.

The prior art is evaluated by patent offices as part of the patent granting process in what is called "substantive examination" of a patent application in order to determine whether an invention claimed in the patent application meets the novelty and inventive step or non-obviousness criteria for patentability. It may also be considered by patent offices or courts in opposition or invalidity proceedings.

Patent offices often perform prior art searches during the patent granting procedure to identify relevant prior art. Certain patent offices also rely on the patent search results obtained by other patent offices or cooperate with other patent offices to identify relevant prior art. Prior art may also be submitted by the public for consideration in examination or in opposition or invalidity proceedings. Relevant prior art identified by patent offices or patent applicants are often cited by patent applicants in patent applications and by patent offices in patent search reports.

== Defining prior art ==
Prior art may comprise information that is disclosed to the public in written form, oral form, or by use. Sources of disclosure in written form may include published patents or patent applications or scientific and technical books and journals. Unpublished patent applications may also be considered prior art under certain circumstances, for example where an unpublished patent application was filed at the same patent office before the effective filing date of the patent application in question.

To anticipate the subject-matter of a patent claim, prior art is generally expected to provide a description sufficient to inform an average worker in the field (or the person skilled in the art) of some subject matter falling within the scope of the claim. Prior art must be available in some way to the public, and in many countries, the information needs to be recorded in a fixed form somehow.

=== Specific cases ===
Traditional knowledge, such as traditional medicine, may be considered prior art. Information covered by non-disclosure agreements or similar may not be considered to have been disclosed to the public and thus not prior art.

If an invention has been described in the prior art or would have been obvious from what has been described in the prior art, a patent on that invention is not valid.

Information kept secret, for instance, as a trade secret, is not usually prior art, provided that employees and others with access to the information are under a non-disclosure obligation. With such an obligation, the information is typically not regarded as prior art. Therefore, a patent may be granted on an invention, even though someone else already knew of the invention. A person who used an invention in secret may in some jurisdictions be able to claim "prior user rights" and thereby gain the right to continue using the invention. As a special exception, earlier-filed and unpublished patent applications do qualify as prior art as of their filing date in certain circumstances.

Prior art generally does not include unpublished work or mere conversations (though, according to the European Patent Convention, oral disclosures also form prior art—see Article 54(2) EPC).

== Effective date of patents and patent applications as prior art ==
It is typical for a patent office to treat its own patents and published patent applications as prior art as of their filing dates, although under the European Patent Convention, this applies only to novelty rather than inventive step. However, United States patent law before the Leahy-Smith America Invents Act (AIA) included the Hilmer doctrine, under which United States patents and patent application publications were prior art only as of their earliest effective United States filing dates, i.e., disregarding any foreign priority claimed in those patents and patent application publications. The AIA has abolished the Hilmer doctrine and makes United States patents and patent application publications that name another inventor prior art as of when they were "effectively filed."

== Usage in litigation ==
Arguments claiming prior art are used in defending and attacking patent validity. In one U.S. case on the issue, the court said:

One attacking the validity of a patent must present clear and convincing evidence establishing facts that lead to the legal conclusion of invalidity. 35 U.S.C. § 282. To establish invalidity under 35 U.S.C. § 103, certain factual predicates are required before the legal conclusion of obviousness or nonobviousness can be reached. The underlying factual determinations to be made are

- (1) the scope and content of the prior art;
- (2) the differences between the claimed invention and the prior art;
- (3) the level of ordinary skill in the art; and
- (4) objective evidence of non-obviousness, such as commercial success, long-felt but unsolved need, failure of others, copying, and unexpected results.

— Graham v. John Deere Co., 383 U.S. 1, 17, 148 USPQ 459, 467 (1966).

== Prior art searches ==
Patent offices deal with prior art searches in the context of the patent granting procedure. A patent search is frequently carried out by patent offices or patent applicants in order to identify relevant prior art. Certain patent offices may also rely on the patent search results of other patent offices or cooperate with other patent offices in order to identify relevant prior art. Prior art may also be submitted by the public for consideration in examination or in opposition or invalidity proceedings. Relevant prior art identified by patent offices or patent applicants are often cited by patent applicants in patent applications and by patent offices in patent search reports.

=== Types of prior art searches ===
==== Novelty ====
A "novelty search" is a prior art search that is often conducted by patent attorneys, patent agents or professional patent searchers before a patent application is filed. A novelty search helps an inventor determine if the invention is novel before committing the resources necessary to obtain a patent. The search may include searching in databases of patents, patent applications and other documents such as utility models and in the scientific literature. Novelty searches can also be used to help an inventor determine what is unique about their invention. Anything not found in the prior art can be potentially patentable. Thomas Edison, for example, did not get a patent on the basic concept of the light bulb. It was already patented and therefore forms part of the prior art. Instead, Edison got a patent on his improvements to the light bulb. These improvements included a very thin filament and a reliable technique for joining the white hot filament to the room temperature lead wires.

A novelty search is also conducted by patent examiners during prosecution of the patent application. For instance, examiner's search guidelines applicable to the United States are found in the U.S. Manual of Patent Examining Procedure (MPEP) 904.02 General Search Guidelines, Prior Art, Classification, and Search.

==== Validity ====
A "validity search" is a prior art search done after a patent issues. The purpose of a validity (or invalidity) search is to find prior art that the patent examiner overlooked so that a patent can be declared invalid. This might be done by an entity infringing, or potentially infringing, the patent, or it might be done by a patent owner or other entity that has a financial stake in a patent to confirm the validity of a patent. Crowdsourcing, where a large number of interested people search for prior art, may be effective where references would otherwise be difficult to find.

==== Clearance ====
A clearance search is a search of issued patents to assess whether a given product or process violates someone else's existing patent. If so, then a validity search may be done to try to find prior art that would invalidate the patent. A clearance search is a search targeting patents being in force and may be limited to a particular country and group of countries, or a specific market.

=== Notable prior art databases ===
- DEPATISnet – Public patent database made available by the German Patent and Trademark Office, serving as official publication source for German patents and patent applications and covering numerous other national and regional patent collections
- Espacenet—European Patent Office public patent literature database, with patents from many patent offices.
- Google Patents—public search engine from Google that indexes patents from the United States Patent and Trademark Office (USPTO) and other international patent offices, and machine-CPC-classified non-patent literature from Google Scholar.
- PATENTSCOPE – the PATENTSCOPE public patent database provided by the World Intellectual Property Organization (WIPO) serves as official publication source for patent applications filed under the Patent Cooperation Treaty and covering numerous national and regional patent collections.
- Patent Register Portal provides online patent hosts registers, gazettes, and legal-status-related information from over 200 jurisdictions and patent information collections.

The Internet Archive Wayback Machine is recognized by the USPTO as a valid source of prior art on the Internet, though generally the date of archiving is considered the first published date, rather than the date on any documents that have been archived.

== Duty of disclosure ==
In the United States, inventors and their patent agents or attorneys are required by law to submit any references they are aware of to the United States Patent and Trademark Office that may be material to the patentability of the claims in a patent application they have filed. The patent examiner will then determine if the references qualify as "prior art" and may then take them into account when examining the patent application. If a person having a duty to disclose, acting with deceptive intent, fails to properly disclose the material references of which they are aware, then a patent can be found unenforceable for inequitable conduct.

Japan also has a duty of disclosure.

Australia has abolished its duty of disclosure with regard to the results of documentary searches by, or on behalf of, foreign patent offices, except where:

- (a) normal exam was requested before April 22, 2007,
- (b) the foreign patent office search issued before April 22, 2007, and
- (c) acceptance (allowance) was officially advertised before July 22, 2007.

== Public participation in patent examination ==
With the advent of the Internet, a number of initiatives have been undertaken to create a forum where the public at large can participate in prior art searches. These forums have been related to both issued patents and pending patent applications.

=== Pending patent applications ===
More recently, different attempts to employ open Internet-based discussions for encouraging public participation commenting on pending U.S. applications have been started. These may take the form of a wiki:

- Peer-to-patent online system for open, community patent review.
- patents@stackexchange. A Q&A site for people interested in improving and participating in the patent system.

Patent examiners often use the online encyclopedia Wikipedia as a reference to get an overall feel for a given subject. Citations of Wikipedia as actual prior art can be problematic, however, due to the fluid and open nature of its editing, and Patents Commissioner Doll said the agency used Wikipedia entries as background and not as a basis for accepting or rejecting an application.

== See also ==
- Defensive publication
- Illegal number, illegal prime
- Information disclosure statement (IDS)
- Internet as a source of prior art
- Micropatent
- Non-binding opinion (United Kingdom patent law)
- Patent classification
- Patent watch
- Priority right
- Public participation in patent examination
