= Intellectual property analytics =

Intellectual property analytics (commonly IP analytics) is the systematic analysis of data from intellectual property rights, including patents, trademarks, industrial designs, copyrights, geographical indications, and trade secrets, to produce actionable insights for policymakers, businesses, researchers, and legal practitioners. Originating in patent analytics, the field has expanded to integrate multiple IP domains and combines rigorous data preparation with techniques such as bibliometrics, text mining, machine learning, geospatial mapping, and visualization to create technology landscapes, monitor brand activity, assess portfolios and inform policy. Typical workflows progress from project scoping through data acquisition, cleaning, and normalization to analysis, storytelling, and dissemination, using both public and commercial databases and tools. Some advances in artificial intelligence have broadened analytical capabilities while raising legal and ethical questions about authorship, inventorship, and liability, driving evolving methodological standards and regulatory debate.

== Context ==
The emergence of IP analytics as a distinct field has been driven in part by the unprecedented availability of machine-readable data from global IP offices, scholarly databases, and open-source tools. According to WIPO’s Patent Analytics Handbook, patent analytics now routinely involves scientific literature integration, text mining, machine learning, and geographic mapping for strategic insight generation. The field has evolved from early spreadsheet analyses to sophisticated pipelines that leverage APIs, geocoding, and AI for technology mapping and forecasting, including automated systems for patent document summarization using natural language processing and machine learning for enhanced knowledge management.

As reported in IP Facts and Figures 2024, global filings for patents, trademarks, and industrial designs reached new highs in 2023, with over 3.5 million patent applications, 1.52 million industrial designs, and approximately 15 million trademark class-based filings. Intellectual property data are also used for tools such as USPTO’s PatentsView, which links and disambiguates information about inventors, organizations, and patent filings and applies algorithms such as gender attribution to the data.

Academic literature has chronicled the growing convergence of patent landscape analysis with data science and AI methods. Patent analytics is now understood to encompass not only counts and citation graphs, but also semantic clustering, named entity recognition, and predictive modeling, as described in peer-reviewed studies.

While the initial focus of IP analytics was on patents, recent developments in trademark and design analytics—arguably driven by similar data-intensive techniques—underscore a broader shift toward integrated analysis across IP rights. This expansion enables strategic comparisons across patent, trademark, industrial design, and other IP domains for portfolio management, commercialization strategy, and policy formulation. While offering immense opportunities for advanced analytics, the rapid emergence of generative AI also presents complex challenges to traditional intellectual property notions of authorship, inventorship, and infringement liability, necessitating evolving legal and ethical frameworks.

== The main intellectual property domains ==
=== Patent analytics ===
Patent analytics is a specialized domain within IP analytics that extracts insights from patent documents to inform decisions in research and development, technology management, policymaking, and competitive intelligence. A patent contains structured information such as technical disclosures, legal claims, bibliographic data (inventors, applicants, jurisdictions), classifications, and citation relationships. Because patents are often filed before commercial products are launched, they serve as early indicators of innovation trajectories.

Patent analytics supports:

- Technology landscaping, identifying emerging fields, convergence zones, and innovation cycles, as annually detailed in comprehensive reports from major patent offices outlining key technological shifts and leading sectors;
- Portfolio management, including benchmarking, white space analysis, and IP strategy alignment;
- Patent valuation can provide indicators used in the assessment of patent portfolios and, in some contexts, as inputs to patent valuation, such as forward citations, patent family size, grant status, and opposition records;
- Policy analysis, assessing national and regional innovation systems;
- Academic studies, tracing the science-technology linkage and knowledge diffusion.

=== Trademark analytics ===
Trademark analytics examines trademark registrations and applications to gain insights into branding strategies, market dynamics, and product trends. WIPO's Global Brand Database and annual World Intellectual Property Indicators reports provide large-scale trademark data across Nice classifications, jurisdictions, and time periods.

Trademark analytics can be used to:

- Monitor brand activity in specific sectors or regions;
- Detect filing surges, signaling new market entrants or rebranding trends;
- Identify potential infringement or conflicts, using similarity algorithms;
- Support market entry analysis, evaluating competitor strategies, including the analysis of trademark families and their market value implications.

The increase in cross-border commerce and e-commerce platforms has enhanced the strategic use of trademark data for global brand monitoring.

=== Industrial design analytics ===
Industrial design analytics focuses on the appearance of products, as protected under registered designs. It relies on visual and classification data derived from systems such as the Hague System and the Locarno Classification. WIPO's Global Design Database facilitates international and regional design searches.

Applications include:

- Trend spotting in product aesthetics, especially in design-intensive sectors like consumer electronics, fashion, or automotive;
- Monitoring design registrations by competitors or markets;
- Tracking geographical diffusion, via design filings across jurisdictions.

Design analytics remains more specialized due to the visual nature of data and limitations in text-based querying. Nonetheless, design filing trends provide valuable insight into innovation in product form and appearance. Recent methodological advances are beginning to overcome data challenges, using computer vision and AI to enable large-scale analysis of design aesthetics and trends, including deep learning techniques for image-based trademark similarity detection, and artificial intelligence is also increasingly shaping the entire industrial design process, from concept generation to optimization, presenting both significant opportunities and new challenges.

=== Other IP analytics ===
IP analytics may also extend to other forms of protection, such as geographical indications (GIs), plant variety protections, or copyright registrations where available. For instance, WIPO's Lisbon System and annual IP statistics include GI filings, while plant variety databases offer insight into agricultural innovation. However, these forms are less standardized globally, and lack the robust analytical infrastructure of patents or trademarks.

== IP analytics methodology ==
The analytical process in IP analytics typically follows a structured methodology, as described in WIPO's guidelines for patent analytics.

This six-stage process is applicable across patent, trademark, and design analysis:

- Defining the topic and project scope, the technology, sector, or legal issue to be analyzed. Scope may be limited by timeframe, geography, or classification systems (e.g., International Patent Classification, Nice classification, Locarno classification).
- IP search and data retrieval from relevant databases to collect intellectual property records. This may involve using structured fields, keywords, classifications, or citation links. Tools include WIPO's Patentscope, Global Brand Database, Global Design Database, and EPO's Espacenet and PATSTAT.
- Data cleaning and normalization to ensure data quality by removing duplicates, harmonizing applicant names, assigning missing classifications, and aligning with international standards. This is essential for producing reliable visualizations and statistics.
- Data analysis and visualization with the use of bibliometric, network, statistical, and machine learning methods to derive insights. Common approaches include: time-series analysis, citation and co-classification networks, geographic heat maps or applicant or inventor ranking
- Interpretation and reporting of the results in the context of the research question. It combines visuals with clear text to communicate insights effectively to stakeholders, policymakers, industry, or legal experts.
- Dissemination and distribution by publishing findings through reports, dashboards, academic papers, internal briefings, interactive platforms or open datasets.
