= Global Brand Database =

Online database of trademarks

- Website type: Computer-assisted legal research
- Available in: Arabic, Chinese, English, French, Russian, Spanish
- Owner: World Intellectual Property Organization
- Website: branddb.wipo.int
- Commercial: No
- Registration: No registration
- Current status: Online

The Global Brand Database is an online trademark database developed and maintained by the World Intellectual Property Organization. It provides access to trademark records from the Madrid System together with trademark collections made available by participating national and regional intellectual property offices. The database supports searches using bibliographic information, trademark classifications and image similarity tools.

== History ==
The Global Brand Database was launched in 2011. It was designed to provide a single platform for searching and retrieving trademark records from various national and international databases. It rapidly hosted 10 million records. In 2017, the database covered 30 millions entries. Over the following years, the database continued to evolve and expand its functionalities to meet the growing demands of trademark users.

In 2019, WIPO announced that the database could be used to search for figurative marks based on new artificial Intelligence technology.

As of April 2026, the Global Brand Database gave access to more than 75.9 million records from 89 national and regional trademark authorities, in addition to WIPO-administered international trademark collections.

== Content ==
The database includes trademark records registered through the Madrid System for the International Registration of Mark, as well as collections contributed by participating national and regional offices. It covers the emblems under 6ter and the geographical indications under Lisbon Express Database, International Nonproprietary Names from WHO, the EUIPO collection. Depending on the source collection, records may include word marks, figurative marks, owner information, Nice Classification data, application and registration numbers, and legal status information.

== Search ==
The database supports several search methods, including keyword searches, searches by owner name, trademark number, Nice Classification, Vienna Classification codes and designated jurisdiction. Advanced search options allow users to combine multiple search criteria and filter results by office, status, date and other bibliographic fields. Users can browse visually similar marks or upload an image to identify comparable trademarks. Image similarity searching relies on computer vision techniques to retrieve marks with comparable visual characteristics. Search results can be viewed individually or exported for further analysis.

== See also ==
- Patentscope
- Global Design Database
- WIPO Lex
