= World Intellectual Property Report =

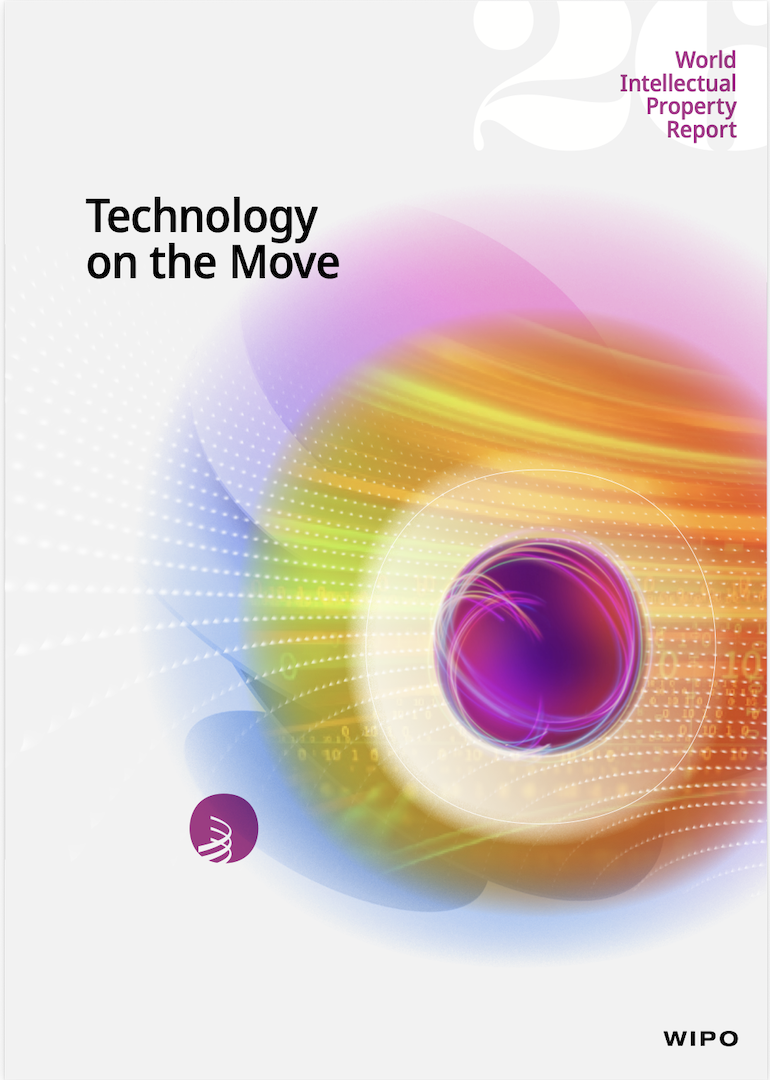
- WIPR 2026 Cover
- Discipline: Innovation Economics
- Language: English, French, Spanish, Arabic, Chinese, Russian

Publication details
- History: 2011–present
- Publisher: World Intellectual Property Organization
- Frequency: Biennially
- Open access: Yes
- License: CC BY 4.0

Standard abbreviations
- ISO 4: World Intellect. Prop. Rep.

Indexing
- ISSN: 2790-9883 (print); 2790-9891 (web)

Links
- wipo.int/wipr

The World Intellectual Property Report (WIPR) is a biennial analytical publication by the World Intellectual Property Organization, an agency of the United Nations. Each report examines a different theme, focusing on trends in a particular area of intellectual property and innovation. The report uses macroeconomic analysis and includes case studies to examine the role of intellectual property and other intangibles in the global economy.

Digital versions are available on open access.

== History ==
The report was first published in 2011 under the direction of Francis Gurry with the objective of providing evidence of the role of innovation for the economies of all United Nations member states. Ever since, it has been prepared and coordinated by WIPO's Economics and Statistics Division, led by Carsten Fink.

== Themes ==
The WIPR covers a theme related to intellectual property and innovation. The report draws on commissioned background papers from specialized economists. The content of the report typically includes case studies, innovation and industrial policy reviews and IP trends.

=== 2026: Technology on the Move ===
Technology on the Move was released on February 17, 2026. This issue of the report analyzes how new technologies are spreading across borders at unprecedented pace and gaps are narrowing in how intensively countries are using the innovations. The report highlights the role of policymakers, who must focus on promoting invention as well as ensuring diffusion.

Following the methodoly adopted in 2024 edition, the 2026 report offers three case studies on agriculture, clean technologies and digital technologies.

Main contributors: Carsten Fink, Maria de las Mercedes Menéndez, Julio Raffo, Catalina Martinez, Ernest Miguelez, Michele Pezzoni, Reinhilde Veugelers, Fabiana Visentin, Jose Falck-Zepeda,Charles de Grazia, Nicholas Rada, Gregory Graff, Eugenie Dugoua, Joëlle Noailly and Joël Cariolle.

=== 2024: Making Innovation Policy Work for Growth and Development ===
Making Innovation Policy Work for Growth and Development was released on May 2, 2024. It analyzes the intersection of human innovation, economic diversification and industrial policy and proposes that development of local innovation capabilities is the key to sustainable growth for countries.

Different from past editions of the report, this issue offers a new methodological framework and three case studies on agriculture technology, motorcycles and video games.

Main Contributors: Ricardo Hausmann (John F. Kennedy School of Government, Harvard University), Muhammed A. Yildirim, Christian Chacua, Matte Hartog y Shreyas Gadgin Matha, Gregory D. Graf, Paolo Aversa (King's College London), Hakan Özalp (Amsterdam Business School).

=== 2022: The Direction of Innovation ===
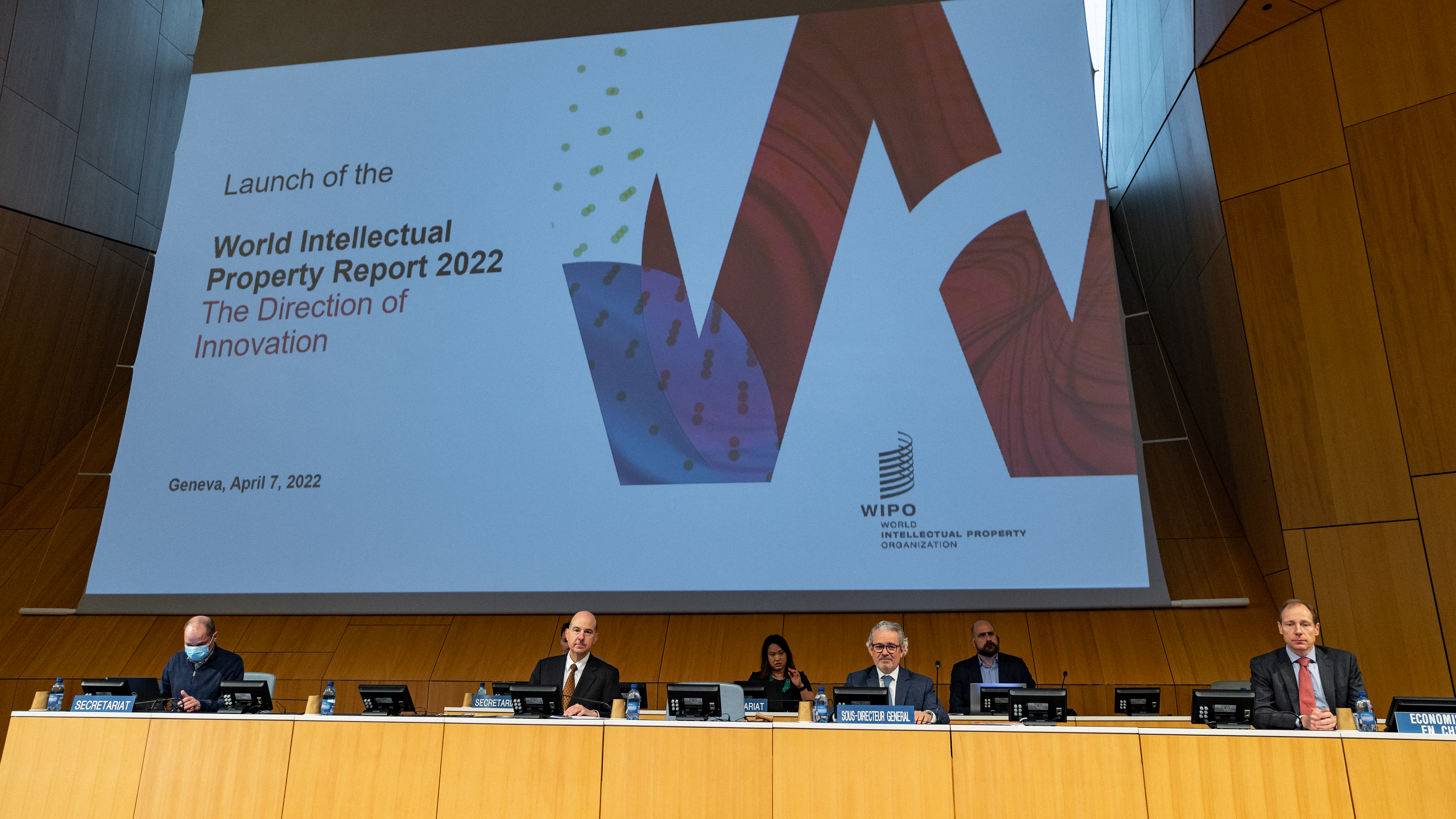
View of the launch event for the World Intellectual Property Report 2022. Taking place both physically at WIPO in Geneva and online, the launch event included a presentation of key findings of the Report, a panel discussion – “Are we at a crossroads of major changes in the direction of innovation?” – and an open-floor discussion.

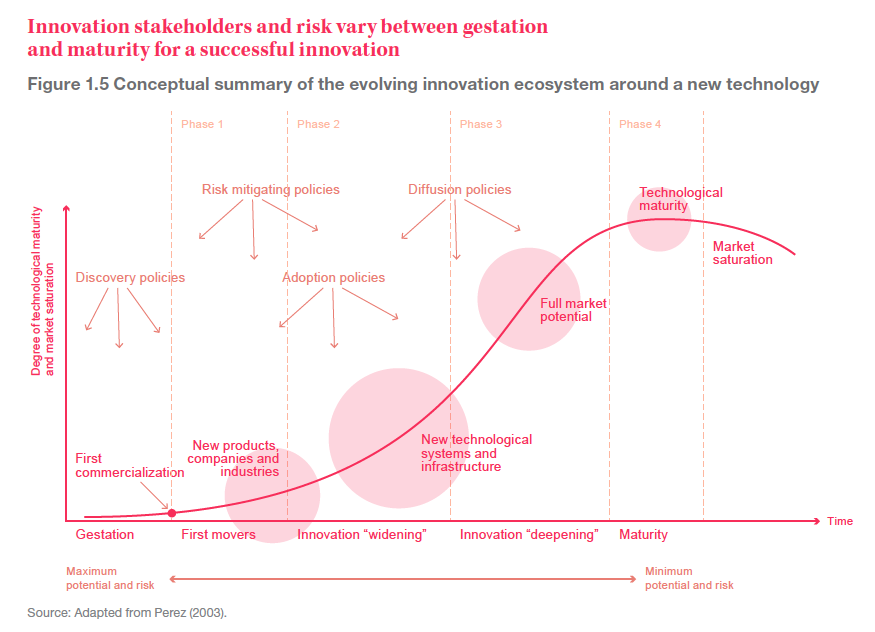
Conceptual summary of the evolving innovation ecosystem around a new technology - report 2022

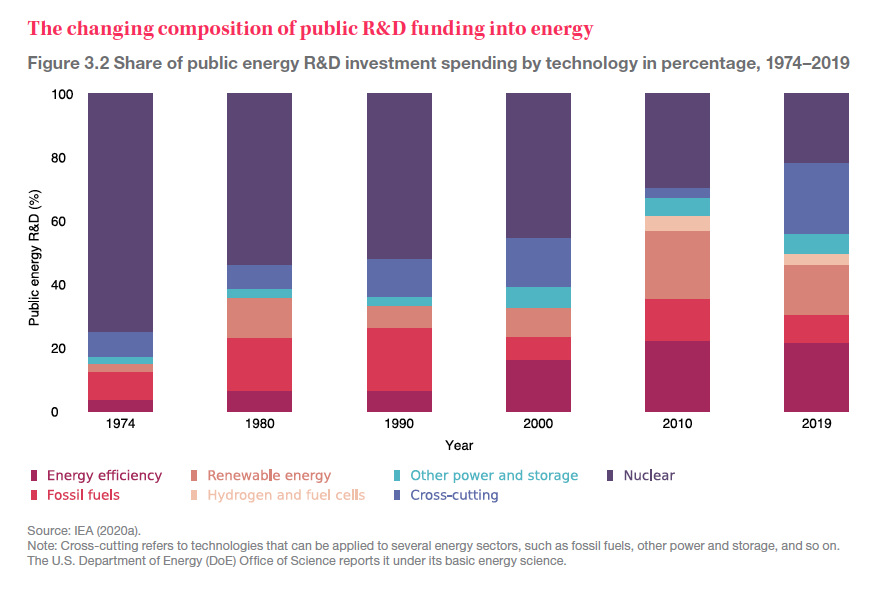
Changing composition of public R&D funding into energy - report 2022

The Direction of Innovation was released on April 7, 2022. It focuses on the role of innovation in opening up growth possibilities and creating solutions to global challenges such as climate change and pandemics.

Chapter 1 explores the main conceptual elements governing the direction of innovation, such as who sets the direction of innovation; the economic forces at work; and how can policy shape the direction of innovation. Chapter 2 examines these concepts in the light of historical case studies: innovation during the Second World War; the formation of a space industry; and the rise of Asia's innovation and technology industry. Chapter 3 looks forward to what innovation can do to meet three specific grand challenges - creating green technologies to contain global warming; applying the lessons learned from the COVID-19 crisis; and successfully riding the wave of digital general purpose technologies.

Main Contributors: Xiaolan Fu (University of Oxford), Henry Hertzfeld (George Washington University), Bhaven Sampat (Columbia University), Keun Lee (Seoul National University), Joëlle Noailly (Graduate Institute), Manuel Trajtenberg (Tel Aviv University), Richard Nelson (Columbia University)

=== 2019: The Geography of Innovation: Local Hostspots, Global Networks ===
The Geography of Innovation: Local Hostspots, Global Networks was released on November 12, 2019. It documents how the geography of innovation has evolved over the past few decades. The macro analysis of global trends is complemented by two case studies of technological fields undergoing rapid change – autonomous vehicles and agricultural biotechnology.

The report finds that innovation has become more collaborative. In the early 2000s, teams of scientists produced 64 percent of all scientific papers and teams of inventors were behind 54 percent of all patents. By the second half of the 2010s, these figures had grown to almost 88 and 68 percent, respectively.

According to the report, collaboration has also become more international in nature. The share of scientific collaborations with two or more researchers located in different countries grew to around 25 percent in 2017. For patents, the share of international co-inventions increased to 11 percent until 2009, but has since slightly fallen, partly because of rapid growth in domestic collaborations in certain countries. Most international collaboration takes place among the top metropolitan hotspots. The largest ten of them – San Francisco-San Jose, New York, Frankfurt, Tokyo, Boston, Shanghai, London, Beijing, Bengaluru, and Paris – account for 26 percent of all international co-inventions. The U.S. hotspots emerge as the most connected ones in the world.

Main Contributors: Riccardo Crescenzi (London School of Economics), Ernest Miguelez (University of Bordeaux), Kristin Dziczek (Center for Automotive Research), Gregory Graff (Colorado State University)

=== 2017: Intangible Capital in Global Value Chains ===
Intangible Capital in Global Value Chains was released on November 20, 2017. It examines the crucial role of intangibles such as technology, design and branding in international manufacturing. Macroeconomic analysis is complemented by case studies of the global value chains for three products – coffee, photovoltaic energy cells and smartphones – to give an insightful picture of the importance of intellectual property and other intangibles in modern production.

The report finds that intangible capital accounted, on average, for 30.4 percent of the total value of manufactured goods sold throughout 2000-2014. In addition, the intangible capital share rose from 27.8 percent in 2000 to 31.9 percent in 2007, but has remained stable since then. Overall, income from intangibles increased by 75 percent from 2000 to 2014 in real terms, amounting to USD 5.9 trillion in 2014. Finally, three product groups – food products, motor vehicles and textiles – account for close to 50 percent of the total income generated by intangible capital in the manufacturing global value chains.

Main Contributors: Wen Chen (University of Groningen), Tony Clayton (Imperial College London), Tom Neubig (Tax Sage Network), Dylan Rassier (U.S. Bureau of Economic Analysis), Luis F. Samper (4.0 Brands) and Daniele Giovannucci (Committee on Sustainability Assessment), Maria Carvalho (London School of Economics), Matthieu Glachant (MINES ParisTech), Jason Dedrick (Syracuse University) and Ken Kraemer (University of California, Irvine).

=== 2015: Breakthrough Innovation and Economic Growth ===
Breakthrough Innovation and Economic Growth was released on November 11, 2015. It reviews how extraordinary technological breakthroughs over the last 300 years have touched almost every aspect of human activity and transformed the world’s economies. Furthermore, it shows how three historical breakthrough innovations – airplanes, antibiotics and semiconductors – fueled new business activity. It examines three current technologies with breakthrough potential: 3D printing, nanotechnology and robotics. It concludes by considering the future outlook for innovation-driven growth.

Main Contributors: David Mowery (University of California, Berkeley), Lutz Budrass (Ruhr-Universität Bochum), Bhaven Sampat (Columbia University), Thomas Hoeren (Universität Münster), Stefan Bechtold (ETH Zürich), Lisa Ouellette (Stanford University) and C. Andrew Keisner (Davis & Gilbert LLP).

=== 2013: Brand - Reputation and Image in the Global Marketplace ===
Brand - Reputation and Image in the Global Marketplace was released on November 14, 2013. It explores the role that brands play in today’s global marketplace. The Report looks at how branding behavior and trademark use have evolved in recent history, how they differ across countries, what is behind markets for brands, what lessons economic research holds for trademark policy, and how branding strategies influence companies' innovation activities.

Main Contributors: Sören Petersen, Marcus Höpperger, Atif Ansar, Carol Corrado, Emmanuelle Fortune, Carl Benedikt Frey, Georg von Graevenitz, Janet Hao, Christian Helmers, Laurence Joly, Benjamin Mitra-Kahn, Sridhar Moorthy, Amanda Myers and Philipp Schautschick.(WIPO)

=== 2011: The Changing Face of Innovation ===
The Changing Face of Innovation was released on November 14, 2011. It describes key trends in the innovation landscape - including the increasingly open, international and collaborative character of the innovation process; the causes of the increased demand for IP rights; and the rising importance of technology markets.

Main Contributors: Josh Lerner and Eric Lin (Harvard Business School), Suma Athreye, José Miguel Benavente, Daniel Goya, Ove Granstand, Keun Lee, Sadao Nagaoka, Jerry Thursby, Marie Thursby, Yong Yang and María Pluvia Zuñiga (WIPO).

== Data and Methodology ==
The World Intellectual Property Report draws from WIPO Statistics Database, which has a data collection of patents, utility models, trademarks, industrial designs, microorganisms, plant variety protection, geographical indications and the creative economy.

Patent family and technology data are extracted from the WIPO Statistics Database and from the PATSTAT database of the European Patent Office (EPO). Gross domestic product, income group classification and population data are from the World Development Indicators database of the World Bank. Geographical regions are those defined by the United Nations.

== See also ==
- Global Innovation Index
- World Intellectual Property Indicators
- Intellectual property analytics
