= Trademark Law Treaty =

Trademark Law Treaty may refer to:

- the Paris Convention for the Protection of Industrial Property signed in 1883
- the Madrid Agreement Concerning the International Registration of Marks signed in 1891
- the International (Nice) Classification of Goods and Services signed in 1957
- the Trademark Law Treaty signed in 1994
- the Agreement on Trade-Related Aspects of Intellectual Property Rights (TRIPS) signed in 1994
- the Singapore Treaty on the Law of Trademarks signed in 2006
