= Vienna Agreement Establishing an International Classification of the Figurative Elements of Marks =

Vienna Classification
Vienna Agreement Establishing an International Classification of the Figurative Elements of Marks
- Signed: 1973
- Location: Vienna
- Effective: 1973
- Languages: English

The Vienna Agreement Establishing an International Classification of the Figurative Elements of Marks (also simply referred to as "Vienna Agreement") is an international treaty establishing the Vienna Classification, an international classification system for trademarks that consist of or contain figurative elements. It is administered by the World Intellectual Property Organization (WIPO). It was established in 1973 and amended in 1985. It is available in English and French.

== History ==
The United International Bureaux for the Protection of Intellectual Property (BIRPI)—the predecessor of the World Intellectual Property Organization (WIPO)—began working on a draft international classification of the figurative elements of marks in response to requests from several industrial property offices of member states of the Paris convention. This work was carried out with a committee of experts set up in 1967 by the BIRPI Interunion Coordination Committee. The classification was formally established by an agreement concluded on June 12, 1973, at the Vienna Diplomatic Conference. The Vienna Agreement entered into force on August 9, 1985.

== Purpose and scope ==
This classification aims to facilitate searches for trademarks and to avoid the substantial work involved in reclassification during international document exchange. Member states of the Vienna Agreement are no longer required to establish their own national classifications or update existing ones. Article 4 of the Vienna Agreement states that, subject to the requirements of the Agreement, the scope of the Classification of Figurative Elements is that attributed to it by each country of the Special Union. In particular, the classification of figurative elements does not bind the countries of the Special Union as to the extent of protection afforded to the mark. Offices of Contracting States are required to include in official documents and publications relating to the registration and renewal of marks the numbers of the categories, divisions, and sections of the Classification to which the figurative elements of those marks belong.

== Structure of Vienna Codes ==
The Vienna classification is a hierarchical system that classifies the figurative elements of trademarks, into categories, subdivisions and sections. Relevant explanatory notes have been introduced regarding the categories in their entirety, the divisions or the main sections. The auxiliary sections deal with the figurative elements included in the main sections, but grouping them according to a specific criterion makes preliminary research easier.

The classification is divided into:

- General Indications for the figurative elements of Marks
- More detailed indicators.

The number of divisions and sections varies depending on the classifications and divisions to which they belong. Certain numbers within the sections and divisions have been left vacant to allow for the insertion of new sections or divisions when necessary. Under the Vienna Classification system, there are currently (August 2026):

- 29 major classifications
- 145 divisions
- 841 main sections
- 930 auxiliary sections
