= Article 6ter =

Article 6ter of the Paris Convention for the Protection of Industrial Property provides special provisions for the protection of state emblems, official hallmarks, and emblems of intergovernmental organizations against unauthorized registration and use as trademarks. Article 6ter is an integral part of international trademark law and is aimed at preventing the misuse of emblems that have national or international significance. It does not generate a trademark right, or any other type of intellectual property right, over the signs that are covered by that provision.

== Overview ==
The Paris Convention, established in 1883 and still in force in 2024, is one of the first intellectual property treaties. It was created to provide a unified system that offers protection of industrial property, including patents, trademarks, and industrial designs, among its member countries. Article 6ter was added to the Convention in 1925 during the revision conference held in The Hague.

== Provisions ==
Signs to which Article 6ter applies are of three types and covered by article 6ter(1), article 6ter(2) and article 6ter(3).

=== Article 6ter(1): State armorial bearings, flags and other State emblems ===
This subsection prohibits the unauthorized registration and use of state emblems, official signs, and hallmarks indicating control and warranty, from countries of the Union, in trademarks. It mandates that member states refuse or invalidate the registration of a trademark containing such emblems, except where authorized by the competent authorities of the country concerned.

State emblems generally constitute the symbol of the sovereignty of a State. They frequently contain heraldic elements, such as a lion, an eagle, the sun, etc. It is understood that the category of “other State emblems” comprises the escutcheons of reigning Houses, as well as emblems of States included in a Federative State. However, emblems of lower public bodies (such as municipalities) and signs adopted for a limited period of time (for instance, for the celebration of a State anniversary) are not covered.

=== Article 6ter(2): Official signs and hallmarks indicating control and warranty adopted by States ===
This clause extends the protection to emblems, abbreviations, and names of international intergovernmental organizations, provided these are communicated to the member states through the International Bureau of the World Intellectual Property Organization (WIPO). Similar to state emblems, these cannot be registered or used without proper authorization.

The purpose of official signs and hallmarks indicating control and warranty is to certify that a State or an organization duly appointed by a State to that effect has checked that certain goods meet specific standards or have a given level of quality. Official signs and hallmarks indicating control and warranty exist in several States with respect to precious metals or products such as butter, cheese, meat, electrical equipment, etc. In principle, official signs and hallmarks indicating control and warranty may also apply to services, for instance those relating to education or tourism, etc. Only signs and hallmarks adopted by a State itself are eligible for the application of Article 6ter.

=== Article 6ter(3): Armorial bearings, flags, emblems, names, and abbreviations of IGOs of which one or more States party to the Paris Convention are members ===
Under this provision, the countries of the Union undertake to prohibit the unauthorized use of emblems and names which are of such a nature as to mislead the public about the existence of a connection between the user and the organizations mentioned in Article 6ter(2).

The protection does not extend to signs of IGOs which are already the subject of international agreements in force, intended to ensure their protection. Examples of such agreements are the Geneva Convention for the Amelioration of the Condition of the Wounded and Sick in Armed Forces (1949) which protects the emblems of the Red Cross, or the Nairobi Treaty on the Protection of the Olympic Symbol (1981).

== Procedure ==
The procedure for invoking Article 6ter protection involves a state party to the Paris Convention or an intergovernmental organization of which one or more member States are party to the Paris Convention, notifying WIPO of the emblems or marks it wishes to protect.

WIPO then communicates this information to all member countries in the form of a semi-annual electronic publication in the Article 6ter Express Database on the WIPO website.

Under each record of the database, the category of the sign concerned, as well as the entity (State or IGO) having requested its communication, is published in English and French, together with the reproduction of the sign and any relevant information (contact details, classification of the figurative elements, etc.).

The date of publication, also mentioned in the record, is considered to constitute the date of receipt of the communication by any party bound to apply Article 6ter. Consequently, the time periods provided for in Article 6ter(4) and (6) of the Paris Convention are calculated as of that date of publication.

The countries must then take measures to prevent the use or registration of trademarks that include or imitate these emblems.

However, after publication of the signs, any party bound to apply Article 6ter may, within a period of twelve months following the date of publication, issue an objection to the protection of a particular sign (Article 6ter(4)).

The following are examples of grounds on which objections have been based:

- the sign is not a symbol of sovereignty of the communicating State
- the sign does not constitute a hallmark for products
- the sign pertains to a lower entity
- an earlier trademark right is already protected in the jurisdiction

Information concerning objections (the name of the objecting State and the date of the objection) is reflected in the bibliographical data of the sign, in the Article 6ter Express Database.

A party that issued an objection is not under an obligation to apply Article 6ter to the sign concerned. Protection of such a sign in the parties that did not issue an objection is not affected.

== Implications and enforcement ==
Each member country is responsible for implementing Article 6ter into their national law, which can involve legislation, administrative procedures, or both.

== Challenges ==
Despite its intentions, the application of Article 6ter can be challenging. The determination of what constitutes an emblem of an international organization and the scope of "misleading" can be subjective and vary between jurisdictions. Moreover, enforcement relies heavily on the vigilance and legal frameworks of individual member states.

== Search ==
The Article 6ter Express Database is a publicly available and free-of-charge database, which allows for the search of any sign that has been communicated under that provision (including withdrawn signs). Searches can be made by State, name of the requesting entity, category of the signs, Vienna Classification or Circular number (for signs communicated before March 2009). The database does not constitute a registry, but merely an information tool.
