= World Intellectual Property Organization =

Specialized agency of the United Nations

- Abbreviation: WIPO
- Formation: 14 July 1967; 59 years ago
- Type: United Nations specialized agency
- Legal status: Active
- Headquarters: Geneva, Switzerland
- Members: 194 member states
- Head: Daren Tang; Director General
- Parent organization: United Nations Economic and Social Council
- Website: wipo.int

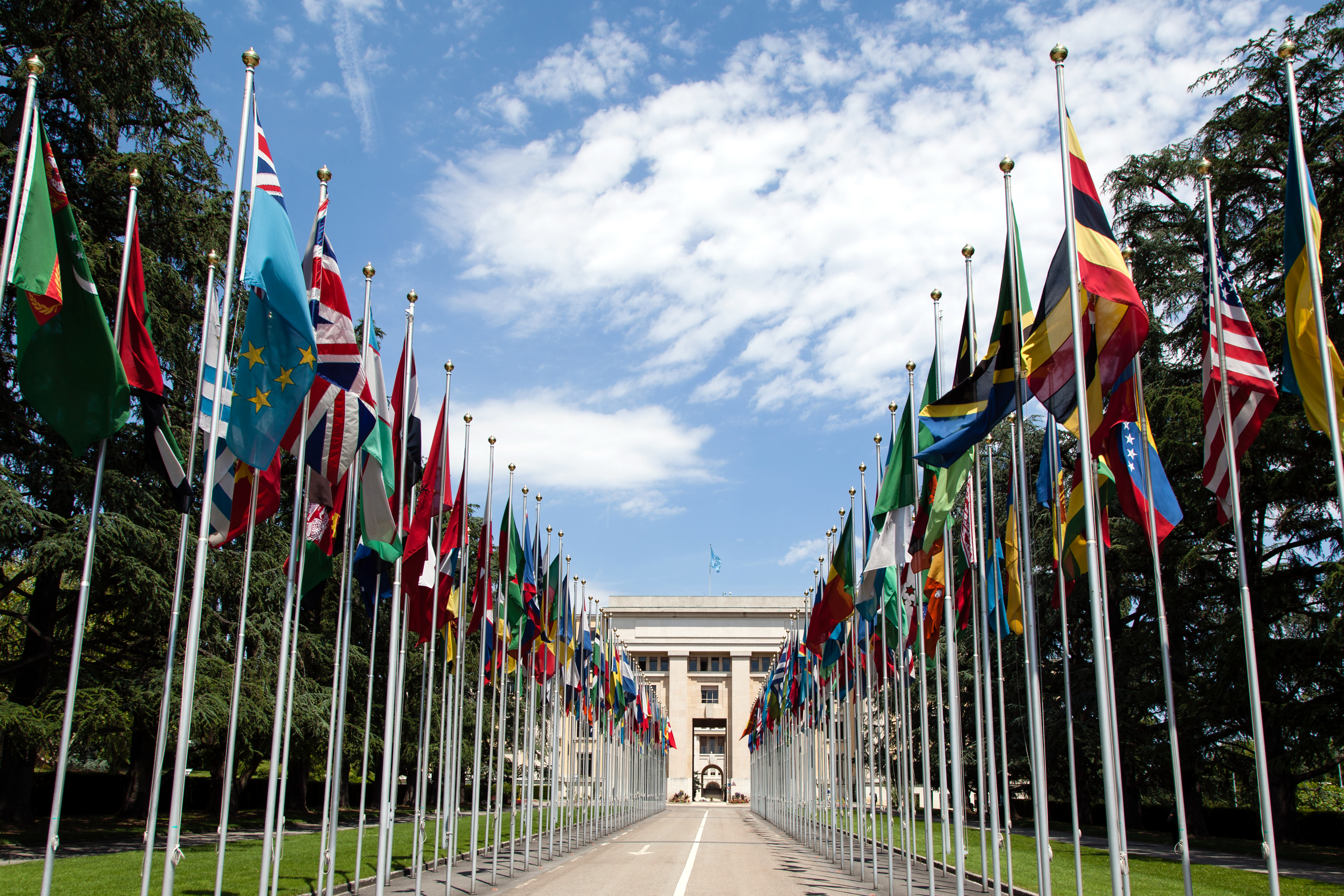
The United Nations Office at Geneva (Switzerland) is the second biggest UN centre, after the United Nations headquarters (New York City).

The World Intellectual Property Organization (WIPO; French: Organisation mondiale de la propriété intellectuelle (OMPI)) is one of the 15 specialized agencies of the United Nations (UN). (Note: In some sources, the UN indicates that there are 17 specialized agencies, when counting the International Bank for Reconstruction and Development (IBRD), the International Finance Corporation (IFC), and the International Development Association (IDA), all part of the World Bank Group (WBG), as individual specialized agencies.) Pursuant to the 1967 Convention Establishing the World Intellectual Property Organization, WIPO was created to promote and protect intellectual property (IP) across the world by cooperating with countries as well as international organizations. It began operations on 26 April 1970 when the convention entered into force. The current director general is Singaporean Daren Tang, former head of the Intellectual Property Office of Singapore, who began his first term on 1 October 2020.

WIPO's activities include: hosting forums to discuss and shape international IP rules and policies, providing global services that register and protect IP in different countries, resolving transboundary IP disputes, helping connect IP systems through uniform standards and infrastructure, and serving as a general reference database on all IP matters; this includes providing reports and statistics on the state of IP protection or innovation both globally and in specific countries. WIPO also works with governments, nongovernmental organizations (NGOs), and individuals to utilize IP for socioeconomic development.

WIPO administers 26 international treaties that concern a wide variety of intellectual property issues, ranging from the protection of audiovisual works to establishing international patent classification. It is governed by the General Assembly and the Coordination Committee, which together set policy and serve as the main decision-making bodies. The General Assembly also elects WIPO's chief administrator, the Director General, currently Daren Tang of Singapore, who took office on 1 October 2020. Tang was reappointed on April 21, 2026 for a second term that will run from October 1, 2026 through September 30, 2032. WIPO is administered by a Secretariat that helps carry out its day-to-day activities.

Headquartered in Geneva, Switzerland, WIPO has "external offices" around the world, including in Algiers (Algeria); Rio de Janeiro (Brazil); Beijing (China), Tokyo (Japan); Abuja (Nigeria); Moscow (Russia); and Singapore (Singapore). Unlike most UN organizations, WIPO does not rely heavily on assessed or voluntary contributions from member states; 95 percent of its budget comes from fees related to its global services.

WIPO currently has 194 member states, including 190 UN member states and the Cook Islands, Holy See and Niue; Palestine has permanent observer status. The only non-members, among the countries recognized by the UN are Palau and South Sudan.

== History ==
=== Pre BIRPI ===
==== 1883 – Paris Convention for the Protection of Industrial Property ====
The Paris Convention for the Protection of Industrial Property was adopted in 1883 and was one of the first intellectual property treaties. It established a Union for the protection of industrial property. Additionally, it applies to a wide range of industrial property including patents, trademarks, utility models, industrial designs, trade names, service marks, geographical indications as well as the "repression of unfair competition". The Paris Convention was the first international agreement to protect the works of creators in other countries.

Moving on, the convention was adopted in diplomatic conferences held in Paris in 1880 and 1883, it was then signed on 20 March 1883, on behalf of Brazil, France, Guatemala, Netherlands, Portugal, Serbia, Spain and Switzerland, Belgium, Italy and El Salvador. It consisted of the Convention proper, which contains 19 articles, and the Protocole de clôture (Final Protocol), which is almost the same length as the Convention proper. The "International Bureau" established by the Paris Convention for the Protection of Industrial Property later became part of BIRPI and later WIPO.

==== 1886 – Berne Convention for the Protection of Literary and Artistic Works ====
The Berne Convention was adopted in 1886, it deals with copyright, the protection of works and rights of authors and rights holders. It provides creators including writers, poets, painters, musicians with ways to control how and by who their works are used and the terms of use. It also contains provisions on minimum protections and special provisions for developing countries.

The Convention follows three basic principles; that works originating in one of the Contracting States must be given the same protection in each of the other Contracting States (principle of "national treatment"), that there is automatic protection and no formal process is required and that protection under the convention is independent of protection in the country of origin of the work (principle of "independence" of protection). An International Bureau was established to administer the Berne Convention. In 1893, it merged with the bureau administering the Paris Convention to form the United International Bureaux for the Protection of Intellectual Property (BIRPI), which was transformed into WIPO in 1970.

==== 1891 – Madrid Agreement Concerning the International Registration of Marks ====
In 1891 nine of the 14 States to the Paris Convention for the Protection of Industrial Property created the first "special arrangements for the protection of industrial property". Along with the Protocol Relating to the Madrid Agreement (1989) it created the Madrid System, the primary international system for facilitating the registration of trademarks in multiple jurisdictions around the world.

=== BIRPI ===
The Bureaus created to administer the Berne Convention for the Protection of Literary and Artistic Works and the Paris Convention for the Protection of Industrial Property were under "the high supervision" (haute surveillance) of the Government of the Swiss Confederation. In 1893 the Swiss government combined them with the same director and same staff as United International Bureaux for the Protection of Intellectual Property, Bureaux internationaux réunis pour la protection de la propriété intellectuelle (BIRPI). BIRPI was the predecessor of the World Intellectual Property Organization (WIPO) which superseded it 87 years later, in 1970.

=== Formation of WIPO ===
WIPO was formally created by the Convention Establishing the World Intellectual Property Organization, which entered into force on 26 April 1970. WIPO allowed members who were part of the Berne Convention, Paris Convention or a member of the United Nations system including the United Nations, any of its specialized agencies, the International Atomic Energy Agency or the International Court of Justice.

That date is commemorated annually as World Intellectual Property Day, which raises awareness of the importance of IP. Under Article 3 of this convention, WIPO seeks to "promote the protection of intellectual property throughout the world". WIPO became a specialized agency of the UN in 1974. The Agreement between the United Nations and the World Intellectual Property Organization notes in Article 1 that WIPO is responsible:

for promoting creative intellectual activity and for facilitating the transfer of technology related to industrial property to the developing countries in order to accelerate economic, social and cultural development, subject to the competence and responsibilities of the United Nations and its organs, particularly the United Nations Conference on Trade and Development, the United Nations Development Programme and the United Nations Industrial Development Organization, as well as of the United Nations Educational, Scientific and Cultural Organization and of other agencies within the United Nations system.

The Agreement marked a transition for WIPO from the mandate it inherited in 1967 from BIRPI, to promote the protection of intellectual property, to one that involved the more complex task of promoting technology transfer and economic development.

=== WIPO joining the United Nations ===
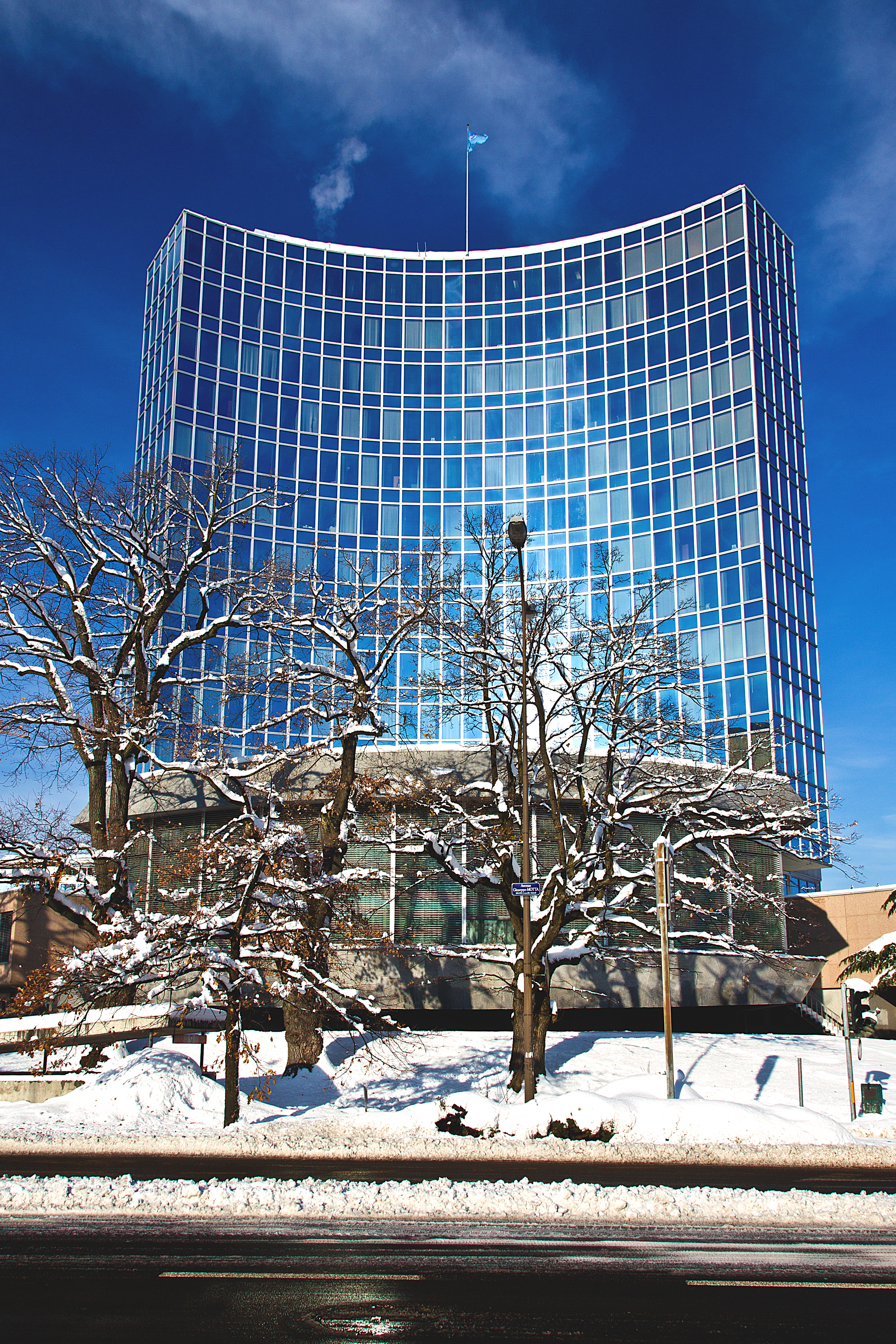
WIPO headquarters, Geneva

In 1974 WIPO became a specialized agency of the United Nations through a bilateral agreement between WIPO and the UN approved by the General Assembly of WIPO on 27 September 1974, and by the UN General Assembly on 17 December 1974. A protocol was signed by then Secretary-General of the United Nations, Kurt Waldheim and then Director General of WIPO Árpád Bogsch on 21 January 1975. The Agreement became effective on 17 December 1974. The relative importance of WIPO in global IP governance decreased after the United States incorporated intellectual property matters into the Uruguay Round of the GATT Negotiations in the 1980s.

=== WIPO Development agenda ===
In October 2004, WIPO agreed to adopt a proposal offered by Argentina and Brazil, the "Proposal for the Establishment of a Development Agenda for WIPO"—from the Geneva Declaration on the Future of the World Intellectual Property Organization. This proposal was well supported by developing countries. The agreed "WIPO Development Agenda" (composed of over 45 recommendations) was the culmination of a long process of transformation for the organization from one that had historically been primarily aimed at protecting the interests of rightholders, to one that has increasingly incorporated the interests of other stakeholders in the international intellectual property system as well as integrating into the broader corpus of international law on human rights, environment and economic cooperation.

A number of civil society bodies have been working on a draft Access to Knowledge (A2K) treaty which they would like to see introduced. In 2009, WIPO started drafting future treaties on intellectual property and genetic resources, traditional knowledge and folklore in relation with indigenous peoples and local communities. In December 2011, WIPO published its first World Intellectual Property Report on the Changing Face of Innovation, the first such report of the new Office of the Chief Economist. WIPO is also a co-publisher of the Global Innovation Index.

=== Recent events ===
WIPO members Members Non-members

In 2016, WIPO initiated the High-Level Conference on Intellectual Property for BRI Countries. WIPO Director General Francis Gurry encouraged countries participating in the Belt and Road Initiative to use WIPO tools like its global IP services and databases and to join WIPO-administered IP treaties.

In September 2020, China blocked the Wikimedia Foundation from observer status at WIPO citing the existence of a Wikimedia affiliate in Taiwan. According to the Chinese statement "there is reason to believe that this foundation has been carrying out political activities through its member organizations which could undermine the state's sovereignty and territorial integrity." China again rejected Wikimedia's bid, for the same reason, in 2021, 2023, 2024, 2025, and 2026.

WIPO, the World Health Organization (WHO) and the WTO launched on 11 April 2022 their new Trilateral COVID-19 Technical Assistance Platform. This new tool aims to help members and WTO accession candidates address their capacity building needs to respond to the COVID-19 pandemic. The Platform provides members and accession candidates with a single contact form which they can use to reach out to the trilateral organizations.

== Global services ==
=== Patent Cooperation Treaty ===
The Patent Cooperation Treaty (PCT) (1970) established a service which assists individuals, companies, and institutions in seeking patent protection internationally for their inventions. It also helps patent offices with their patent granting decisions and facilitates public access to technical information relating to those inventions. 153 countries are currently party to the PCT. Under the PCT, an applicant can file one PCT application in one language, at one patent office, within 12 months from the date of the earliest patent application which has been filed for the same invention (the "priority date"). This one PCT application has the same legal effect as filing separate regional or national patent applications in all PCT member countries. PCT applications are processed in a standardized manner as provided in the Treaty and Regulations, including an international search for documents relevant to the potential patentability of the invention and international publication. Granting patents remains under the control of the regional or national patent Offices in the "national phase". Using the PCT, patent applicants can postpone paying national and regional patent-related fees while they learn about the likelihood of obtaining a patent, benefitting from the additional time and information to help them decide whether, and in which countries, to pursue patents.

=== Madrid System ===
The Madrid System for the International Registration of Marks serves as a means to seek protection for trademarks worldwide, in over 120 countries. Created in 1891, the Madrid System is now governed by the Madrid Protocol Relating to the Madrid Agreement Concerning the International Registration of Marks (1989). In order to become a member of the Madrid System, a state or intergovernmental organization must already be a party to the Paris Convention for the Protection of Industrial Property (1883).

The Madrid System is a centralized trademark registration system: through a single application, in one language and with one set of fees (in one currency, the Swiss franc), protection can be obtained in member states and intergovernmental organizations. International registrations can then be modified, renewed or expanded, centrally through WIPO (rather than through each separate IP Office). The Madrid System can only be used by a natural person or a legal entity, which is a national, is domiciled or has a company in the territory of a member of the Madrid System.

=== Lisbon System ===
The Lisbon System for the International Registration of Appellations of Origin and Geographical indications provides a means of obtaining international protection for a geographical indication or an appellation of origin. Geographical indications and appellations of origin are intellectual property rights which identify a product that originates from a specific geographical area and that has characteristics that are attributable to its geographical origin. Comté cheese (France), Chulucanas pottery (Peru), Tequila (Mexico), Porto (Portugal), Herend porcelain (Hungary), and Kampot pepper (Cambodia) are examples of appellations of origin and geographical indications registered under the Lisbon System. Through a single registration and one set of fees, protection can be obtained in the other countries (and intergovernmental organizations, such as the European Union) covered by the Lisbon System.

The Lisbon System includes the Lisbon Agreement for the Protection of Appellations of Origin and their International Registration of 1958 ('the Lisbon Agreement') and, its latest revision, the Geneva Act of the Lisbon Agreement on Appellations of Origin and Geographical Indications of 2015 ('the Geneva Act') form the Lisbon System. Registrations under the Lisbon System are published in the official bulletin and can be searched through the Lisbon Express Database.

=== WIPO Arbitration and Mediation Center ===
The WIPO Arbitration and Mediation Center was established in 1994 as an international resource for alternatives to court litigation of intellectual property and technology disputes. It offers alternative dispute resolution (ADR) options including mediation, arbitration, and expert determination to resolve international commercial disputes between private parties. It is an administrator of cases and a provider of legal and policy expertise. The center also provides domain name dispute resolution services under the WIPO-designed UDRP. It is based in Geneva, Switzerland and since 2010 the center has had an office at Maxwell Chambers in Singapore.

=== Hague System ===
The WIPO Hague System for the International Registration of Industrial Designs provides an international mechanism for securing protection of up to 100 designs in multiple countries or regions, through a single international application, filed in one language and using one currency (Swiss francs). International design applications are filed directly through WIPO, according to the requirements and procedures established by the Hague Agreement. The domestic legal framework of each designated contracting party governs the design protection provided by the resulting international registrations.

According to the rules laid out by the Hague Agreement, anyone who is a national of, or who has a domicile, habitual residence or real and effective industrial or commercial establishment in any Hague System contracting party – including any country of the European Union or the African Intellectual Property Organization – can use the Hague System. The Hague System does not require the applicant to file a national or regional design application.

On 5 February 2020, China officially deposited its accession documents for entering the Hague System for the International Registration of Industrial Designs and the Marrakesh Treaty (which increases the accessibility of publications to people with visual impairment), before the commencement of the Beijing Olympic Winter Games. The accession will take effect on 5 May 2022. China became the 68th contracting party to the Geneva Act (1999) of the Hague Agreement and, therefore, the 77th member of the Hague System.

== Funding ==
WIPO, unlike other UN agencies, derives most of its income from fees for the Global IP services it provides as opposed to Member States contributions. In 2020, WIPO's revenue amounted to CHF 468.3 million. In 2020 WIPO generated over 94.3% of its revenue from fees that are paid by users of its intellectual property services for patents, trademarks and industrial designs due to international demand for intellectual property titles. These services are provided through the Patent Cooperation Treaty (PCT) (providing 76.6% of revenue), Madrid System (providing 16.3% of revenue) and Hague System (providing 1.4% of revenue).

== Governance and normative work ==
=== WIPO Assemblies ===
WIPO Assemblies develop global intellectual property agreements through bringing stakeholders together. The main policy and decision-making bodies of WIPO are the Coordination Committee and the General Assembly. Twenty-two Assemblies, the Unions administered by WIPO, and other bodies of the Member States of WIPO meet in ordinary or extraordinary sessions in autumn. The General Assembly appoints the Director General through nomination by the Coordination Committee. Any of the policy and decision-making bodies can constitute Permanent Committees or Standing Committees.

=== Standing Committees ===
Standing committees are ad hoc groups of experts established for a given purpose and acting as a place for policy discussions and negotiations on the future development of intellectual property. Any WIPO Standing Committee or other bodies also decide to establish a working group to examine a question in more detail, make suggestions or give advice on any subject within the competence of the Organization.

=== WIPO administered treaties ===
WIPO administers 26 treaties, including the WIPO Convention.

==== Intellectual property protection treaties ====
Intellectual property protection treaties define internationally agreed basic standards of intellectual property (IP) protection in each country.

Name	Description	History
Beijing Treaty on Audiovisual Performances	The Beijing Treaty on Audiovisual Performances is a multilateral treaty which regulates copyright for audiovisual performances and expands the performers' rights. It was adopted on 26 June 2012 by the Diplomatic Conference on the Protection of Audiovisual Performances of the World Intellectual Property Organization, in which 156 WIPO member states, six intergovernmental, and six non-governmental organizations participated. Forty-eight countries signed the treaty on 26 June, followed by 19 other countries in 2012 and 2013. The treaty entered into force on 28 April 2020 following the receipt of the 30th ratification or accession and as of September 2025 has 48 contracting parties.	Adopted on 26 June 2012. Entered into force on 28 April 2020
Berne Convention	The Berne Convention for the Protection of Literary and Artistic Works, usually known as the Berne Convention, was an international assembly held in 1886 in the Swiss city of Bern by ten European countries with the goal of agreeing on a set of legal principles for the protection of original work and intellectual property. They drafted and adopted a multi-party contract containing agreements for a uniform, border-crossing system that became known under the same name. Its rules have been updated many times since then. The treaty provides authors, musicians, poets, painters, and other creators with the means to control how their works are used, by whom, and on what terms. In some jurisdictions these types of rights are referred to as copyright; on the European continent they are generally referred to as authors' rights.	Adopted in 1886. Last amended on 28 September 1979
Brussels Convention Relating to the Distribution of Programme-Carrying Signals Transmitted by Satellite	The Brussels or Satellites Convention provides for the obligation of each Contracting State to take adequate measures to prevent the unauthorized distribution on or from its territory of any programme-carrying signal transmitted by satellite.	Adopted in 1974
Madrid Agreement for the Repression of False or Deceptive Indications of Source on Goods	According to the Madrid Agreement, all goods bearing a false or deceptive indication of source, by which one of the Contracting States, or a place situated therein, is directly or indirectly indicated as being the country or place of origin, must be seized on importation, or such importation must be prohibited, or other actions and sanctions must be applied in connection with such importation. This Agreement provides for the cases and the manner in which seizure may be requested and effected. It prohibits the use, in connection with the sale, display or offering for sale of any goods, of all indications in the nature of publicity capable of deceiving the public as to the source of the goods. It is reserved to the courts of each Contracting State to decide which appellations (other than regional appellations concerning the source of products of the vine) do not, on account of their generic character, come within the scope of the Agreement. The Agreement does not provide for the establishment of a Union, governing body or budget.	Adopted on 14 April 1891, revised at Washington on 2 June 1911, at The Hague on 6 November 1925, at London on 2 June 1934, and at Lisbon on 31 October 1958, supplemented by the Additional Act of Stockholm of 14 July 1967
Marrakesh VIP Treaty	The Marrakesh VIP Treaty (formally the Marrakesh Treaty to Facilitate Access to Published Works for Persons who are Blind, Visually Impaired or Otherwise Print Disabled, colloquially Marrakesh Treaty or MVT) is a treaty on copyright adopted in Marrakesh, Morocco, on 27 June 2013. It achieved the deposit of 20 instruments of ratification or accession by eligible parties needed for entry into force on June 30, 2016 and entered into force three months later, on September 30, 2016. As of April 14, 2025, the treaty has 101 contracting parties covering 127 WIPO Member States because the European Union joined as a block. As of September 2026, the treaty has 105 contracting parties.	Adopted on 27 June 2013
Nairobi Treaty on the Protection of the Olympic Symbol	The Nairobi Treaty intend to protect the Olympic symbol – five interlaced rings – against use for commercial purposes without the authorization of the International Olympic Committee.	Adopted at Nairobi on 26 September 1981
Paris Convention for the Protection of Industrial Property	The Paris Convention for the Protection of Industrial Property, signed in Paris, France, on 20 March 1883, is one of the first intellectual property treaties. It established a Union for the protection of industrial property. The convention is in force, with the substantive provisions of the Convention falling into three main categories: national treatment, priority right and common rules.	Adopted on 20 March 1883, revised at Brussels on 14 December 1900, at Washington on 2 June 1911, at The Hague on 6 November 1925, at London on 2 June 1934, at Lisbon on 31 October 1958, and at Stockholm on 14 July 1967, and amended on 28 September 1979
Patent Law Treaty	The Patent Law Treaty (PLT) is a treaty adopted by the World Intellectual Property Organization (WIPO) on 1 June 2000 in Geneva, Switzerland. It entered into force on April 28, 2005. It aims at harmonizing and streamlining formal procedures such as the requirements to obtain a filing date for a patent application, the form and content of a patent application, and representation. The treaty "does not establish a uniform procedure for all parties to the PLT but leaves parties free to require fewer or more user-friendly requirements than those provided in the PLT." As of July 2026, the PLT had 44 contracting states, that includes the European Patent Organisation (EPO) and the Eurasian Patent Organization (EAPO).	Adopted at Geneva on 1 June 2000
Geneva Phonograms Convention	The Convention for the Protection of Producers of Phonograms Against Unauthorized Duplication of Their Phonograms, also known as the Geneva Phonograms Convention, is a 1971 international agreement relating to copyright protection for sound recordings.	Adopted in Geneva in October 1971
Riyadh Design Law Treaty	The Riyadh Design Law Treaty (RDLT) was adopted on November 22, 2024, and will enter into force three months after there have been 15 ratifications or accessions. The objective of the Treaty is to streamline the procedures for design protection. By making the procedures less complex and more predictable, the RDLT helps designers to protect their work both in home markets and abroad.	Adopted on November 22, 2024
Rome Convention for the Protection of Performers, Producers of Phonograms and Broadcasting Organizations	The Rome Convention for the Protection of Performers, Producers of Phonograms and Broadcasting Organisations also known as the International Convention for the Protection of Performers, Producers of Phonograms and Broadcasting Organisations and the Rome Convention, secures protection in performances for performers, in phonograms for producers of phonograms (also known as sound recordings) and in broadcasts for broadcasting organisations. It was adopted in Rome on October 26, 1961.	Adopted in 1961
Singapore Treaty on the Law of Trademarks	The objective of the Singapore Treaty is to create an international framework for the harmonization of administrative trademark registration procedures. It builds on the Trademark Law Treaty of 1994 (TLT), but has a wider scope of application and addresses more recent developments in the field of communication technologies.	Adopted at Singapore on 27 March 2006
Trademark Law Treaty	The aim of the Trademark Law Treaty (TLT) is to standardize and streamline national and regional trademark registration procedures. This is achieved through the simplification and harmonization of certain features of those procedures, thus making trademark applications and the administration of trademark registrations in multiple jurisdictions less complex and more predictable.	Adopted at Geneva on 27 October 1994
Washington Treaty on Intellectual Property in Respect of Integrated Circuits	The Washington Treaty was adopted in 1989. It is meant to provide protection for the layout designs (topographies) of integrated circuits. As of 2023, the Treaty has not yet entered into force, but has been ratified or acceded to by 10 countries. See also Integrated circuit layout design protection.	Adopted at Washington on 26 May 1989 (not yet entered into force).
WIPO Copyright Treaty	The World Intellectual Property Organization Copyright Treaty (WIPO Copyright Treaty or WCT) is an international treaty on copyright law adopted by the member states of the World Intellectual Property Organization (WIPO) in 1996. It provides additional protections for copyright to respond to advances in information technology since the formation of previous copyright treaties before it. As of August 2026, the treaty has 119 contracting parties. The WCT and WIPO Performances and Phonograms Treaty, are together termed WIPO Internet Treaties.	Adopted in 1996
WIPO GRATK Treaty	The WIPO Treaty on Intellectual Property, Genetic Resources and Associated Traditional Knowledge (or GRATK) was adopted on May 24, 2024. The Treaty is an international legal instrument to combat biopiracy. It establishes a mandatory patent disclosure requirement – this requires patent applicants to disclose the country of origin of the genetic resources and/or the Indigenous Peoples or local community providing the associated traditional knowledge, if the claimed inventions are based on genetic resources and/or associated traditional knowledge.	Adopted in 2024
WIPO Performances and Phonograms Treaty	The WIPO Performances and Phonograms Treaty (or WPPT) is an international treaty adopted in Geneva on 20 December 1996. It came into effect on 20 May 2002. The treaty deals with the rights of two kinds of beneficiaries, particularly in the digital environment: performers (actors, singers, musicians, etc.); and producers of phonograms (persons or legal entities that take the initiative and have the responsibility for the fixation of sounds).	Adopted in 1996

==== Global protection system treaties ====
Global protection system treaties govern WIPO's services, ensuring that one international registration or filing will have effect in any of the relevant signatory States.

Name	Description	History
Budapest Treaty on the International Recognition of the Deposit of Microorganisms for the Purposes of Patent Procedure	The Budapest Treaty on the International Recognition of the Deposit of Microorganisms for the Purposes of Patent Procedure, or Budapest Treaty, is an international treaty signed in Budapest, Hungary, on April 28, 1977. It entered into force on August 19, 1980, and was later amended on September 26, 1980. The treaty is administered by the World Intellectual Property Organization (WIPO).	Done at Budapest on 28 April 1977, and amended on 26 September 1980
Hague Agreement Concerning the International Deposit of Industrial Designs	The Hague Agreement Concerning the International Deposit of Industrial Designs, also known as the Hague system, provides a mechanism for registering an industrial design in several countries by means of a single application, filed in one language, with one set of fees. The system is administered by WIPO.	Of 6 November 1925, revised at London on 2 June 1934, at The Hague on 28 November 1960, supplemented by the Additional Act of Monaco of 18 November 1961, the Complementary Act of Stockholm of 14 July 1967 amended on 28 September 1979, and the Protocol of Geneva on 29 August 1975, and at Geneva on 2 July 1999
Lisbon Agreement for the Protection of Appellations of Origin and their International Registration	The Lisbon Agreement for the Protection of Appellations of Origin and their International Registration, signed on 31 October 1958, ensures that in member states, appellations of origin receive protection when they are protected in their country of origin. It lays down provisions defining what qualifies as an appellation of origin, sets out protection measures, and establishes an International Register of Appellations of Origin, administered by the World Intellectual Property Organization. The Agreement came into force in 1966 and was revised at Stockholm (1967) and amended in 1979 and 2015. As of July 2026, the convention had 44 signatories, covering 73 countries, and 1000 appellations of origin have been registered.	Of 31 October 1958, revised at Stockholm on 14 July 1967, amended on 28 September 1979, and the Geneva Act adopted by the Diplomatic Conference on 20 May 2015
Madrid Agreement Concerning the International Registration of Marks	The Madrid System for the International Registration of Marks is governed by the Madrid Agreement, concluded in 1891, and the Protocol relating to that Agreement, concluded in 1989. The system makes it possible to protect a mark in a large number of countries by obtaining an international registration that has effect in each of the designated Contracting Parties.	Of 14 April 1891, revised at Brussels on 14 December 1900, at Washington on 2 June 1911, at The Hague on 6 November 1925, at London on 2 June 1934, at Nice on 15 June 1957, and at Stockholm on 14 July 1967, and amended on 28 September 1979
Protocol Relating to the Madrid Agreement Concerning the International Registration of Marks	The Madrid System for the International Registration of Marks is governed by the Madrid Agreement, concluded in 1891, and the Protocol relating to that Agreement, concluded in 1989. The system makes it possible to protect a mark in a large number of countries by obtaining an international registration that has effect in each of the designated Contracting Parties.	Adopted at Madrid on 27 June 1989, amended on 3 October 2006 and on 12 November 2007
Patent Cooperation Treaty	The Patent Cooperation Treaty (PCT) is an international patent law treaty, concluded in 1970. It provides a unified procedure for filing patent applications to protect inventions in each of its contracting states. A patent application filed under the PCT is called an international application, or PCT application.	Done at Washington on 19 June 1970, amended on 28 September 1979, modified on 3 February 1984, and on 3 October 2001

==== Classification treaties ====
Classification treaties that create classification systems that organize information concerning inventions, trademarks and industrial designs.

Name	Description	History
Locarno Agreement Establishing an International Classification for Industrial Designs	The Locarno Agreement establishes a classification for industrial designs (the Locarno Classification)	Signed at Locarno on 8 October 1968, and amended on 28 September 1979
Nice Agreement Concerning the International Classification of Goods and Services for the Purposes of the Registration of Marks	International Classification of Goods and Services also known as the Nice Classification was established by the Nice Agreement (1957), is a system of classifying goods and services for the purpose of registering trademarks. It is updated every five years and its latest 11th version of the system groups products into 45 classes (classes 1-34 include goods and classes 35-45 embrace services), and allows users seeking to trademark a good or service to choose from these classes as appropriate. Since the system is recognized in numerous countries, this makes applying for trademarks internationally a more streamlined process. The classification system is specified by the World Intellectual Property Organization (WIPO).	Of 15 June 1957, revised at Stockholm on 14 July 1967, and at Geneva on 13 May 1977, and amended on 28 September 1979
Strasbourg Agreement Concerning the International Patent Classification	The Strasbourg Agreement Concerning the International Patent Classification (or IPC), also known as the IPC Agreement, is an international treaty that established a common classification for patents for invention, inventors' certificates, utility models and utility certificates, known as the "International Patent Classification" (IPC). The treaty was signed in Strasbourg, France, on 24 March 1971; it entered into force on 7 October 1975 and was amended on 28 September 1979. The Agreement and the certified statement were registered by the World Intellectual Property Organization on 28 February 1980.	Of 24 March 1971, and amended on 28 September 1979
Vienna Agreement Establishing an International Classification of the Figurative Elements of Marks	The Vienna Agreement establishes a classification (the Vienna Classification) for marks that consist of, or contain, figurative elements.	Done at Vienna on 12 June 1973, and amended on 1 October 1985

== Policy work ==
=== Genetic resources, traditional knowledge and traditional cultural expressions ===
For years, many local communities, Indigenous peoples and governments have sought effective intellectual property (IP) protection for traditional cultural expressions (folklore) and traditional knowledge as tradition-based forms of ingenuity and creativity. As a living body of knowledge developed, sustained and passed on from generation to generation within a community, it is not easily protected under the current IP system, which typically grants protection for a limited period to new inventions and original works as private rights. Some genetic resources, too, are linked to traditional knowledge and related practices through their use and conservation by Indigenous peoples and local communities. Although genetic resources, as encountered in nature, are not eligible for IP protection, inventions based on or developed with the use of genetic resources may be patentable. Since 2010, the Intergovernmental Committee on Intellectual Property and Genetic Resources, Traditional Knowledge and Folklore (IGC) has been negotiating the text of one or several legal instruments on the matter.

=== Global health ===
WIPO Re:Search is a public-private partnership between WIPO and the non-profit BIO Ventures for Global Health focused on early-stage medical research and development against neglected tropical diseases (NTDs), malaria and tuberculosis. It has 150 members, including eight of the world's largest pharmaceutical companies. WIPO Re:Search supports collaborations between scientific institutions and pharmaceutical companies all over the world with the goal to advance research for medicines, treatment methods and diagnostic techniques against the neglected tropical diseases that affect over 1 billion people worldwide. Through these collaborations as well as its fellowship program, WIPO Re:Search provides shared compound libraries, repurposing methods, capacity building and works on the growth of international scientific networks.

=== Green technologies ===
WIPO GREEN is a free to access online marketplace for sustainable technology. It consists of three main elements: WIPO GREEN online database of green technologies and needs, WIPO GREEN Acceleration Projects, and WIPO GREEN partners network. It has a network of 146 partners and aims to bring together organizations in green technology help the implementation and diffusion of green technologies around the world.

The WIPO GREEN database is an online platform where green technology inventors can promote their products and businesses, organizations, governments who are looking for green technologies can explain their needs and seek collaboration with providers. WIPO GREEN 'acceleration projects' are organized annually in different countries or regions of the world, in collaboration with local organizations. These projects usually address a particular field and connect providers and seekers of green technologies.

=== WIPO Judicial Institute ===
The WIPO Judicial Institute was established in 2019 to coordinate and lead WIPO's work with national and regional judiciaries. This work includes convening international meetings between judges, implementing judicial capacity building activities, producing resources and publications for use by judges, and administering the WIPO Lex database that provides free public access to intellectual property (IP) laws, treaties and judicial decisions from around the world. WIPO has also established an advisory board of Judges, currently comprising 12 members who serve in their personal capacity.

=== WIPO Academy ===
The WIPO Academy is the training arm of the World Intellectual Property Organization (WIPO), it was established in 1998. It offers intellectual property (IP) education, training and IP skills-building to government officials, inventors, creators, business professionals, small and medium enterprises (SMEs), academics, students and individuals interested in IP. The academy hosts IP courses through its four programs: the Professional Development Program, University Partnerships, Distance Learning and WIPO Summer Schools.

=== The Standing Committee on Copyright and Related Rights ===
The Standing Committee on Copyright and Related Rights (SCCR) was created in the 1998 to examine issues in the field of copyright and related rights on substantive law and harmonization. The Committee includes all member states of WIPO, some member states of the United Nations who are not members of WIPO, and a number of non-governmental and intergovernmental observers. The Committee meets twice per year and formulates recommendations for consideration by the WIPO General Assembly. The main topics currently under discussion are the protection of broadcasting organizations and limitations and exceptions. Copyright in the digital environment, the resale royalty right, public lending right and the rights of theater directors are also being discussed within the committee.

== World Intellectual Property Day ==
World Intellectual Property Day is an annual global public awareness campaign to "highlight the role and contribution of intellectual property in the economic, cultural and social development of all countries as well as to raise public awareness and understanding in this field of human endeavor." In 2000, WIPO's Member States formally designated 26 April – the day on which the WIPO Convention came into force in 1970 – as World Intellectual Property Day. The first World Intellectual Property Day was held in 2001.

== Sectors and divisions ==
=== Economics and Statistics Division ===
WIPO's Economics and Statistics Division gathers data on intellectual property activity worldwide and publishes statistics to the public. The Division also conducts economic analysis on how government IP and innovation policies affect economic performance.

=== Infrastructure and Platforms Sector ===
The Infrastructure and Platforms sector develops, implements and maintains the various databases, tools and platforms of the Organization that are targeted at and used by intellectual property offices, legal professionals, researchers, and other specialized users. The sector also covers the use of 'frontier technologies' such as artificial intelligence and coordinates WIPO's overall customer goals, strategies and tools.

=== Diplomatic Engagement and Assemblies Affairs Division ===
The Diplomatic Engagement and Assemblies Affairs Division is directly under the supervision of the Director General, it focuses on engagement with the diplomatic community in Geneva through events, meetings and overseeing the administrative, logistical and other aspects of key meetings including the Assemblies of WIPO. The Division is also responsible for supervising the full range of protocol services across the Organization. Specifically, the Division is responsible for meeting all the Director General's representation and hospitality protocol-related needs and protocol-related needs for meetings and events.

=== Traditional Knowledge Division ===
The Traditional Knowledge Division carries out WIPO's work on genetic resources, traditional cultural expressions and traditional knowledge through its seven service areas. These include supporting indigenous and local community entrepreneurship in making strategic and effective use of intellectual property tools in their businesses; providing intellectual property advice on the documentation of traditional knowledge and traditional cultural expressions; organizing hands-on training, mentoring and distance learning programs; and acting as a global reference of information resources on the intersection of IP and genetic resources, traditional knowledge and traditional cultural expressions, as well as maintaining a repository of regional, national and community experiences. The Traditional Knowledge Division is also responsible for facilitating multilateral negotiations in the WIPO Intergovernmental Committee on Intellectual Property and Genetic Resources, Traditional Knowledge and Folklore.

=== WIPO Independent Advisory Oversight Committee ===
The "Independent Advisory Oversight Committee" is an external expert advisory body that assists member states with oversight of WIPO’s operations. The Committee’s mandate includes the promotion of internal controls, reviewing the effectiveness and operational independence of the internal oversight function, and reviewing and advising on the ethics function. Committee members serve in their personal capacity and shall not seek or receive any instructions from any Government or any other party.

== Publications and databases ==
WIPO publishes around 40 new titles a year, which are translated and published in the official languages of the United Nations: Arabic, Chinese, English, French, Russian and Spanish. The WIPO Knowledge Repository holds the archive of WIPO publications and documentations since 1885, as well as a library of academic research literature on intellectual property. WIPO adopted an Open Access Policy in 2016. Its publications are free to reuse and modify, under the terms of the Creative Commons Attribution 4.0 license.

Flagship publications	Databases
Global Innovation Index	WIPOLex
Innovation Cluster Rating	PATENTSCOPE
World Intellectual Property Report	Global Brand Database
World Intellectual Property Indicators	WIPO GREEN
WIPO Magazine	Global Design Database
Green Technology Book	Madrid Monitor
PCT Yearly Review	IP Statistics Data Center
Madrid Yearly Review	Article 6ter
Hague Yearly Review	Hague Express
WIPO Technology Trends	Lisbon Express
WIPO IP Facts and Figures	WIPO Pearl
	Access to Research for Development and Innovation (ARDI)
	Access to Specialized Patent Information (ASPI)
	Pat-Informed

=== Global Innovation Index ===
The Global Innovation Index is an annual ranking of countries by their capacity for, and success in, innovation, published by the World Intellectual Property Organization. It was started in 2007 by INSEAD and World Business, a British magazine. Until 2021 it was published by WIPO, in partnership with Cornell University, INSEAD, and other organisations and institutions. It is based on both subjective and objective data derived from several sources, including the International Telecommunication Union, the World Bank and the World Economic Forum.

=== World Intellectual Property Report ===
The World Intellectual Property Report is a biennial analytical publication by WIPO, first published in 2011. Each report examines a different theme, focusing on trends in a particular area of intellectual property and innovation. The report uses macroeconomic analysis and includes case studies to examine the role of intellectual property and other intangibles in the global economy.

=== World Intellectual Property Indicators ===
Since 2009, WIPO has published the annual World Intellectual Property Indicators, providing a wide range of indicators covering the areas of intellectual property. It draws on data from national and regional IP offices, WIPO, the World Bank, and UNESCO.

=== WIPO Lex ===
WIPO Lex is an online global database launched in 2010, which provides free public access to intellectual property laws, treaties and judicial decisions from around the world. In 2022, the WIPO Lex database contained 48,000 national, regional and international legal documents relating to intellectual property, with access in the six UN languages.

=== WIPO Magazine ===
WIPO Magazine, the organization's flagship outreach publication, is available in eight languages (Arabic, Chinese, English, French, Japanese, Portuguese, Russian and Spanish). Established in 1999, and online since 2005, WIPO Magazine explores the worlds of innovation and creativity, and the role of IP in advancing human progress. The WIPO Magazine features a range of articles on how people around the world are using IP rights to advance their goals and support national economic development. It also includes expert commentary on the latest "hot topics" relating to IP policy and practice. The WIPO Magazine is free of charge. In January 2023, it moved to a digital-only format.

=== PATENTSCOPE ===
PATENTSCOPE is a public patent database provided by WIPO that serves as an official publication source for patent applications filed under the Patent Cooperation Treaty and covers numerous national and regional patent collections. In 2021 it held over 100 million patent documents including 4.2 million published international patent applications.

=== The Green Technology Book ===
In November 2022 at UNFCCC COP27, WIPO introduced its new Flagship publication the Green Technology Book. This digital-first publication aims to put innovation, technology and intellectual property at the forefront in the fight against climate change. The inaugural edition of this annual publication focused on available solutions for climate-change adaptation to reduce vulnerability as well as to increase resilience to the impacts of climate change. The book was created in cooperation with the Climate Technology Center and Network (CTCN) and the Egyptian Academy of Scientific Research and Technology (ASTR). It features 200 adaptation technologies, which are also available in the WIPO GREEN database of innovative technologies and needs.

=== WIPO Pearl ===
The WIPO Pearl database was created in 2014. It gives access to scientific and technical terms derived from patent documents. It aims to promote accurate and consistent use of terms across different languages, and to make it easier to search and share scientific and technical knowledge. It operates in ten languages.

== Directors General ==
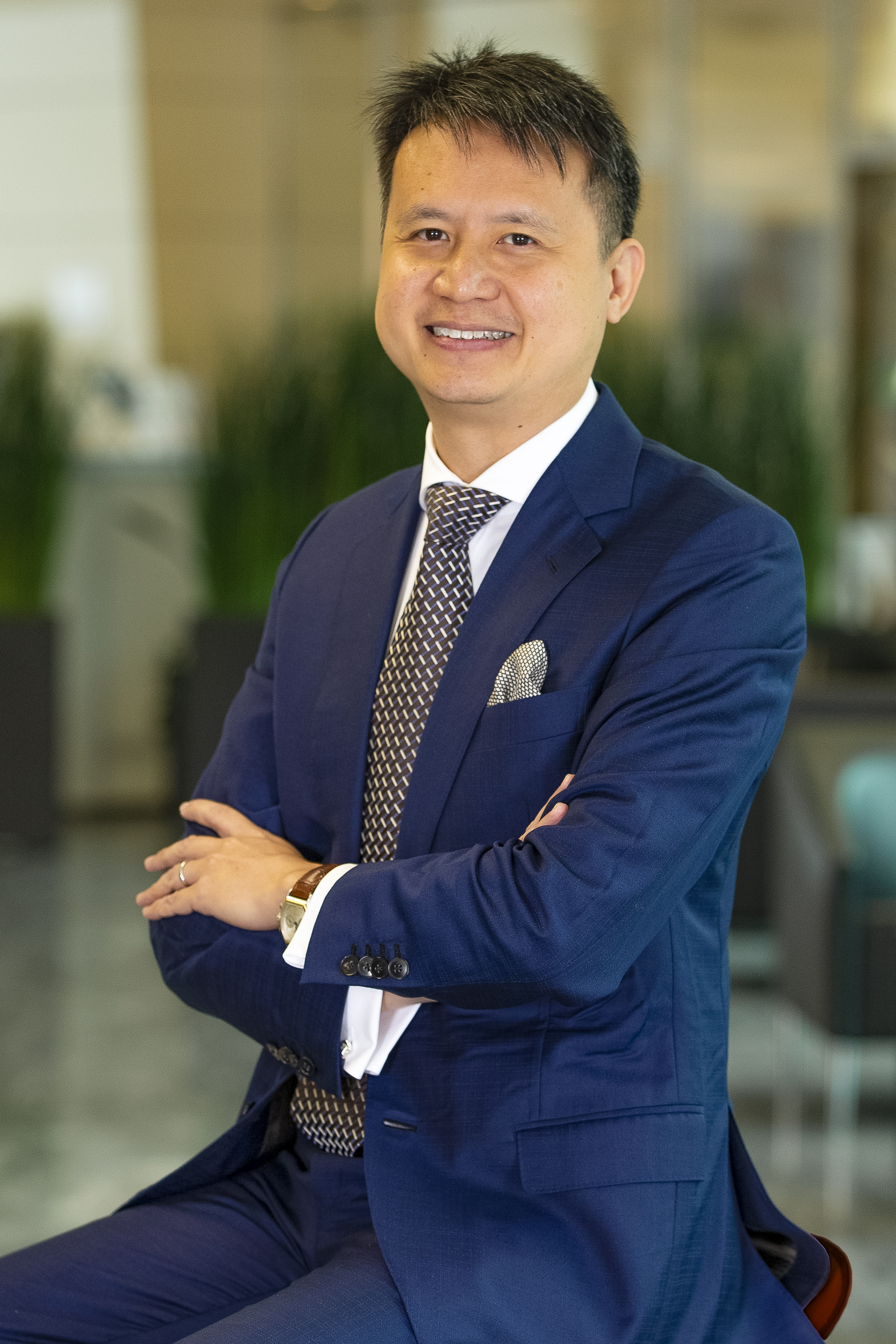
Current WIPO Director General Daren Tang (2020)

WIPO Directors General
No.	Term	Name	From
1	1970–1973	Georg Bodenhausen	Netherlands
2	1973–1997	Árpád Bogsch	United States
3	1997–2008	Kamil Eltayeb Idris	Sudan
4	2008–2020	Francis Gurry	Australia
5	2020–2026	Daren Tang	Singapore
6	2026–2032	Daren Tang	Singapore

On 1 October 2020, Daren Tang of Singapore succeeded Gurry as Director General. His candidacy was backed by the United States and 54 other countries over China's preferred candidate, Wang Binying, who received 28 votes out of the 83 voting members. Tang was reappointed on April 21, 2026 for a second term that will run from October 1, 2026 through September 30, 2032.

== See also ==
- Anti-Counterfeiting Trade Agreement
- Intellectual property organization
- List of parties to international copyright agreements
- Uniform Domain-Name Dispute-Resolution Policy
- World Intellectual Property Organization treaties
