= Global Design Database =

- Website type: Online IPI Database
- Available in: English, French, Spanish
- Owner: World Intellectual Property Organization
- Website: designdb.wipo.int/designdb/en/
- Commercial: No
- Registration: No registration
- Current status: Online and developing

The Global Design Database is a free online database developed and maintained by the World Intellectual Property Organization. It serves as a search service for industrial designs registrations to assist designers, researchers, intellectual property professionals, and policy-makers in exploring industrial designs worldwide, tracking design registrations, finding potential conflicts, giving access to design data for analysis, policy development, and academic research.

== History ==
The Global Design Database was officially launched in 2015. It was designed to provide a centralized platform for searching and retrieving design records from various national and international databases. At launch, it provided access to international registrations under the Hague System together with the Canadian national industrial design collection. The initial coverage included 185 000 records.

In the following years the database continued to evolve and expand its functionalities. Additional national and regional collections have subsequently been incorporated into the database.

As of December 2023, it contains over 15.5 million records.

== Content ==
The database provides access to international industrial design registrations administered through the Hague System for the International Registration of Industrial Designs, together with industrial design records contributed by participating national and regional intellectual property offices. Depending on the source collection, records may include bibliographic information, images of registered designs, holder details, Locarno Classification data, priority information and legal status.

== Search ==
The database supports searches using keywords, holder names, registration and application numbers, dates, countries and Locarno Classification symbols. Users may combine multiple search criteria and refine results using filters based on the available bibliographic fields. Search results may be displayed either as image grids or detailed record lists and can be exported in report form.

The Global Design Database supports multiple languages, allowing users to perform searches using keywords, design titles, applicants' names, and other relevant criteria in their preferred language.

Users can review the design's legal status and download relevant documents for further analysis and reference.

== See also ==
- Design infringement
- Industrial design right
- WIPO Lex
- Global Brand Database
- PATENTSCOPE
