= Patentscope =

Patent database

- Website type: Online IPI Database
- Available in: Arabic, Chinese, English, French, Russian, Spanish, and other languages
- Owner: World Intellectual Property Organization
- Website: patentscope.wipo.int
- Commercial: No
- Registration: No registration
- Users: 1,493,595 (Q4 2022)
- Launched: 2001
- Current status: Online

Patentscope is a global patent database and search system developed and maintained by the World Intellectual Property Organization. It provides free and open access to a vast collection of international patent documents, including patent applications, granted patents, and related technical information, as well as a limited coverage of non-patent literature.

== History ==
In 2001, WIPO launched Patentscope as an online service to provide free access to international patent documents. The database initially focused on the Patent Cooperation Treaty (PCT) applications, which are international patent applications filed under the PCT system. In 2008, it was transformed into a search system for not only published PCT applications, but also national and regional patent collections. In 2009 it counted with 9 data collections. In 2013, with the addition of the United States Patent and Trademark Office (USPTO) and China's national patent collections the database past the 30 million record mark.

In 2014, Espacenet, Patentscope and Depatisnet were the main multinational patent databases offered by patent authorities which are available to the public free of charge.

Chemical search was made available in 2016, allowing non-chemists to search for chemical compounds, with options such as exact structure search, substructure search and Markush search.

In 2018, WIPO implemented an AI tool for translating patent documents held in Patentscope.

In 2020, during the COVID-19 pandemic, WIPO launched a new search functionality to facilitate the location and retrieval of information useful to develop new technologies that could fight against the pandemic.

As of June 2023, the database included 111 million patents documents, including 4.6 millions published international patent applications.

Over the years, Patentscope's coverage expanded to include additional patent collections from various countries and regions, making it a global resource for patent information.

== Content ==
Patentscope provides access to published international patent applications filed under the Patent Cooperation Treaty, together with patent document collections contributed by participating national and regional intellectual property offices. The database includes bibliographic data, full-text documents where available, images, legal status information for international applications, and selected non-patent literature incorporated through agreements with scientific publishers and organizations.

== Search ==
Patentscope supports several search interfaces, including simple, structured and advanced search. Users can search using bibliographic information, publication and application numbers, applicant and inventor names, International Patent Classification symbols, keywords, dates and other indexed fields. For collections with full-text data, full-text searching and boolean operators are supported. Search results can be filtered, analysed and exported for further use. The tool also allows users to search for patents based on chemical components and structures.

== Multilingual tools ==
To facilitate searches across languages, Patentscope incorporates Cross-Lingual Information Retrieval, which expands search queries using multilingual terminology. The platform also provides WIPO Translate, a neural machine translation system developed specifically for patent documents, allowing users to consult patent texts in multiple languages. This tool has been shared with several UN organizations.

== Patentscope Artificial Intelligence Index ==
The Patentscope Artificial Intelligence Index provides access to the patent applications related to artificial intelligence (AI). The index follows the same categorization - AI techniques, AI functional applications, and AI application fields – and equivalent search model used in the WIPO Technology Trends Report: Artificial Intelligence. The index allows searching using key phrases, CPC (Cooperative Patent Classification) and IPC (International Patent Classification) symbols.

== Limited non-patent literature ==
In March 2021, the database has expanded its collection non-patent literature (NPL) by incorporating publications from scientific publishers and technical organizations. At first only open access publications from Springer Nature were added, which was followed by 365,000 articles from a fully-OA publisher MDPI in September 2022, by nearly 5 million documents from IEEE in October 2023 and over 130000 records from Wikipedia in December 2025. As of July 2026, this collection had a total of 6.8 millions of records.

Nevertheless, even in December 2025 Patentscope does not cover publications from such major publishers as American Chemical Society, American Institute of Physics and Wiley.

== See also ==
- Intellectual property
- Patent classification
- Technology transfer
- Prior art
- Patent infringement
- WIPO Lex
- Global Brand Database
- Global Design Database
