= Lisbon Agreement for the Protection of Appellations of Origin and their International Registration =

1958 international treaty

Lisbon Agreement
Lisbon Agreement for the Protection of Appellations of Origin and their International Registration of October 31, 1958, as revised at Stockholm on July 14, 1967, and as amended on September 28, 1979
- Lisbon Agreement and Geneva act Geneva act, but not Lisbon agreement Lisbon agreement, but not Geneva act covered by OAPI/EU's accession (Geneva act) and to Lisbon agreement covered by OAPI/EU's accession (Geneva act) and party to Lisbon and/or Geneva act covered by OAPI/EU's accession (Geneva act)
- Signed: 31 October 1958 (Lisbon); 14 July 1967 (Stockholm); 21 May 2015 (Geneva)
- Location: Lisbon, Stockholm, Geneva
- Effective: 25 September 1966 (Lisbon); 31 October 1973 (Stockholm); 26 February 2020 (Geneva)
- Signatories: 30 (Lisbon); 29 (Stockholm); 27 (Geneva)
- Depositary: Switzerland (Lisbon), Sweden (Stockholm), WIPO (Geneva)
- Language: French (Lisbon, Stockholm)
- Languages: Arabic, Chinese, English, French, Russian, Spanish (Geneva)

The Lisbon Agreement for the Protection of Appellations of Origin and their International Registration, signed on 31 October 1958, ensures that in member states, appellations of origin receive protection when they are protected in their country of origin. It lays down provisions defining what qualifies as an appellation of origin, sets out protection measures, and establishes an International Register of Appellations of Origin, administered by the World Intellectual Property Organization. The Agreement came into force in 1966 and was revised at Stockholm (1967) and amended in 1979 and 2015. As of July 2026, the convention had 44 signatories, covering 73 countries, and 1000 appellations of origin have been registered.

Lisbon Agreement also establishes a Special Union under Article 19 of the Paris Convention for the Protection of Industrial Property (1883). Some aspects of the Agreement have been superseded by the Agreement on Trade-Related Aspects of Intellectual Property Rights (TRIPS) adopted in 1994.

== Geneva Act ==
In May 2015, the Geneva Act to the Agreement was adopted, formally extending protection to geographical indications and changing the name to the Geneva Act of the Lisbon Agreement on Appellations of Origin and Geographical Indications. The Act also allows intergovernmental organisations to become parties. On 21 May 2015, the Act was signed by 13 states: Bosnia and Herzegovina, Burkina Faso, Congo, France, Gabon, Hungary, Mali, Nicaragua, Peru, Romania, and Togo. It entered into force in 2020 following ratifications or accessions by five parties: Albania, Cambodia, the European Union, North Korea, and Samoa. As of 31 March 2026, the number of Parties is 27 (covering 62 countries), with Bulgaria as the most recent accession.

== Parties ==
The treaty applies mutually between the parties to the 1958 Lisbon Agreement and the 1967 Stockholm Act, but not between a party solely to the 1958 Agreement and another party solely to the 1967 Stockholm Act. The Geneva Act entered into force in 2020 and applies only between its parties. If a state is a party to multiple Lisbon instruments, an appellation of origin registered under any of those instruments also applies to the parties to the other instruments to which that state is a party.

State	Lisbon Agreement	Stockholm Act	Geneva Act	Registered AOs and GIs	Notes
African Intellectual Property Organization (OAPI)			15 March 2023	0	Only application to Geneva Act possible
Albania	8 May 2019	8 May 2019	26 February 2020	2	
Algeria	5 July 1972	31 October 1973		7	
Bosnia and Herzegovina	4 July 2013	4 July 2013		4	
Bulgaria	12 August 1975	12 August 1975	30 June 2026	32	Also covered by Geneva act through EU accession
Burkina Faso	2 September 1975	2 September 1975		0	Also covered by Geneva act through OAPI accession
Cabo Verde			6 July 2022	0	
Cambodia			26 February 2020	2	
Congo	16 November 1977	16 November 1977		0	
Costa Rica	30 July 1997	30 July 1997		2	
Cuba	25 September 1966	8 April 1975		20	
Czech Republic	1 January 1993	1 January 1993	2 September 2022	22	Also covered by Geneva act through EU accession
Djibouti			13 May 2024	0	
Dominican Republic	17 January 2020	17 January 2020		1	
Czechoslovakia	25 September 1966- 1 January 1993	31 October 1973- 1 January 1993			Continued application by Czech Republic and Slovakia
European Union			26 February 2020	270	Only application to Geneva Act possible
France	25 September 1966	12 August 1975	21 April 2021	381	Also covered by Geneva act through EU accession
Gabon	10 June 1975	10 June 1975		0	
Georgia	23 September 2004	28 September 2004	14 October 2025	28	
Ghana			3 February 2022	0	
Haiti	25 September 1966			0	
Hungary	23 March 1967	31 October 1973	10 September 2021	20	Also covered by Geneva act through EU accession
Iran	9 March 2006	9 March 2006		98	
Israel	25 September 1966	31 October 1973		1	
Italy	29 December 1968	24 April 1977	14 October 2026	166	Also covered by Geneva act through EU accession
Ivory Coast			15 March 2023	0	Also covered by Geneva act through OAPI accession
Laos			20 February 2021	0	
Mexico	25 September 1966	26 January 2001		17	
Moldova		5 April 2001	11 October 2024	1	
Montenegro	3 June 2006	3 June 2006	10 October 2024	2	
Nicaragua	15 June 2006	15 June 2006		0	
North Korea	4 January 2005	4 January 2005	26 February 2020	6	
North Macedonia	6 October 2010	6 October 2010		5	
Oman			30 June 2021	1	
Peru	16 May 2005	16 May 2005	18 October 2022	10	
Portugal	25 September 1966	17 April 1991	18 January 2024	7	Also covered by Geneva act through EU accession
Russia			11 August 2023	2	
Samoa			26 February 2020	0	
São Tomé and Príncipe			2 November 2023	0	
Senegal			5 December 2023	0	Also covered by Geneva act through OAPI accession
Serbia	1 June 1999	1 June 1999	21 October 2026	6	
Slovakia	1 January 1993	1 January 1993	9 October 2024	7	Also covered by Geneva act through EU accession
Switzerland			31 August 2021	3	
Togo	30 April 1975	30 April 1975	21 May 2015	0	Also covered by Geneva act through OAPI accession
Tunisia	31 October 1973	31 October 1973	6 July 2023	9	

== See also ==
- Appellation
- Geographical indications
