= Geographical indication =

Indication of a product's source

A geographical indication (GI) is a name or sign protected by intellectual property used on products which corresponds to a specific geographical location or origin (e.g., a town or region) and possess qualities or a reputation that are due to that origin.

The use of a geographical indication, as an indication of the product's source, is intended as a certification that the product possesses certain qualities, is made according to traditional methods, or enjoys a good reputation due to its geographical origin.

A geographical indication differs from an appelation of origin (also referred to as a designation of origin) since the latter is a special type of geographical indication where the link with the place of origin must be stronger and it requires more criteria for recognition. For a GI the geographical link is more flexible, since it is sufficient for only one characteristic of the product to be attributable to its geographical origin.

== Legal definitions ==
Article 22.1 of the TRIPS Agreement from 1995 defines geographical indications as "...indications which identify a good as originating in the territory of a Member [of the World Trade Organization], or a region or locality in that territory, where a given quality, reputation or other characteristic of the good is essentially attributable to its geographical origin."

The Geneva Act of the Lisbon Agreement on Appellations of Origin and Geographical Indications, adopted in 2015 and in force since 2020, modernized the Lisbon System, formally incorporated a definition of geographical indication consistent with TRIPS standard. Article 2(1)(ii) of the Geneva Act defines a GI as: "any indication protected in the Contracting Party of Origin consisting of or containing the name of a geographical area, or another indication known as referring to such area, which identifies a good as originating in that geographical area, where a given quality, reputation or other characteristic of the good is essentially attributable to its geographical origin."

== History ==
Governments have protected trade names and trademarks of food products identified with a particular region since at least the end of the 19th century, using laws against false trade descriptions or passing off, which generally protects against suggestions that a product has a certain protection benefits.

One of the first GI systems is the one used in France from the early part of the 20th century known as appellation d'origine contrôlée (AOC). The first law in France explicitly dedicated to the protection of appellations of origin was the Law of 6 May 1919 (Loi du 6 mai 1919 relative à la protection des Appellations d’Origin) which left to the courts the determination of the areas of production of an AO, but without defining the term. The decret-law of 30 July 1935 (Decret-Loi 30 Juillet 1935, Défense du marché des vins et régime économique de l’alcool) introduced the concept of Appellations d’Origine Contrôllées as a kind of AO; it also stablished the Comité National des Appellations d’Origine (CNAO) the administrative precedent of the Institut National des Appellations d’Origine (INAO).

In French system, Items that meet geographical origin and quality standards may be endorsed with a government-issued stamp which acts as official certification of the origins and standards of the product. Examples of products that have such "appellations of origin" include Gruyère cheese (from Switzerland) and many French wines.

Parallel to French initiatives, in 1924, Italy enacted its first decret on protection of "typical wines" (vini tipici) through the consortia for the protection of wine (consorzi di tutela). The statutes of the consortia had to be ratified by the Ministry of Agriculture that also had to monitor them. This decret didn't define de concept of designation but the one of typical wine: "typical wines are the genuine wines whose characteristics result from the type of grapevines, the zone of production or the methods of production and that remain identical for the same type of wine".Later in 1930, a law stablished that soil and climate conditions gave the wine its typical features. Finally, in 1963 the decret "on the protection of the designations of origin of musts and wines" abandoned the category of vini tipici and introduced three protection labels: Denominazione d’Origine Semplice (DOS); Denominazione di Origine Controllata (DOC); and Denominazione di Origine Controllata e Garantita (DOCG).

Under "Champagnerparagraph" of the 1919 Treaty of Versailles, Germany was forbidden from using allied geographical indications on products, which in particular affected the German "cognac" and "champagne" industries, as the French considered the terms misleading references to places in France. Since then, the terms "Weinbrand" and "Sekt" have been used instead.

Geographical indications have long been associated with the concept of terroir and with Europe as an entity, where there is a tradition of associating certain food products with particular regions. Under European Union law, a sui generis geographical indications framework was adopted in 1992 regulating two separate GI schemes called Protected Designation of Origin (PDO) and Protected Geographical Indication (PGI).

Since 2006, the European Union has required provisions in geographical indications in its free trade agreements.

== Products protected ==
The primary examples of geographical indications include agricultural products and wines and spirits, such as Champagne, Colombian coffee, Feta cheese, or Longjing tea. Nevertheless, the use of geographical indications is not limited to those products.

A geographical indication may also highlight specific qualities of a product that are due to human factors found in the product's place of origin, such as specific manufacturing skills and traditions. For example, handicrafts, which are generally handmade using local natural resources and usually embedded in the traditions of local communities.

An EU Regulation on geographical indication (GI) protection for craft and industrial products (CI) entered into force on 16 November 2023: the EC Regulation 2023/2411, known also as CI Regulation. It introduced a new EU-wide GI protection scheme for these types of product. Following its entry into force, the European Union Intellectual Property Office (EUIPO) gained the authority to handle GIs for craft and industrial products (CIGIs), applicable from 1 December 2025. Since that date, it is possible to file applications for the registration of names of craft and industrial products meeting the necessary requirements in the EU.

== Differences between geographical indications and other protections ==
=== Trademarks ===
Geographical indications and trademarks are distinctive signs used to distinguish goods or services in the marketplace. Both convey information about the origin of a good or service, and enable consumers to associate a particular quality with a good or service. Nevertheless, while trademarks inform consumers about the source of a good or service as originating from a particular company, geographical indications identify a good as originating from a particular place, what allows to associate it with a particular quality<!— awkward/unclear phrasing —>, characteristic or reputation.

A trademark often consists of an arbitrary sign that may be used by its owner or another person authorized to do so. A trademark can be assigned or licensed to anyone, anywhere in the world, because it is linked to a specific company and not to a particular place. In contrast, the sign used to denote a geographical indication usually corresponds to the name of the place of origin of the good, or to the name by which the good is known in that place. A geographical indication may be used by all persons who, in the area of origin, produce the good according to specified standards. However, because of its link with the place of origin, a geographical indication cannot be assigned or licensed to someone outside that place or not belonging to the group of authorized producers.

=== Appellation of origin ===
Appellations of origin are a special kind of geographical indication. The term is used in the Paris Convention and defined in the Lisbon Agreement, that in its Article 2 defines appellations of origin as:

(1)... the geographical denomination of a country, region, or locality, which serves to designate a product originating therein, the quality or characteristics of which are due exclusively or essentially to the geographical environment, including natural and human factors.

Although not all AOs consist of the name of the product's place of origin. A number of traditional indications that are not place names, but refer to a product in connection with a place, are protected as appellations of origin under the Lisbon Agreement (i.e., Reblochon (cheese) and Vinho Verde (green wine)).

Appellations of origin and geographical indications both require a qualitative link between the product to which they refer and its place of origin, but the link with the place of origin must be stronger in the case of an appellation of origin. The quality or characteristics of a product protected as an appellation of origin must be due exclusively or essentially to the geographical environment, which comprises both natural factors (soil, climate, etc.) and human factors, a concept historically known as terroir.

In the case of geographical indications, a single criterion attributable to geographical origin is sufficient, be it a quality or other characteristic of the product, or only its reputation. Moreover, the production of the raw materials and the development or processing of a GI product do not necessarily take place entirely in the defined geographical area.

== Rural development effects ==
Geographical indications are generally applied to traditional products, produced by rural, marginal or indigenous communities over generations, that have gained a reputation on local, national or international markets due to their specific unique qualities. The Food and Agriculture Organization (FAO) has promoted GIs as a powerful tool for sustainable food development, through territorial linkages, especially for small-scale actors, by preventing the delocalization of production, preserving local biodiversity, and creating jobs. The World Intellectual Property Organization (WIPO) emphasizes the economic benefits: by mitigating information asymmetry between producers and consumers and free-riding on product reputation, GI's act as a protection mechanism for both sides of market.

Producers can add value to their products through Geographical Indications by:

- communicating to consumers the product's characteristics, which derive from the climate, soil and other natural conditions in its particular geographical area;
- promoting the conservation of local traditional production processes;
- protecting and adding value to the cultural identity of local communities; and
- coordinating to enforce strict production methods and quality standards (e.g., the consortium for Parmigiano-Reggiano), which prevents market cannibalization, avoids a race to the bottom, and ensures consumer trust.

The recognition and protection of the names of these products allows the community of producers to invest in maintaining the specific qualities of the product on which the reputation is built. Resulting investments may be directed to the sustainability of the environment where these products originate and are produced. GI's can offer a comprehensive framework for rural development, since they can positively encompass issues of economic competitiveness, stakeholder equity, environmental stewardship, and socio-cultural value.

Rural development impacts from geographical indications, referring to environmental protection, economic development and social well-being, can be:

- the strengthening of sustainable local food production and supply (except for non-agricultural GIs such as handicrafts);
- a structuring of the supply chain around a common product reputation linked to origin and added value throughout the supply chain;
- greater bargaining power to raw material producers for better distribution so as for them to receive a higher retail price benefit percentage;
- capacity of producers to invest economic gains into higher quality to access niche markets, improving circular economy means throughout the value chain, protection against infringements such as free-riding from illegitimate producers, etc.;
- economic resilience in terms of increased and stabilised prices for the GI product to avoid the commodity trap through de-commodisation, or to prevent/minimise external shocks affecting the premium price percentage gains (usually varying from 20 to 25%);
- spill-over effects such as new business and even other GI registrations;
- preservation of the natural resources on which the product is based and therefore protect the environment;
- preservation of traditions and traditional knowledge;
- identity based prestige;
- linkages to rural tourism, particularly when regions build experiences and storytelling around their protected products (e.g., cellars in Champagne or cheese-aging caves in Roquefort).

None of these impacts are guaranteed and they depend on numerous factors, including the process of developing the geographical indications, the type and effects of the association of stakeholders, the rules for using the GI (or Code of Practice), the inclusiveness and quality of the collective dimension decision making of the GI producers association and quality of the marketing efforts undertaken. Success heavily depends on consumer education and awareness; without marketing and storytelling, legal protection may act merely as an administrative burden without creating market advantage.

Furthermore, implementing GIs can present practical challenges for rural development. High compliance costs, such as certification, independent audits, and annual administrative fees, can create barriers to entry that price out smaller producers who need the protection the most. There is also a risk of regulatory capture, where larger producers shape the GI standards to exclude local competition. Overly rigid specifications can sometimes act as a straitjacket, stifling innovation or leading to market protectionism by preventing adaptation to evolving global market demands.

In China, the use of GIs have increased farmers' incomes and helped reduce rural poverty.

== International issues ==
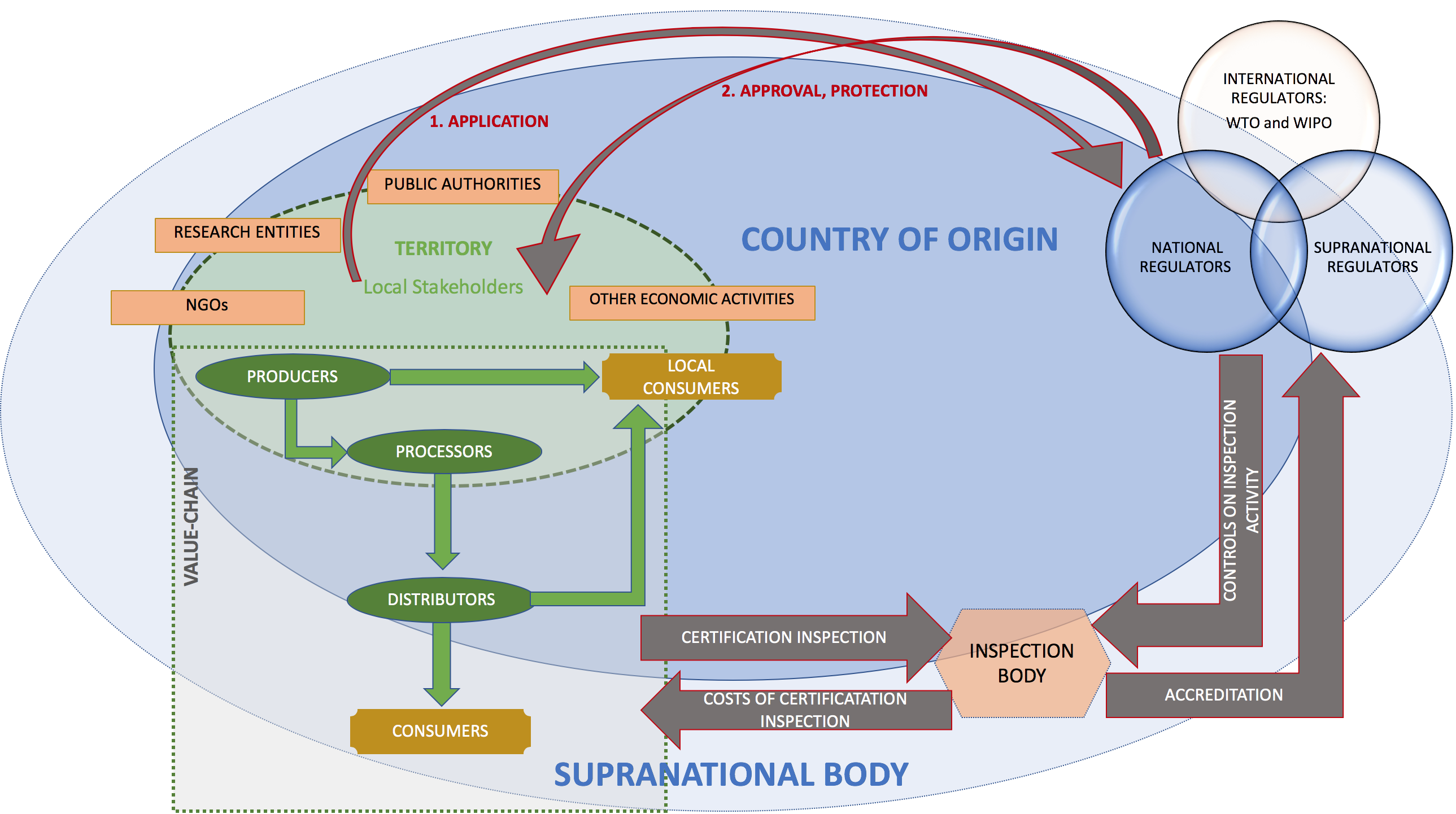
GI Collective Dimension

Like trademarks, geographical indications follow the "territoriality principle", which means that are regulated locally by each country because conditions of registration such as differences in the generic use of terms vary from country to country. This is especially true of food and beverage names which frequently use geographical terms, but it may also be true of other products such as textiles (e.g. 'Khatam of Shiraz'), handicrafts, flowers and perfumes.

When products with GIs acquire a reputation of international magnitude, some other products may try to pass themselves off as the authentic GI products. This kind of competition is often seen as unfair, as it may discourage traditional producers as well as mislead consumers. Thus the European Union has pursued efforts to improve the protection of GI internationally. Inter alia, the European Union has established distinct legislation to protect geographical names in the fields of wines, spirits, agricultural products including beer. A register for protected geographical indications and denominations of origin relating to products in the field of agriculture including beer, but excluding mineral water, was established (DOOR). Another register was set up for wine region names, namely the E-Bacchus register. In November 2020, the European Union Intellectual Property Office launched the comprehensive database GI View covering food, wine, and spirit GIs. A private database project (GEOPRODUCT directory) intends to provide worldwide coverage. Accusations of 'unfair' competition should although be levelled with caution since the use of GIs sometimes comes from European immigrants who brought their traditional methods and skills with them.

=== Paris convention and Lisbon agreement ===
International trade made it important to try to harmonize the different approaches and standards that governments used to register GIs. The first attempts to do so were found in the Paris Convention on trademarks (1883, still in force, 176 members), followed by a much more elaborate provision in the 1958 Lisbon Agreement on the Protection of Appellations of Origin and their Registration. About 9000 geographical indications were registered by Lisbon Agreement members.

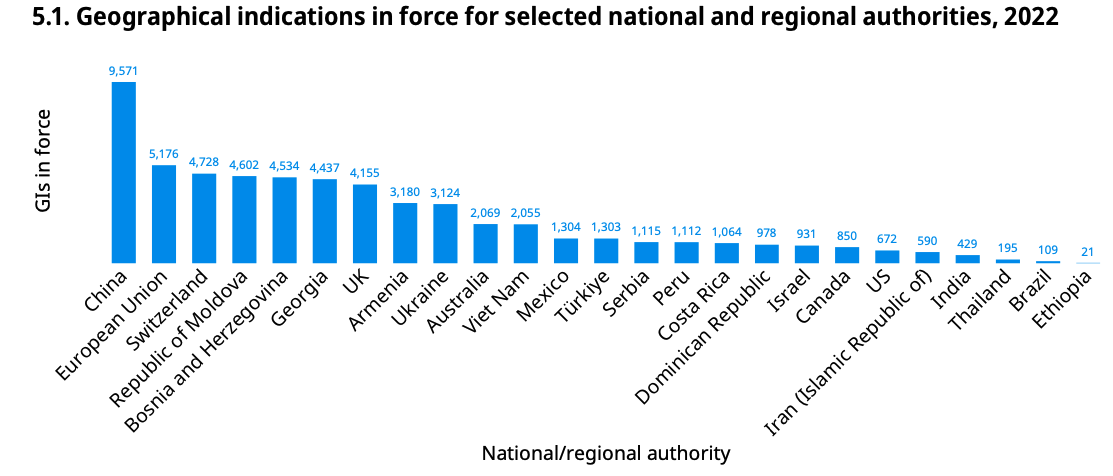
Estimated geographical Indications in force for selected national and regional authorities in 2022

According to WIPO World Intellectual Property Indicators 2023, with data received from 91 national and regional authorities, there were an estimated 58400 protected GI in existence in 2022. Of the 58,400 GIs in force in 2022, upper middle-income economies accounted for 46.3% of the world total, followed by high-income (43.1%) and lower middle-income economies (10.6%). In terms of regional distribution, Europe had the most GIs in force, amounting to 53.1%, followed by Asia (36.3%), Latin America and the Caribbean (4.3%), Oceania (3.6%), North America (2.6%) and Africa 0.1%. Figures should nevertheless be interpreted with caution as GIs can be protected through many different means, sui generis systems, trademark systems, other national legal means, regional systems and international agreements (e.g., Lisbon and Madrid systems).

=== Agreement on Trade-Related Aspects of Intellectual Property Rights ===
The WTO Agreement on Trade-Related Aspects of Intellectual Property Rights ("TRIPS") defines "geographical indications" as indications that identify a good as "originating in the territory of a Member, or a region or locality in that territory, where a given quality, reputation or other characteristic of the good is essentially attributable to its geographic origin."

In 1994, when negotiations on the WTO TRIPS were concluded, governments of all WTO member countries (164 countries, as of August 2016) had agreed to set certain basic standards for the protection of GIs in all member countries. There are, in effect, two basic obligations on WTO member governments relating to GIs in the TRIPS agreement:

1. Article 22 of the TRIPS Agreement says that all governments must provide legal opportunities in their own laws for the owner of a GI registered in that country to prevent the use of marks that mislead the public as to the geographical origin of the good. This includes prevention of use of a geographical name which although literally true "falsely represents" that the product comes from somewhere else.
2. Article 23 of the TRIPS Agreement says that all governments must provide the owners of GI the right, under their laws, to prevent the use of a geographical indication identifying wines not originating in the place indicated by the geographical indication. This applies even where the public is not being misled, where there is no unfair competition and where the true origin of the good is indicated or the geographical indication is accompanied by expressions such as "kind", "type", "style", "imitation" or the like. Similar protection must be given to geographical indications identifying spirits.

Article 22 of TRIPS also says that governments may refuse to register a trademark or may invalidate an existing trademark (if their legislation permits or at the request of another government) if it misleads the public as to the true origin of a good. Article 23 says governments may refuse to register or may invalidate a trademark that conflicts with a wine or spirits GI whether the trademark misleads or not.

Article 24 of TRIPS provides a number of exceptions to the protection of geographical indications that are particularly relevant for geographical indications for wines and spirits (Article 23). For example, Members are not obliged to bring a geographical indication under protection where it has become a generic term for describing the product in question. Measures to implement these provisions should not prejudice prior trademark rights that have been acquired in good faith; and, under certain circumstances — including long-established use — continued use of a geographical indication for wines or spirits may be allowed on a scale and nature as before.

=== Post-TRIPS Agreement ===
Creation of a geographical indicator register for wines and spirits, as well as a geographical indication extension to products other than wine and spirits, have been important issues on the WTO's agenda since the TRIPS Agreement. In the Doha Development Round of WTO negotiations, launched in December 2001, WTO member governments are negotiating on the creation of a 'multilateral register' of geographical indications. Some countries, including the EU, are pushing for a register with legal effect, while other countries, including the United States, are pushing for a non-binding system under which the WTO would simply be notified of the members' respective geographical indications.

Some governments participating in the negotiations (especially the European Communities) wish to go further and negotiate the inclusion of GIs on products other than wines and spirits under Article 23 of TRIPS. These governments argue that extending Article 23 will increase the protection of these marks in international trade. This is a controversial proposal, however, that is opposed by other governments including the United States who question the need to extend the stronger protection of Article 23 to other products. They are concerned that Article 23 protection is greater than required, in most cases, to deliver the consumer benefit that is the fundamental objective of GIs laws.

=== Geneva Act of the Lisbon Agreement ===
In 2015, The Geneva Act was adopted. It entered into force early-2020 with the accession of the European Union. The Geneva Act bridges the Lisbon system of Appellations of Origin, and the TRIPS system of Geographical Indications.

== Examples ==
- Scotch whisky: Whisky distilled and matured in Scotland under strict regulations.
- Champagne: Sparkling wine produced exclusively in the Champagne region of France.
- Tequila: Spirit from blue agave grown in designated regions of Mexico.
- Kente Cloth: Fabric produced throughout Africa and the diaspora with Ghana holding geographic protections for the authentic product.
- Parmigiano Reggiano: Hard cheese produced in the provinces of Parma, Reggio Emilia, Modena, Bologna, and Mantua in Italy.
- Darjeeling tea: Tea grown in the Darjeeling district of West Bengal, India.
- Kobe beef: Beef from Tajima strain Wagyu cattle raised in Japan's Hyōgo Prefecture.
- Roquefort: Blue cheese made from sheep's milk and aged in the natural caves of Roquefort-sur-Soulzon, France.

== Differences between European and American systems ==
One reason for the conflicts that occur between European Union and United States governments is a difference in philosophy as to what constitutes a "genuine" product. In Europe, the prevailing theory is that of terroir: that there is a specific property of a geographical area, and that dictates a strict usage of geographical designations. The European Union has been successful internally in promoting geographical indications as intellectual property. Producers from a designated place can exclude those who produce elsewhere from using the geographical name for similar products.

Historically, European immigrants to countries such as the United States, Canada, Australia, and New Zealand brought production of place-name related items to their new homes. In these countries, the place named products became generic product names that were not restricted in their use. This difference causes most of the conflict between the United States and Europe in their attitudes toward geographical names. The US generally opposes EU-style geographical indication regulation because place names have either already been registered as trademarks or lost their distinctiveness through generic use. Disagreements on geographical indications is one of the few areas in global intellectual property governance where the EU and the US oppose each other. This dispute has been called sometimes the “war on terroir”.

However, there is some overlap, particularly with American products adopting a European way of viewing the matter. The most notable of these are crops: Vidalia onions, Florida oranges, and Idaho potatoes. In each of these cases, the state governments of Georgia, Florida, and Idaho registered trademarks, and then allowed their growers—or in the case of the Vidalia onion, only those in a certain, well-defined geographical area within the state—to use the term, while denying its use to others. The European conception is increasingly gaining acceptance in American viticulture; also, vintners in the various American Viticultural Areas are attempting to form well-developed and unique identities as New World wine gains acceptance in the wine community. Finally, the United States has a long tradition of placing relatively strict limitations on its native forms of whiskey; particularly notable are the requirements for labeling a product "straight whiskey" (which requires the whiskey to be produced in the United States in accordance with certain standards) and the requirement, enforced by federal law and several international agreements, (NAFTA, among them) that a product labeled Tennessee whiskey be a straight Bourbon whiskey produced in the state of Tennessee.

Conversely, some European products have adopted a more American system: a prime example is Newcastle Brown Ale, which received an EU protected geographical status in 2000. When the brewery moved from Tyneside to Tadcaster in North Yorkshire (about 150 km away) in 2007 for economic reasons, the status had to be revoked.

China has adopted geographical indication from European law, but did not keep the terroir approach, instead drawing on EU law's analysis of the relevant public to apply trademark law principles. Under China Supreme Court rules, disputes over disputed geographical indication marks must be resolved based on whether the public may be misled into thinking products originate from a particular region. Academic commentators argue that China's approach of using two types of law for the same matter creates conflicts.

== See also ==
- Appellation (wine)
- Country of origin
- Geographical Indication Registry (India)
- Geographical Indications of Goods (Registration and Protection) Act, 1999
- Protected Geographical Status (European Union)
- Terroir

== Notes ==
1.See also the Paris Convention, the Madrid Agreement, the Lisbon Agreement, the Geneva Act.

== Sources ==
This article incorporates text from a free content work. Licensed under CC BY 3.0 IGO (license statement/permission). Text taken from Geographical indications An introduction, 2nd edition, WIPO, WIPO.
