= China Trademark Office =

The Trademark Office of China is the constituent department of the China National Intellectual Property Administration that is responsible for administering trademarks. As of June 2023, Cui Shoudong (崔守东) was the head of the Trademark Office.

The China Trademark office makes decisions on issuing and revoking trademarks. Under China's trademark regulations, all applications for international trademark registration must be submitted through the Trademark Office. It is responsible for maintaining an official register of trademarks, processing recordation of license filings, and designing standard documents for trademark recordation. Regulations also make the office responsible for maintaining an online system. It also has authority to regulate trademark service providers, by establishing credit profiles and issuing public notice of violations by trademark agents.

== See also ==
- Trademark Law of the People's Republic of China
- Overview of the China Trademark Office
