= International (Nice) Classification of Goods and Services =

System of classifying goods and services

International Classification of Goods and Services also known as the Nice Classification was established by the Nice Agreement (1957), is a system of classifying goods and services for the purpose of registering trademarks. It is updated every five years and its latest 11th version of the system groups products into 45 classes (classes 1-34 include goods and classes 35-45 embrace services), and allows users seeking to trademark a good or service to choose from these classes as appropriate. Since the system is recognized in numerous countries, this makes applying for trademarks internationally a more streamlined process. The classification system is specified by the World Intellectual Property Organization (WIPO).

== History of the Nice Classification ==
The Nice Classification is based on a multilateral treaty administered by WIPO. This treaty, consummated on 15 June 1957 in Nice, France, is called the "Nice Agreement Concerning the International Classification of Goods and Services for the Purposes of the Registration of Marks". This Classification is commonly referred to as the "Nice Classification". The Nice Agreement is open to states who are parties to the "Paris Convention for the Protection of Industrial Property".

== Contracting states ==
The following is a list of states with their date of accession and ratification (as of 2023).

- Albania (2003)
- Algeria (1972)
- Argentina (2007)
- Armenia (2004)
- Australia (1972)
- Austria (1973)
- Azerbaijan (2003)
- Bahrain (2005)
- Barbados (1984)
- Belarus (1998)
- Belgium (1974)
- Benin (1978)
- Bosnia and Herzegovina (1993)
- Bulgaria (2000)
- Canada (2019)
- Chile
- China (1994)
- Croatia (1992)
- Cuba (1995)
- Czech Republic (1970)
- Democratic People's Republic of Korea (1997)
- Denmark (1970)
- Dominica (2000)
- Egypt (2005)
- Estonia (1996)
- Finland (1973)
- France
- Georgia (2002)
- Germany (1970)
- Greece
- Guinea (1996)
- Hungary (1970)
- Iceland (1995)
- Ireland (1968)
- Israel (1969)
- India (2019)
- Indonesia (2023)
- Italy (1977)
- Jamaica (2005)
- Japan (1989)
- Kazakhstan (2002)
- Kyrgyzstan (1998)
- Latvia (1994)
- Lebanon
- Liechtenstein (1972)
- Lithuania (1996)
- Luxembourg (1974)
- Malawi (1995)
- Malaysia (2007)
- Mexico (2000)
- Moldova (1997)
- Monaco (1975)
- Mongolia (2001)
- Montenegro (2006)
- Morocco (1975)
- Mozambique (2001)
- Netherlands (1979)
- New Zealand (2013)
- Norway (1970)
- Paraguay (2021)
- Peru (2022)
- Philippines
- Poland (1996)
- Portugal (1982)
- Republic of Korea (1998)
- Republic of Macedonia (1993);
- Romania (1998)
- Russian Federation (1992)
- Saint Kitts and Nevis (2005)
- Saint Lucia (2000)
- Saudi Arabia (2021)
- Serbia (2006)
- Singapore (1998)
- Sint Maarten
- Slovakia (1993)
- Slovenia (1992)
- Spain (1979)
- Suriname (1981)
- Sweden (1969)
- Switzerland (1970)
- Syrian Arab Republic (2004)
- Tajikistan (1994)
- Trinidad and Tobago (1995)
- Tunisia
- Turkey (1995)
- Turkmenistan (2006)
- Ukraine (2000)
- United Arab Emirates (2022)
- United Kingdom (1979)
- United Republic of Tanzania (1999)
- United States of America (1972)
- Uruguay (1999)
- Uzbekistan (2001)

In 2026, there are 96 contracting parties.

== Application ==
The trademark offices of the nations signatory to the Nice Agreement agree to employ the designated classification codes in their official documents and publications.

== Advantages and uniqueness of the Nice Classification ==
Use of the Nice Classification by national offices has the advantage that trademark applications are coordinated with reference to a single classification system. Filing is thereby greatly simplified, as the goods and services to which a given mark applies will be classified the same in all countries that have adopted the system. That the Nice Classification exists in several languages also saves applicants a considerable amount of work when filing internationally.

== Worldwide use ==
As of January 2014, there were 84 signatory nations to the Nice Agreement; these countries have officially adopted the Nice Classification and apply it in the registration of trademarks. In addition, 65 non-member countries, four organizations and the International Bureau of WIPO also use the Nice Classification.

Several Asian countries use grouping codes alongside the Nice Classification. For example, Japan uses codes that provide conceptual subdivisions of the Nice classes. China’s trademark administrative regulations also require the trademark office to apply a national goods and services classification table that further subdivides the Nice classes.

== Updating the treaty ==
The Nice Classification is continuously revised by a "Committee of Experts", whose membership is representative of all signatory states, and a new edition is published every five years. The current (twelfth) edition has been in effect since 1 January 2023.

== List of Classes (11th edition) ==
=== GOODS ===
Class 1 Chemicals used in industry, science and photography, as well as in agriculture, horticulture and forestry; unprocessed artificial resins, unprocessed plastics; manures; fire extinguishing compositions; tempering and soldering preparations; chemical substances for preserving foodstuffs; tanning substances; adhesives used in industry

Class 2 Paints, varnishes, lacquers; preservatives against rust and against deterioration of wood; colorants; mordants; raw natural resins; metals in foil and powder form for use in painting, decorating, printing and art

Class 3 Bleaching preparations and other substances for laundry use; cleaning, polishing, scouring and abrasive preparations; non-medicated soaps; perfumery, essential oils, non-medicated cosmetics, non-medicated hair lotions; non-medicated dentifrices

Class 4 Industrial oils and greases; lubricants; dust absorbing, wetting and binding compositions; fuels (including motor spirit) and illuminants; candles and wicks for lighting

Class 5 Pharmaceuticals, medical and veterinary preparations; sanitary preparations for medical purposes; dietetic food and substances adapted for medical or veterinary use, food for babies; dietary supplements for humans and animals; plasters, materials for dressings; material for stopping teeth, dental wax; disinfectants; preparations for destroying vermin; fungicides, herbicides

Class 6 Common metals and their alloys, ores; metal building materials for building and construction; transportable buildings of metal; materials of metal for railway tracks; non-electric cables and wires of common metal; ironmongery, small items of metal hardware; pipes and tubes of metal;metal containers for storage or transport; safes;; ores

Class 7 Machines and machine tools; motors and engines (except for land vehicles); machine coupling and transmission components (except for land vehicles); agricultural implements other than hand-operated; incubators for eggs; automatic vending machines

Class 8 Hand tools and implements (hand-operated); cutlery; side arms; razors

Class 9 Scientific, nautical, surveying, photographic, cinematographic, optical, weighing, measuring, signalling, checking (supervision), life-saving and teaching apparatus and instruments; apparatus and instruments for conducting, switching, transforming, accumulating, regulating or controlling electricity; apparatus for recording, transmission or reproduction of sound or images; magnetic data carriers, recording discs; compact discs, DVDs and other digital recording media; mechanisms for coin-operated apparatus; cash registers, calculating machines, data processing equipment, computers; computer software; fire-extinguishing apparatus

Class 10 Surgical, medical, dental and veterinary apparatus and instruments; artificial limbs, eyes and teeth; orthopaedic articles; suture materials; therapeutic and assistive devices adapted for the disabled; massage apparatus; apparatus, devices and articles for nursing infants; sexual activity apparatus, devices and articles

Class 11 Apparatus for lighting, heating, steam generating, cooking, refrigerating, drying, ventilating, water supply and sanitary purposes

Class 12 Vehicles; apparatus for locomotion by land, air or water

Class 13 Firearms; ammunition and projectiles; explosives; fireworks

Class 14 Precious metals and their alloys; jewellery, precious and semi-precious stones; horological and chronometric instruments

Class 15 Musical instruments

Class 16 Paper and cardboard; printed matter; bookbinding material; photographs; stationery and office requisites, except furniture; adhesives for stationery or household purposes; artists’ and drawing materials; paintbrushes; typewriters and office requisites (except furniture); instructional and teaching materials (except apparatus); plastic materials forsheets, films and bags for wrapping and packaging; printers’ type; printing blocks

Class 17 Unprocessed and semi-processed rubber, gutta-percha, gum, asbestos, mica and substitutes for all these materials; plastics and resins in extruded form for use in manufacture; packing, stopping and insulating materials; flexible pipes, tubes and hoses, not of metal

Class 18 Leather and imitations of leather; animal skins, and hides; trunks and travellingluggage and carrying bags; umbrellas and parasols; walking sticks; whips, harness and saddlery; collars, leashes and clothing for animals

Class 19 Building materials (non-metallic); non-metallic rigid pipes for building; asphalt, pitch and bitumen; non-metallic transportable buildings; monuments, not of metal

Class 20 Furniture, mirrors, picture frames; containers, not of metal, for storage or transport; unworked or semi-worked bone, horn, ivory, whalebone or mother-of-pearl; shells; meerschaum; yellow amber

Class 21 Household or kitchen utensils and containers; combs and sponges; brushes, (except paintbrushes); brush-making materials; articles for cleaning purposes; steelwool; unworked or semi-worked glass, (except building glass used in building); glassware, porcelain and earthenware

Class 22 Ropes and string; nets; tents, awnings, and tarpaulins; awnings of textile or synthetic materials; sails; sacks for the transport and storage of materials in bulk; padding, cushioning and stuffing materials, (except of paper, cardboard, rubber or plastics); raw fibrous textile materials and substitutes therefor

Class 23 Yarns and threads, for textile use

Class 24 Textiles and substitutes for textiles; bed covers; table covershousehold linen; curtains of textile or plastic

Class 25 Clothing, footwear, headgear

Class 26 Lace and embroidery, ribbons and braid; buttons, hooks and eyes, pins and needles; artificial flowers; hair decorations; false hair

Class 27 Carpets, rugs, mats and matting, linoleum and other materials for covering existing floors; wall hangings (non-textile)

Class 28 Games, toys and playthings; video game apparatus; gymnastic and sporting articles; decorations for Christmas trees

Class 29 Meat, fish, poultry and game; meat extracts; preserved, frozen, dried and cooked fruits and vegetables; jellies, jams, compotes; eggs; milk and milk products; edible oils and fats

Class 30 Coffee, tea, cocoa and artificial coffee; rice; tapioca and sago; flour and preparations made from cereals; bread, pastries and confectionery; edible ices; sugar, honey, treacle; yeast, baking-powder; salt; mustard; vinegar, sauces (condiments); spices; ice

Class 31 Raw and unprocessed agricultural, aquacultural, horticultural and forestry products; raw and unprocessed grains and seeds; fresh fruits and vegetables, fresh herbs; natural plants and flowers; bulbs, seedlings and seeds for planting; live animals; foodstuffs and beverages for animals; malt

Class 32 Beers; mineral and aerated waters and other non-alcoholic beverages; fruit beverages and fruit juices; syrups and other preparations for making beverages

Class 33 Alcoholic beverages (except beers)

Class 34 Tobacco; smokers’ articles; matches

=== SERVICES ===
Class 35 Advertising; business management; business administration; office functions

Class 36 Insurance; financial affairs; monetary affairs; real estate affairs

Class 37 Building construction; repair; installation services

Class 38 Telecommunications

Class 39 Transport; packaging and storage of goods; travel arrangement

Class 40 Treatment of materials

Class 41 Education; providing of training; entertainment; sporting and cultural activities

Class 42 Scientific and technological services and research and design relating thereto; industrial analysis and research services; design and development of computer hardware and software

Class 43 Services for providing food and drink; temporary accommodation

Class 44 Medical services; veterinary services; hygienic and beauty care for human beings or animals; agriculture, horticulture and forestry services

Class 45 Legal services; security services for the physical protection of tangible property and individuals; personal and social services rendered by others to meet the needs of individuals

== See also ==
- Madrid System
- World Intellectual Property Organization
