= Madrid Protocol =

International trademark registration system

The Madrid System, also known as the Madrid Protocol, is the primary international system for facilitating the registration of trademarks in multiple jurisdictions around the world. It was established pursuant to the multilateral treaties Madrid Agreement Concerning the International Registration of Marks of 1891 and the Protocol Relating to the Madrid Agreement (1989), which has been the sole governing treaty since 2016.

The Madrid System provides a centrally administered system for obtaining multiple trademark registrations in separate jurisdictions; it does not create a single unified registration across different jurisdictions, as in the case of the European Union trademark system. Rather, applicants file a single international trademark application and pay one set of fees to apply for protection in any or all countries that are members of the system; each country has discretion to grant the application. Once the trademark authority of a designated country grants protection, the mark is protected in that jurisdiction just as if that office had registered it.

The Madrid System is administered by the International Bureau of the United Nations World Intellectual Property Organization (WIPO) in Geneva, Switzerland. As of May 2025, the Madrid System consists of 115 members covering 131 countries; known collectively as the Madrid Union, they represent more than 80% of world trade.

== History and development ==
The Madrid system comprises two treaties; the Madrid Agreement Concerning the International Registration of Marks, (Note: The full name of the Madrid Agreement is the "Madrid Agreement Concerning the International Registration of Marks of April 14, 1891 (as revised at Brussels on December 14, 1900, at Washington on June 2, 1911, at The Hague on November 6, 1925, at London on June 2, 1934, at Nice on June 15, 1957, and at Stockholm on July 14, 1967, and as amended on September 28, 1979)".) which was concluded in 1891, and entered into force in 1892, and the Protocol Relating to the Madrid Agreement, which came into operation on 1 April 1996. The Madrid Agreement and Madrid Protocol were adopted at diplomatic conferences held in Madrid, Spain.

The Madrid Agreement was originally intended to provide for an international registration system, but did not achieve this for two significant reasons:

- The lack of international acceptance. Many non-member countries, including the United Kingdom, the United States, and Central American, South American and Asian countries, such as Japan, were not adherents, which undermined recognition of the system as a truly "international" regime. Significantly, many of these countries represent the largest numbers of trademark filings and registrations in the world; and
- The mere forwarding by the International Bureau of a uniform application to member countries, rather than the registration of the applicable trademark in the national trademark registers, precludes an actual "registration" system.

Some of the large trading nations like the United States, Japan, and Canada, which have a large number of filings at the national level, did not join the Madrid Agreement due to another perceived flaw in the system: if the home registration upon which an international registration was based came under 'central attack', the international registration would be cancelled or limited to the same extent that the home registration was cancelled or limited.

During 1966 and 1967, attempts were made to address this issue by establishing a new treaty that would reflect the need of the times rather than the world of the 1890s when the agreement was adopted. This led to the drafting of the Trademark Registration Treaty (TRT) which was adopted in Vienna in 1973, and entered into effect in 1980, with five contracting states, namely, Burkina Faso, Congo, Gabon, Soviet Union and Togo. In the absence of more accessions to the TRT and the low number of registrations since its inception, it was clear that the TRT was unlikely to supplant the Madrid Agreement.

As the realization of the introduction of a multi-jurisdictional (or at least pan-European) European Community Trade Mark (CTM) approached, the relevancy of the Madrid system came under scrutiny. Pressure increased on WIPO to maintain its relevance and strengthen the agreement by increasing membership, possibly through amendments. This culminated in the introduction of the Madrid Protocol, pursuant to which a CTM registration could be a 'foundation' or 'home' registration upon which an international registration could then be established. This mechanism is referred to as a "linking provision." The Protocol, after considerable lobbying efforts by WIPO, was signed by many countries, including most of the present members of the Madrid Agreement, and some countries that are members of the European Union, but were not members of the Madrid Agreement. The Protocol entered into force on 1 December 1995, and became operative on 1 April 1996.

Many countries have needed to modify or consider modifying their trademark laws in order to adhere to the Protocol, in addition to the modifications required by GATT-TRIPS/WTO.

In Europe, resistance to the Protocol was brought by trademark attorneys who were afraid of losing business because a Community Trade Mark application could be filed directly through the Madrid Protocol process. In the United States, the proposal bogged down due to a trademark dispute between two businesses who were heavy campaign contributors to certain Congressmen, followed by a repeated reshuffling of the Senate due to elections and a subsequent defection of a Republican senator. The treaty was eventually ratified during the presidency of George W. Bush. With the accession of the U.S. and EU to the Madrid Protocol on 2 November 2003, and 1 October 2004, respectively, most major trading jurisdictions have joined the Madrid system.

On 31 July 2015, Algeria deposited its instrument of accession and acceded to the Madrid Protocol on 31 October 2015; as Algeria was the last member of the Madrid system to adhere to the protocol, the protocol became effective across the entire Madrid system.

== Members ==
Madrid Union members (green) and jurisdictions that are not members but are members of either OAPI or the EU (blue).

Adherence to the convention or the protocol includes membership of the "Madrid Union." As of March 2026, there are 116 members made up from 132 countries. The original treaty has 55 members, all of which are also party to the protocol (when Algeria joined the Madrid Protocol on 31 October 2015, all of the members of the Madrid Agreement were also members of the Madrid Protocol and many of the aspects of the Madrid Agreement ceased to have any practical effect). The term 'Madrid Union' can be used to describe those jurisdictions party to either the agreement or the protocol (or both).

The protocol has been in operation since 1996 and has 100 members making it more popular than the agreement, which has been in operation for more than 110 years and has 55 members.

Table of Madrid Union members with year of accession to the agreement and protocol, as applicable
Contracting party	Agreement	Protocol
Afghanistan		2018
African Intellectual Property Organization (OAPI)		2015
Albania	1995	2003
Algeria	1972	2015
Antigua and Barbuda		2000
Armenia	1991	2000
Australia		2001
Austria	1909	1999
Azerbaijan	1995	2007
Bahrain		2005
Belarus	1991	2002
Belgium (Note: Benelux is considered one country for Madrid-system purposes.)	1892	1998
Bhutan	2000	2000
Bosnia and Herzegovina	1992	2009
Botswana		2006
Brazil		2019
Brunei Darussalam		2017
Bulgaria	1985	2001
Cabo Verde		2022
Cambodia		2015
Canada		2019
Chile		2022
China (Note: Excluding Hong Kong and Macao.)	1989	1995
Colombia		2012
Croatia	1991	2004
Cuba	1989	1995
Cyprus	2003	2003
Czech Republic	1993	1996
North Korea	1980	1996
Denmark (Note: Including Greenland and the Faroe Islands.)		1996
Egypt	1952	2009
Estonia		1998
Eswatini	1998	1998
European Union (Note: Malta is the only member state of the EU that is not also a member of the Madrid Union; an EUTM obtained via Madrid will cover Malta.)		2004
Finland		1996
France	1892	1997
The Gambia		2015
Georgia		1998
Germany	1922	1996
Ghana		2008
Greece		2000
Hungary	1909	1997
Iceland		1997
India		2013
Indonesia		2018
Iran	2003	2003
Ireland		2001
Israel		2010
Italy	1894	2000
Jamaica		2022
Japan		2000
Kazakhstan	1991	2010
Kenya	1998	1998
Kyrgyzstan	1991	2004
Lao People's Democratic Republic		2016
Latvia	1995	2000
Lebanon	2007	2025
Lesotho	1999	1999
Liberia	1995	2009
Liechtenstein	1933	1998
Lithuania		1997
Luxembourg	1924	1998
Madagascar		2008
Malawi		2018
Malaysia		2019
Mexico		2013
Monaco	1956	1996
Mongolia	1985	2001
Montenegro	2006	2006
Morocco	1917	1999
Mozambique	1998	1998
Namibia	2004	2004
Netherlands (Note: Including Curaçao, the Caribbean Netherlands, and Sint Maarten, which have registries independent of the unified Benelux office; excluding Aruba.)	1893	1998
New Zealand (Note: Excluding Tokelau.)		2012
North Macedonia	1991	2002
Norway		1996
Oman		2007
Philippines		2012
Poland	1991	1997
Portugal	1893	1997
South Korea		2003
Republic of Moldova	1991	1997
Romania	1920	1998
Russian Federation	1976	1997
Rwanda		2013
Samoa		2019
San Marino	1960	2007
Sao Tome and Principe		2008
Serbia	1992	1998
Sierra Leone	1997	1999
Singapore		2000
Slovakia	1993	1997
Slovenia	1991	1998
Spain	1892	1995
Sudan	1984	2010
Sweden		1995
Switzerland	1892	1997
Syrian Arab Republic		2004
Tajikistan	1991	2011
Thailand		2017
Trinidad and Tobago		2020
Tunisia		2013
Turkey		1999
Turkmenistan		1999
Ukraine	1991	2000
United Kingdom (Note: Including the Isle of Man and (from 1 January 2021) Guernsey and Gibraltar; excluding other Crown Dependencies and British Overseas Territories.)		1995
United States of America		2003
Uzbekistan		2006
Vietnam	1949	2006
Zambia		2001
Zimbabwe		2015

== Advantages ==
The Madrid System allows to file a single international trademark application in one language, and pay one set of fees in one currency, to apply for protection of a brand in multiple territories simultaneously, representing over 80% of world trade. The management of the international trademark portfolio is done centrally and digitally through WIPO.

== Disadvantages ==
One disadvantage of the Madrid system is that any refusal, withdrawal or cancellation of the basic application or basic registration within five years of the registration date of the international registration will lead to the refusal, withdrawal or cancellation of the international registration to the same extent. For example, if a basic application covers 'clothing, headgear and footwear,' and 'headgear' is then deleted from the basic application (for whatever reason), 'headgear' will also be deleted from the international application. Therefore, the protection afforded by the international registration in each designated member jurisdiction will extend only to 'clothing and footwear.' If the basic application is rejected as a whole, the international registration would also be totally refused.

The process of attacking the basic application or basic registration for this purpose is generally known as 'central attack’. Under the Madrid Protocol, the effects of a successful central attack can be mitigated by transforming the international registration into a series of applications in each jurisdiction designated by the international registration, a process known as 'transformation.' Although transformation is an expensive option of last resort, the resulting applications will receive the registration date of the international registration as their filing date. Concerns about the central attack risk have raised concerns around the entire world, with the International Trademark Association in 2024 urging policy action to “limit the adverse effects of the ‘central attack’ and encourage increased use of the Madrid system.”

Some jurisdictions have enacted local laws to proactively circumscribe the adverse effects of the central attack. For example, in China, the trademark regulations introduce rules that limit central attack risks by requiring a stronger domestic basis and domicile restriction. Specifically, China requires that applicant filing an international trademark registration with China as the country of origin must be domiciled or resident in China or be a Chinese national, and must register or file an application to register their mark with the China Trademark Office before they may apply for international trademark registration pursuant to the Madrid Protocol.

The cost savings which usually result from using the Madrid system may be negated by the requirement to use local agents in the applicable jurisdiction if any problems arise.

== See also ==
- Singapore Treaty on the Law of Trademarks
- International (Nice) Classification of Goods and Services
