= Paris Convention for the Protection of Industrial Property =

1883 intellectual property treaty still in force today

Paris Convention
Paris Convention for the Protection of Industrial Property
- Signed: 20 March 1883
- Location: Paris, France
- Effective: 7 July 1884 (1883 version)
- Parties: 181
- Languages: French

Full text
- Paris Convention for the Protection of Industrial Property (1883) at Wikisource

The Paris Convention for the Protection of Industrial Property, signed in Paris, France, on 20 March 1883, is one of the first intellectual property treaties. It established a Union for the protection of industrial property. The convention is in force, with the substantive provisions of the Convention falling into three main categories: national treatment, priority right and common rules.

== Contents ==
=== National treatment ===
According to Articles 2 and 3 of this treaty, juristic and natural persons who are either national of or domiciled in a state party to the Convention shall, as regards the protection of industrial property, enjoy in all the other countries of the Union, the advantages that their respective laws grant to nationals.

In other words, an applicant filing for a patent or a trademark in another country of the Union receives the treatment that the country grants to its own nationals. Furthermore, if the intellectual property right is granted (e.g. if the applicant becomes owners of a patent or of a registered trademark), the owner benefits from the same protections and the same legal remedy against any infringement as if the owner was a national owner of this right.

=== Priority right ===
The "Convention priority right", also called the "Paris Convention priority right" or "Union priority right", was established by Article 4 of the Paris Convention, and is generally regarded as one of the cornerstones of the Paris Convention. It provides that an applicant from one contracting State shall be able to use its first filing date (in one of the contracting States) as the effective filing date in another contracting State, provided that the applicant, or the applicant's successor in title, files a subsequent application within 6 months (for industrial designs and trademarks) or 12 months (for patents and utility models) from the first filing.

=== Temporary protection for goods shown at some international exhibitions ===
Article 11(1) of the Paris Convention requires that the Countries of the Union "grant temporary protection to patentable inventions, utility models, industrial designs, and trademarks, in respect of goods exhibited at official or officially recognized international exhibitions held in the territory of any of them".

If a patent or trademark registration is applied for during the temporary period of protection, the priority date of the application may be counted "from the date of introduction of the goods into the exhibition" rather than from the date of filing of the application, if the temporary protection referred to in Article 11(1) has been implemented in such a manner in national law. There are, however, other means for the Countries of the Union to implement in their national law the temporary protection provided for in Article 11 of the Paris Convention:

It is also possible, for example, in the case of exhibited patentable inventions, to make provision for temporary protection by other means, namely, by prescribing that, during a certain period, such exhibition will not destroy the novelty of the invention and that the person who exhibits the invention will also be protected against usurpation of his invention by third parties. Still another possibility of protection consists in the recognition of a right of prior use in favor of the exhibitor as against possible rights acquired by third parties.

=== Mutual independence of patents and trademarks in the different Countries of the Union ===
According to Articles 4bis and 6 (for patents and trademarks respectively), for foreigners, the application for a patent or the registration of a trademark shall be determined by the member state in accordance with their national law and not by the decision of the country of origin or any other countries. Patent applications and trademark registrations are independent among contracting countries.

== History ==
Following a diplomatic conference in Paris in 1880, the convention was signed there on 20 March 1883 by 11 countries: Belgium, Brazil, France, Guatemala, Italy, the Netherlands, Portugal, El Salvador, the Kingdom of Serbia, Spain and Switzerland. Guatemala, El Salvador and Serbia denounced and reapplied the convention via accession.

The Treaty was revised at Brussels, Belgium, on 14 December 1900, at Washington, United States, on 2 June 1911, at The Hague, Netherlands, on 6 November 1925, at London, on 2 June 1934, at Lisbon, Portugal, on 31 October 1958, and at Stockholm, Sweden, on 14 July 1967. It was amended on 28 September 1979.

== Contracting parties ==
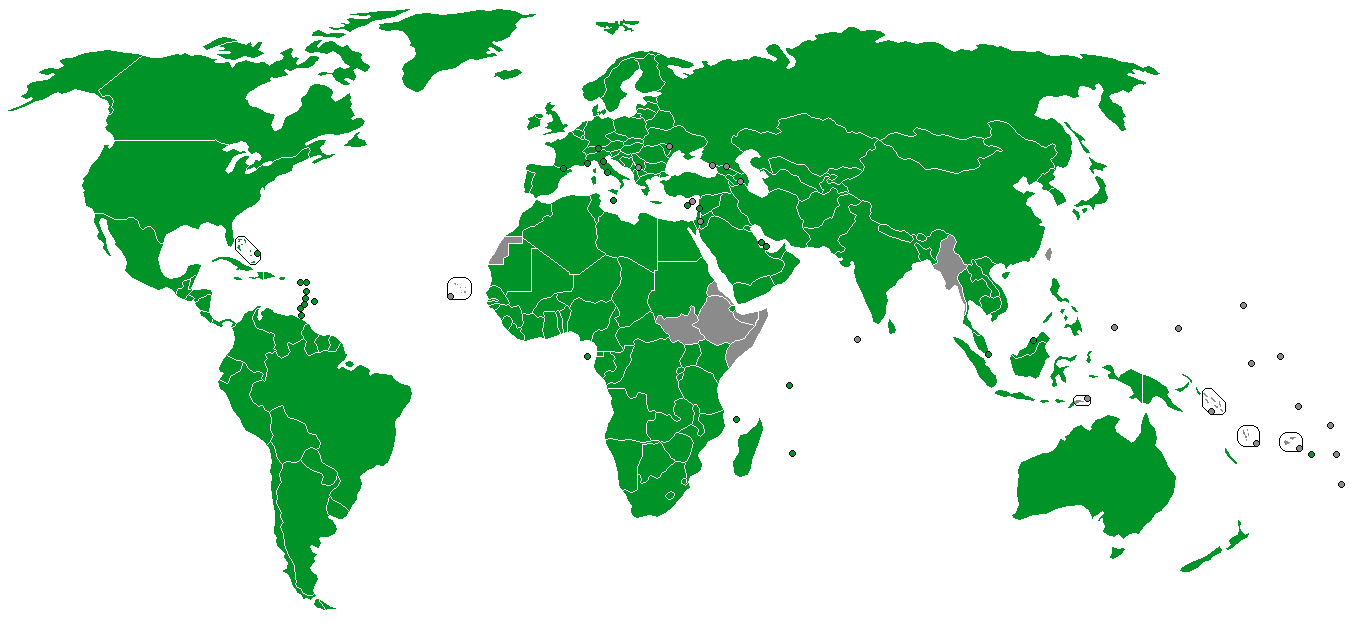
Paris Convention members in 2022 (in green)

As of 15 August 2025, the convention had 181 contracting parties.

== Administration ==
The World Intellectual Property Organization (WIPO), based in Geneva, Switzerland, administers the Paris Convention.

== See also ==
- Agreement on Trade-Related Aspects of Intellectual Property Rights (TRIPs)
- Convention Establishing the World Intellectual Property Organization (WIPO Convention)
- US provisional patent application
- Substantive Patent Law Treaty (SPLT)
