= World Intellectual Property Indicators =

Annual report on intellectual property

- Language: English

Publication details
- History: 2009–present
- Publisher: World Intellectual Property Organization
- Frequency: Annual
- License: CC BY 4.0

Standard abbreviations
- ISO 4: WIPO

Links
- wipo.int/World Intellectual Property Indicators

World Intellectual Property Indicators (WIPI) is an annual statistical report published by the World Intellectual Property Organization (WIPO). The publication provides an overview of the activity in the areas of patents, utility models, trademarks, industrial designs, microorganisms, plant variety protection, geographical indications and the creative economy.

The WIPI draws on intellectual property (IP) statistics collected from the 193 member States of WIPO. It provides the latest trends for IP activity at world, geographical region, country and IP office levels. WIPO has published the report annually since 2009.

== Data sources ==
The IP statistics data presented in the WIPI are taken from the WIPO Statistics Database and based primarily on data collected from national and regional IP offices, other competent authorities and publishers’ associations from around the world, through annual surveys consisting of multiple questionnaires. Data are also compiled by WIPO in processing international applications through the Patent Cooperation Treaty (PCT), the Madrid System for trademark protection and the Hague System for industrial design protection.

Patent family and technology data are extracted from the WIPO Statistics Database and from the PATSTAT database of the European Patent Office (EPO). Gross domestic product, income group classification and population data are from the World Development Indicators database of the World Bank. Geographical regions are those defined by the United Nations.

== Accessing the report and its data ==
The WIPI is available on WIPO website. Its underlying data can be extracted from the IP Statistics Data Center, which is WIPO’s online statistical database.

The IP Facts and Figures report, drawn from the WIPI, serves as a quick reference guide for the most frequently used measure of IP activity. An online statistical country profile also provides a set of IP statistics at the country level

More comprehensive data and analysis on the WIPO administrated Systems are available in a series of three publications: PCT Yearly Review, Madrid Yearly Review and Hague Yearly Review.

== IP Statistics by IP office or by country of origin ==
Applications received by offices from resident and non-resident applicants are referred to as office data, whereas applications filed by applicants at their national or regional office (resident applications) or at a foreign office (applications filed abroad) are referred to as origin data. For statistical purposes, WIPO defines the origin of an IP application to be the country or territory of residence of the first named applicant in the application.

Due to the nature of the regional offices, the WIPI may use an equivalent count concept for some indicators when reporting data by country of origin. When this counting method is used, an application filed at a regional IP office is equivalent to filing an application in every member state of that office. To calculate the number of equivalent applications for the African Intellectual Property Organization (OAPI), the Eurasian Patent Organization (EAPO), the Benelux Office for Intellectual Property (BOIP), the European Union Intellectual Property Office (EUIPO) and the GCC Patent Office, each application is multiplied by the corresponding number of member states. For example, an application filed at the EUIPO in 2022 by an applicant residing outside the EU is counted as 27 applications abroad – equal to the number of EU member countries, whereas an application filed by an EU resident results in a count of 1 resident application and 26 applications abroad. However, the African Regional Intellectual Property Organization (ARIPO), the European Patent Office (EPO) and the Eurasian Patent Organization (EAPO) do not register applications with an automatic region-wide applicability. Therefore, for these offices, each application is counted as one application abroad, if the applicant does not reside within a member state, or as one resident application and one application abroad, if the applicant resides within a member state.

== List (descending order) ==
As of 2024, the following list ranks countries based on their annual patent grants and applications:

Rank	Country	Patent grants	Patent applications	Patent grants per capita
1	China	1,044,777	1,828,054	736.11
2	United States	603,194	603,194	1,746.23
3	Japan	306,855	306,855	2,479.58
4	South Korea	246,245	246,245	4,761.34
5	India	64,941	105,157	44.76
6	Russia	26,698	26,698	184.35
7	Germany	23,944	59,262	283.19
8	Australia	19,276	30,487	721.59
9	United Kingdom	18,952	18,952	274.12
10	Mexico	16,189	16,189	123.71
11	Singapore	13,421	13,421	2,301.12
12	Brazil	12,096	25,597	57.06
13	Turkey	10,351	10,351	118.33
14	Italy	10,308	10,308	173.70
15	Hong Kong	10,123	15,940	1,365.22
16	Vietnam	9,904	9,904	98.07
17	France	9,581	14,129	143.97
18	South Africa	8,899	8,899	139.03
19	Thailand	8,727	8,727	121.77
20	Israel	8,262	8,262	880.15
21	Saudi Arabia	8,029	8,029	236.41
22	New Zealand	5,962	5,962	1,143.47
23	Indonesia	5,812	10,902	20.50
24	Philippines	4,571	4,571	39.46
25	North Korea	4,021	6,936	151.74
26	Luxembourg	3,833	3,833	5,695.09
27	United Arab Emirates	3,598	3,598	326.29
28	Poland	3,453	3,453	89.60
29	Morocco	2,899	2,899	76.13
30	Ukraine	2,559	2,559	67.59
31	Sweden	2,147	2,147	202.41
32	Chile	2,033	3,219	102.86
33	Iran	1,741	8,657	19.01
34	Argentina	1,465	3,591	32.06
35	Switzerland	1,462	1,462	163.86
36	Peru	1,295	1,295	37.85
37	Spain	1,294	1,294	27.01
38	Norway	1,271	1,271	227.91
39	Qatar	1,130	1,130	370.68
40	Kazakhstan	1,121	1,121	54.44
41	Belgium	1,089	1,089	92.77
42	Pakistan	979	979	3.90
43	Colombia	893	1,931	16.89
44	Austria	876	1,835	96.04
45	Oman	855	855	161.88
46	Romania	810	810	42.60
47	Portugal	796	796	76.35
48	Uzbekistan	758	758	20.85
49	Kuwait	683	683	138.41
50	Finland	591	1,829	105.21

== List (alphabetical order) ==
The patent, trademark and industrial design data presented in this table show the filing activity trend by country of origin and by year of filing. Data come from the WIPO Statistics Database, which is the source of the WIPI. The data presented in this table include those received too late to be included in the WIPI and are not based on the equivalent count concept, described above.

Trademark application data refer to class counts – that is, the number of classes specified in applications. This provides the best comparison of international trademark filing activity across origins, because some jurisdictions may allow multiple classes of goods and services to be specified in a single application, whereas others require a separate application for each class. For the same reason, industrial design data refer to design counts, that is, the number of designs contained in applications.

Patents, trademarks, and industrial design filing activity by country of origin
Code	Country	Patent applications in 2024	Patent applications in 2025	Trademarks applications in 2024	Trademarks applications in 2025	Industrial design applications in 2024	Industrial design applications in 2025
AD	Andorra	35	77	1,269	1,473	<NA>	<NA>
AE	United Arab Emirates	1,184	1,640	36,940	47,417	918	583
AG	Antigua and Barbuda	96	28	129	432	2	<NA>
AL	Albania	43	37	2,440	3,650	31	37
AM	Armenia	69	74	8,503	8,624	79	100
AO	Angola	<NA>	9	3,630	4,816	<NA>	84
AR	Argentina	719	1,050	89,047	135,158	1,565	2,749
AT	Austria	10,210	10,498	41,351	41,423	3,726	4,784
AU	Australia	10,633	10,966	127,965	136,858	6,175	5,977
AZ	Azerbaijan	241	367	7,520	8,591	60	58
BA	Bosnia and Herzegovina	59	98	1,917	1,797	264	84
BB	Barbados	100	48	1,246	922	67	33
BD	Bangladesh	116	139	8,180	9,210	959	901
BE	Belgium	10,616	9,951	32,541	37,158	2,736	2,520
BF	Burkina Faso	7	11	372	537	27	17
BG	Bulgaria	421	418	40,057	40,445	2,580	1,202
BH	Bahrain	22	50	860	935	20	27
BJ	Benin	18	5	277	260	6	3
BN	Brunei	3	7	148	288	3	1
BR	Brazil	7,998	9,145	436,232	468,792	6,494	7,584
BT	Bhutan	7	2	286	117	3	7
BW	Botswana	1	<NA>	3,544	2,742	17	15
BY	Belarus	400	407	9,313	9,060	243	374
BZ	Belize	2	6	<NA>	<NA>	11	6
CA	Canada	24,184	25,209	85,006	94,478	4,997	3,496
CF	Central African Republic	2	<NA>	11	3	1	1
CG	Republic of the Congo	2	12	64	83	8	3
CH	Switzerland	41,341	42,749	156,769	150,750	22,698	25,272
CI	Ivory Coast	25	31	1,079	1,660	149	80
CL	Chile	856	944	47,721	57,462	55	103
CM	Cameroon	80	58	759	954	49	40
CN	China	1,796,738	1,910,431	7,314,089	7,374,830	907,420	849,100
CO	Colombia	466	408	38,348	39,884	481	619
CR	Costa Rica	99	85	12,143	14,378	23	10
CU	Cuba	128	70	3,449	4,119	20	5
CV	Cape Verde	1	1	117	166	<NA>	<NA>
CW	Curaçao	<NA>	<NA>	937	1,185	<NA>	<NA>
CY	Cyprus	266	360	18,613	17,857	505	819
CZ	Czech Republic	1,469	1,517	34,255	40,090	2,190	3,055
DE	Germany	133,790	132,714	433,897	478,619	70,262	64,932
DK	Denmark	10,966	11,300	23,666	24,967	3,640	4,691
DM	Dominica	1	<NA>	17	<NA>	<NA>	<NA>
DO	Dominican Republic	24	46	11,369	13,410	13	11
DZ	Algeria	1,117	1,322	16,030	17,477	579	1,342
EC	Ecuador	67	88	14,412	15,988	62	128
EE	Estonia	248	311	7,332	7,648	341	509
EG	Egypt	756	703	71,852	60,194	2,291	2,020
ES	Spain	8,307	8,273	136,443	155,443	19,947	22,596
ET	Ethiopia	69	100	2,848	2,820	105	154
FI	Finland	13,505	17,836	15,811	17,426	2,234	1,951
FJ	Fiji	3	4	152	159	<NA>	<NA>
FR	France	51,880	52,146	362,972	398,086	42,007	35,885
GA	Gabon	9	10	77	73	5	4
GB	United Kingdom	46,840	48,765	348,513	397,868	41,368	40,337
GE	Georgia	109	97	4,418	10,782	473	302
GH	Ghana	<NA>	<NA>	943	1,182	313	484
GM	Gambia	<NA>	<NA>	218	200	<NA>	11
GN	Guinea	2	4	358	468	91	88
GQ	Equatorial Guinea	<NA>	<NA>	14	21	<NA>	<NA>
GR	Greece	853	897	24,416	22,925	1,507	1,176
GT	Guatemala	15	<NA>	10,048	10,875	3	<NA>
GW	Guinea-Bissau	1	1	12	115	5	11
GY	Guyana	3	7	160	235	<NA>	<NA>
HK	Hong Kong	2,841	2,450	54,042	64,575	3,989	3,580
HN	Honduras	10	3	3,927	3,547	<NA>	1
HR	Croatia	230	341	8,042	8,708	640	649
HU	Hungary	1,213	1,191	19,642	21,148	1,148	962
ID	Indonesia	2,164	1,836	131,389	161,686	5,904	6,479
IE	Ireland	6,092	5,940	<NA>	<NA>	1,324	1,070
IL	Israel	15,180	14,238	10,773	10,769	1,948	1,376
IN	India	76,473	105,163	533,412	640,708	39,116	43,682
IQ	Iraq	569	402	2,361	3,430	<NA>	27
IR	Iran	8,434	11,203	304,867	209,385	7,557	6,096
IS	Iceland	294	291	2,643	2,409	33	28
IT	Italy	26,389	27,634	190,332	203,298	63,709	55,031
JM	Jamaica	7	8	2,138	2,182	48	25
JO	Jordan	92	110	7,644	6,306	121	91
JP	Japan	420,991	466,301	340,543	380,311	33,536	32,210
KE	Kenya	416	<NA>	6,321	<NA>	409	<NA>
KG	Kyrgyzstan	75	113	2,206	3,726	15	85
KH	Cambodia	11	<NA>	2,524	<NA>	33	<NA>
KM	Comoros	<NA>	<NA>	60	54	<NA>	<NA>
KN	Saint Kitts and Nevis	6	42	293	221	<NA>	<NA>
KP	North Korea	6,957	6,257	10,008	12,026	<NA>	<NA>
KR	South Korea	296,041	319,210	338,272	350,962	60,175	60,841
KW	Kuwait	88	118	7,022	6,722	249	302
KZ	Kazakhstan	975	1,285	35,996	45,450	424	652
LA	Laos	3	3	1,222	3,187	1	9
LI	Liechtenstein	765	861	2,003	2,284	222	626
LK	Sri Lanka	323	363	9,688	10,305	186	170
LR	Liberia	7	<NA>	272	579	11	3
LT	Lithuania	332	358	9,390	9,922	384	494
LU	Luxembourg	2,291	2,621	12,943	12,105	1,468	1,073
LV	Latvia	192	214	4,672	5,226	218	249
MA	Morocco	421	582	29,311	31,660	5,466	5,156
MC	Monaco	83	105	2,762	3,440	294	96
MD	Moldova	53	68	4,794	5,242	265	295
ME	Montenegro	20	40	<NA>	<NA>	2	11
MG	Madagascar	4	10	3,892	3,728	252	281
MK	North Macedonia	41	<NA>	4,349	<NA>	68	<NA>
ML	Mali	7	15	517	414	26	36
MM	Myanmar	<NA>	8	4,538	5,103	145	322
MN	Mongolia	100	229	10,836	12,007	1,041	862
MO	Macau	12	25	3,612	3,645	91	32
MR	Mauritania	3	9	89	350	<NA>	1
MT	Malta	305	323	8,862	8,651	609	379
MU	Mauritius	330	280	4,299	4,249	129	106
MW	Malawi	2	<NA>	1,127	750	34	32
MX	Mexico	1,913	1,815	170,328	185,210	1,275	1,405
MY	Malaysia	1,708	1,829	29,670	29,425	917	1,028
MZ	Mozambique	11	15	1,533	1,688	97	87
NA	Namibia	21	<NA>	393	<NA>	19	<NA>
NE	Niger	11	5	133	76	2	<NA>
NG	Nigeria	<NA>	<NA>	32,639	45,743	<NA>	<NA>
NL	Netherlands	26,445	26,479	82,700	87,152	9,764	8,414
NO	Norway	4,618	4,584	14,054	17,055	1,151	1,564
NZ	New Zealand	2,357	2,379	29,043	33,603	1,219	1,043
OM	Oman	147	194	8,260	9,537	107	141
PA	Panama	38	67	10,318	10,756	13	33
PE	Peru	270	392	35,859	41,272	170	232
PH	Philippines	1,064	1,129	39,291	39,060	1,217	1,599
PK	Pakistan	528	550	52,596	65,356	647	654
PL	Poland	5,523	5,248	60,946	71,677	7,311	10,089
PT	Portugal	1,744	1,935	41,405	47,556	1,492	1,580
PY	Paraguay	19	10	14,148	16,356	19	<NA>
QA	Qatar	129	133	4,691	3,630	<NA>	<NA>
RO	Romania	1,029	882	36,309	43,338	1,590	1,236
RS	Serbia	285	244	10,248	9,846	319	329
RU	Russia	24,700	24,379	559,675	501,581	9,267	8,840
RW	Rwanda	9	38	1,752	1,567	8	19
SA	Saudi Arabia	6,071	8,017	40,621	49,469	1,425	1,548
SC	Seychelles	50	<NA>	<NA>	1,636	<NA>	<NA>
SE	Sweden	20,756	20,774	43,095	48,992	4,850	5,272
SG	Singapore	10,333	11,214	61,779	77,662	3,070	2,365
SI	Slovenia	608	699	11,328	10,255	465	458
SK	Slovakia	466	429	15,581	15,810	575	770
SL	Sierra Leone	<NA>	<NA>	344	381	<NA>	<NA>
SM	San Marino	85	35	<NA>	<NA>	46	118
SN	Senegal	25	35	851	832	28	23
SO	Somalia	<NA>	<NA>	56	<NA>	<NA>	<NA>
SR	Suriname	<NA>	<NA>	570	<NA>	<NA>	<NA>
ST	São Tomé and Príncipe	<NA>	<NA>	23	44	<NA>	<NA>
SV	El Salvador	7	19	6,871	7,671	16	53
SY	Syria	143	<NA>	<NA>	<NA>	382	<NA>
TD	Chad	4	6	37	68	2	3
TG	Togo	12	4	146	259	2	3
TH	Thailand	1,553	1,683	43,367	45,419	4,883	4,675
TJ	Tajikistan	<NA>	16	926	1,499	<NA>	36
TN	Tunisia	265	336	4,729	5,091	700	505
TO	Tonga	<NA>	<NA>	29	19	<NA>	<NA>
TR	Turkey	11,588	12,961	401,058	380,022	44,021	42,006
TT	Trinidad and Tobago	10	9	728	1,060	45	76
TZ	Tanzania	<NA>	122	2,974	6,255	<NA>	<NA>
UA	Ukraine	1,168	1,269	44,765	49,714	3,075	3,791
UG	Uganda	92	45	2,594	2,718	43	48
US	United States	503,283	489,766	838,612	900,720	67,095	73,091
UY	Uruguay	119	131	7,707	9,063	93	32
UZ	Uzbekistan	526	625	21,123	18,919	302	329
VC	Saint Vincent and the Grenadines	<NA>	<NA>	236	197	<NA>	<NA>
VE	Venezuela	80	17	8,664	9,997	12	25
VN	Vietnam	1,392	1,924	91,632	96,263	2,514	2,585
VU	Vanuatu	1	<NA>	33	35	4	1
WS	Samoa	<NA>	<NA>	680	583	8	32
ZA	South Africa	1,053	1,188	28,067	33,847	698	811
ZM	Zambia	23	35	1,180	1,411	88	113
ZW	Zimbabwe	31	45	910	1,073	34	21

== Countries by active patents ==
As of 2024, the following list ranks countries based on their active patents:

Rank	Country	Active patents
1	China	5,688,867
2	United States	3,519,879
3	Japan	2,085,215
4	South Korea	1,312,294
5	Germany	963,941
6	France	757,026
7	United Kingdom	744,130
8	Italy	382,444
9	Switzerland	268,054
10	Netherlands	246,254
11	Russia	243,943
12	India	228,402
13	Spain	217,849
14	Canada	201,063
15	Ireland	198,100
16	Belgium	187,149
17	Luxembourg	163,418
18	Australia	163,069
19	Sweden	152,158
20	Austria	134,163
21	Monaco	120,437
22	Poland	111,782
23	Mexico	111,190
24	Denmark	109,551
25	Brazil	106,827
26	South Africa	104,012
27	Finland	96,416
28	Turkey	89,401
29	Indonesia	84,540
30	Portugal	81,509

== Controversies ==
=== Taiwanese patents ===
Since Taiwan (ROC) is not a member of the United Nations, the number of patents filed in Taiwan is not reported. The number of patent applications filed with the Taiwan Intellectual Property Office (TIPO) in 2018 was 73,431, which would place it in 6th place worldwide for that year, or 2nd place per capita. In 2014, Bloomberg ranked Taiwan #1 in Patent Activity, using UN data. The last WIPO Indicators report to mention the name Taiwan was in 2017, noting the large number of patents by Foxconn.

China has been criticized for its efforts in the UN to reduce the visibility of Taiwan, including via WIPO; in 2020 Beijing reportedly retaliated to the failed election of a Chinese director-general of the organization by preventing the Wikimedia Foundation from gaining observer status at the WIPO, on the grounds that Wikimedia has a Taiwan subsidiary.

== See also ==
- Top trademark applicants in the Madrid System
- Top patent applicants in the PCT System
- Top industrial design applicants in The Hague System
- Intellectual property analytics
- World Intellectual Property Report
