= WIPO Hague System =

The WIPO Hague System provides an international mechanism for securing and managing design rights simultaneously, in multiple countries and regions, through one application filed directly with WIPO. The resulting international registration provides design owners with the equivalent of a bundle of national or regional registrations. The subsequent management of that international registration – including modifications, updates and renewals – is a single step procedure through WIPO.

== Geographical coverage ==
According to the rules laid out by the Hague Agreement Concerning the International Deposit of Industrial Designs anyone who is a national of – or who has a domicile, habitual residence or real and effective industrial or commercial establishment in – any one of the Hague System's contracting parties can use the Hague System. There is no pre-requirement to file a national or regional design application.

The Hague System comprises 85 contracting parties, covering 114 countries, including all countries of the European Union (EU) and the African Intellectual Property Organization (OAPI). Hague System users can designate as few or as many of these contracting parties as they wish when filing an international application.

== History ==
The origins of the Hague System date back to 1925 with the adoption of the Hague Agreement Concerning the International Deposit of Industrial Designs was signed on November 6, 1925. It established fundamental principles of intellectual property to international industrial design protection. This pioneering international treaty aimed to protect industrial design rights in several countries by creating a centralized international deposit of industrial designs, with simplified legal procedures.

The Hague Agreement was revised in 1934 (London Act) and in 1960 (Hague Act). The Additional Act signed in Monaco in 1961, and the Complementary Act signed in Stockholm in 1967 (amended in 1979), and the Protocol of Geneva (1975), supplemented The Hague Agreement. The most recent revision is the Geneva Act (1999), which is now, the sole Act under which new international design application can be filed.

The London Act clarified the original Agreement’s objectives and introduced improvements to simplify the international design deposit. The International Bureau shall register designs, publish inscriptions and changes in the official periodical journal, and transmit them to national contracting administrations. The London Act intended to encourage more States to accede to the Agreement. The application of the London Act (1934) was frozen with effect from January 1, 2010, and formally terminated on October 18, 2016. However, after renewals of designations, or modifications of registrations made under this Act, all activity, governed by this Act expired on December 31, 2024.

The 1960 Hague Act further improved the Hague System. While preserving the fundamental principles established in 1925 and 1934 - namely that a single international design deposit has the same effect as direct national deposits in member states - the new Act introduced significant changes to key matters, such as protection duration (the standard protection period was reduced from 15 to 10 years, though a protocol preserves the 15-year term for signatory countries to said Protocol), publicity of international registrations (publication of design reproduction in the Bulletin), territorial limitations (designations of countries in which protection is sought), and the ability to submit applications in French or English. The Act also introduced changes to financial and institutional structures. The changes were meant to encourage more participation as the Agreement had limited success and few members.

The application of the 1960 Hague Act was frozen with effect from January 1, 2025; since that date, it has not been possible to file new applications or make new designations under this Act.

The Hague Agreement Concerning the International Registration of Industrial Designs signed on July 2, 1999 in Geneva (the Geneva Act (1999)) is the latest revision of the Hague Agreement. It came into force on December 23, 2003. The Geneva Act (1999) intends to permit a significant expansion of The Hague System, allowing intergovernmental organizations (IGOs) such as the European Union (EU) and the African Intellectual Property Organization (OAPI) to become members. The Act introduced more flexibilities, for example to be better adapted to the needs of countries with substantive examination systems, especially those adhering to the common law.

The 1999 Geneva Act allows countries conducting prior novelty examinations, or with opposition procedures to require unity of design, and to extend the possible refusal period to 12 months. It also extended the standard duration of protection from 10 to 15 years, and increased the possibility for an applicant to require the deferment of the publication of a registration for up to 30 months.

=== Recent history ===
With effect from January 1, 2025, the Common Regulations Under the 1999 Act and the 1960 Act of the Hague Agreement (“Common Regulations”) became the “Regulations Under the Geneva Act (1999) of the Hague Agreement Concerning the International Registration of Industrial Designs.”

Over the past two decades, the Hague System has undergone significant modernization, incorporating advanced technologies such as online tools like “E-filing”, “E-payment” (2008), “E-Renewal” (2010), and an online applications portfolio, with a more flexible payment portal, allowing for simultaneous payment for various WIPO services (2018).

After French (1925) and English (1960), Spanish became a working language of the Hague System in 2010, allowing applicants to submit international applications in one of these three languages.

In 2020, WIPO implemented the Digital Access Service (DAS) for international applications filed under the Hague System.

Since the 1999 Geneva Act, the number of parties adhering to the Hague Agreement has grown considerably, reaching by the end of 2025, 82 Member States.

== Using the Hague System ==
The System is open to all WIPO member states and any intergovernmental organization (IGO) that has:

- at least one member that is also a member of WIPO; and
- an office through which design protection may be obtained, with effect in the territory in which the IGO's constituting treaty applies.

It also:

- extends membership to countries with intellectual property (IP) offices that carry out novelty examination of designs;
- ensures the compatibility between the international registration system and regional systems; and
- offers more features and increased geographical scope.

International design applications are filed directly through WIPO, according to the requirements and procedures established by the Hague Agreement. The domestic legal framework of each designated contracting party governs the design protection provided by the resulting international registrations.

=== The Hague System procedure ===
==== Filing an international application ====
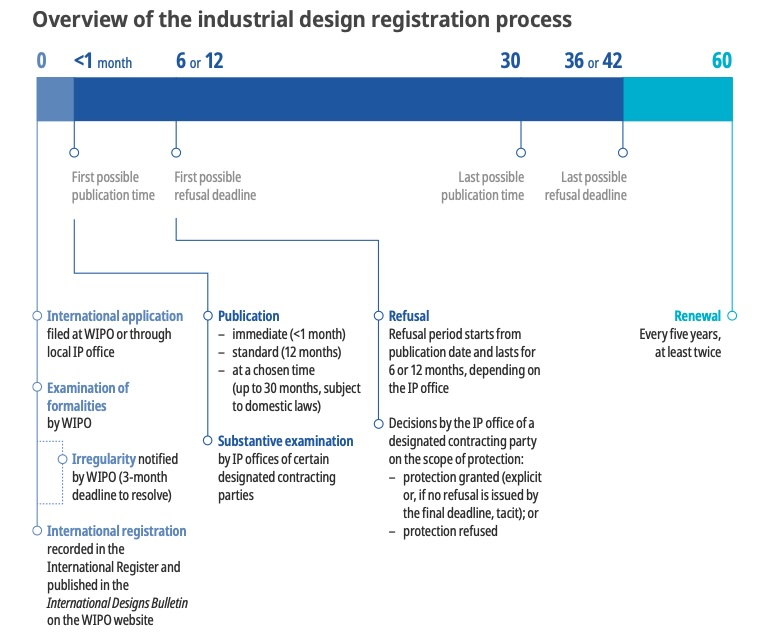
Overview of the registration process

Through the Hague System, applicants file one international application directly with WIPO – in one language and paying in one currency (Swiss francs). They can designate as few or as many of the Hague System's contracting parties as they wish, based on their target markets.

One international application can include up to 100 different designs so long as they belong to the same class of the Locarno Classification – the international classification used for the purposes of registering designs. An international application must contain at least one reproduction (drawing, photo or other graphic representation) of each design included. At least one contracting party must be designated.

Applicants may file an international application online using eHague – the Hague System's online gateway to international design protection. Applications must be filed in English, French or Spanish – the official languages of the Hague System.

Applicants can time publication of their designs to fit their business strategy. Standard publication takes place twelve months after the date of international registration (normally the filing date – the date on which WIPO received the application). Alternatively, immediate publication or publication at a chosen time within 30 months from the filing date (or earliest priority date) may be requested – depending on the domestic laws of the individual designated contracting parties.

==== Formality examination by WIPO ====
WIPO checks each international application to ensure that it complies with formal requirements (necessary information for applicant / representative, quality of reproductions, payment of fees, etc.).

- If the application does not meet the necessary requirements, WIPO sends the applicant an irregularity letter explaining what is missing or faulty. The applicant has three months to fix those irregularities. Beyond this deadline, the application is no longer valid.
- If the application meets all necessary requirements, WIPO records the registration in the International Register and publishes it in the International Designs Bulletin, according to the publication schedule indicated in the international application. WIPO also sends the holder a certificate of international registration.

==== International Designs Bulletin ====
The International Designs Bulletin – released weekly – is the Hague System's official publication of international registrations, containing all data and reproductions of the designs covered in those registrations. It also provides details on renewals of, and decisions and changes pertaining to those registrations. It is the official data reference for the holders of international registrations, the IP offices of the designated contracting parties and the public at large.

==== Substantive examination ====
Once WIPO has published the international registration in the International Designs Bulletin, the IP office of each designated contracting party may perform substantive examination, checking for example the novelty of the design(s).

Each contracting party has the right to refuse the effects of the international registration within its own territory, if it does not meet the substantive requirements of its own domestic law. Refusals cannot be based on formality requirements. Refusal by one contracting party is limited to its own territory and does not affect the international registration in other designated jurisdictions.

WIPO must be notified of any refusal within six (or twelve) months of the date of publication in the International Designs Bulletin. WIPO informs the holder of the registration, who may then take remedial action. Holders must contest refusals at the domestic level, according to the established procedures of the IP office concerned.

In the absence of a refusal, protection is considered granted in a given jurisdiction, under its domestic laws. Some IP offices, though not obliged to do so, issue a Statement of Grant of Protection after completion of substantive examination. When a holder successfully challenges a refusal, the IP office of the contracting party in question must withdraw the refusal, or issue a Statement of Grant of Protection.

==== Managing international registrations ====
Holders can make changes to their international registrations such as updating contact details, making changes to ownership, appointing representatives, requesting renunciation or limitation. International registrations are managed centrally through WIPO meaning that changes automatically apply to all designated contracting parties – except in the case of limitation or renunciation.

Holders make all changes using official Hague System forms. WIPO records the modifications in the International Register and publishes them in the International Designs Bulletin.

==== Renewing international registrations ====
The initial period of protection provided by the Hague System is five years. It is possible to renew an international registration twice. If the legislation of an individual contracting party allows for a longer duration of protection, then this also applies to international registrations.

Holders can renew their registrations online directly through WIPO's eHague platform for as many of the designs included, and in as many of the designated contracting parties, as desired.

== Recent application statistics ==
=== 2024 data ===
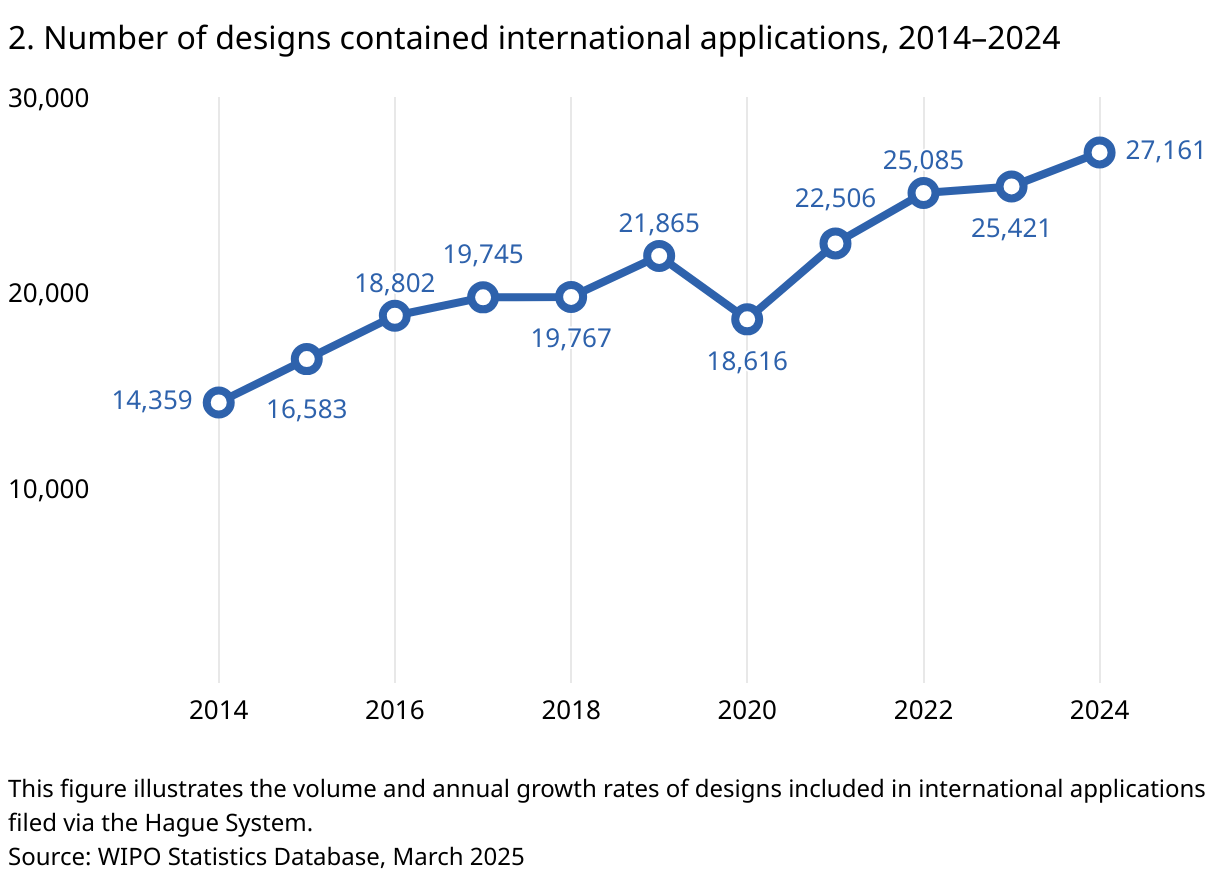
Number of industrial designs international applications through the WIPO Hague System increased for the 4th consecutive year in 2024

According to The Hague Yearly Review 2025, the volume of 2024 design applications increased by 6.8%, the fourth consecutive yearly rise. The WIPO Hague System for the international protection of industrial designs reached its highest with of 27,161 designs applications.

China, which joined the Hague System in 2022, was the leading filer of designs in 2024, with 4,870 filings. This represent a growth of 29,6% compared to previous year, in large part attributable to fillings by Huawei Technologies. The top filling countries after China are Germany (4,218), the US (3,034), Italy (2,249) and finally Switzerland (2,109).

Whilst China, Italy, the Kingdom of the Netherlands, the Republic of Korea, and the US experienced double digit growth compared to previous year, four countries experienced a decline in fillings, with France (–9.3%) recording the sharpest drop, followed by Germany (–6.7%), Japan (–5%) and Switzerland (–3.9%).

Procter & Gamble has taken the lead in design filings, with 641 published designs in applications. Other top five filers were Porsche with 506 designs, LG Electronics with 459, Ferrari with 442, and Huawei Technologies with 431.

In 2024, the average fee per international registration was CHF 2,073.

=== 2023 data ===
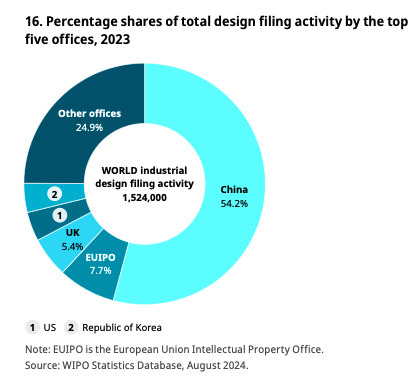
Percentage shares per office in 2023

Statistical data released in 2024 show that approximately 1.2 million industrial design applications were filed worldwide. An estimated 1.5 million designs were contained in these applications, which represents an increase of 2.8% on 2022.

Three-quarters (75.1%) of worldwide industrial design filing occurred at the top five offices in 2023. The office of China alone accounted for 54.2% the world total, primarily as a result of Chinese resident filing.

With 882,807 designs in applications filed, applicants residing in China were the most active in the world in terms of design count in 2023. They were followed by applicants from the US (69,076), Germany (64,986), Italy (60,486), and the South Korea (60,120).

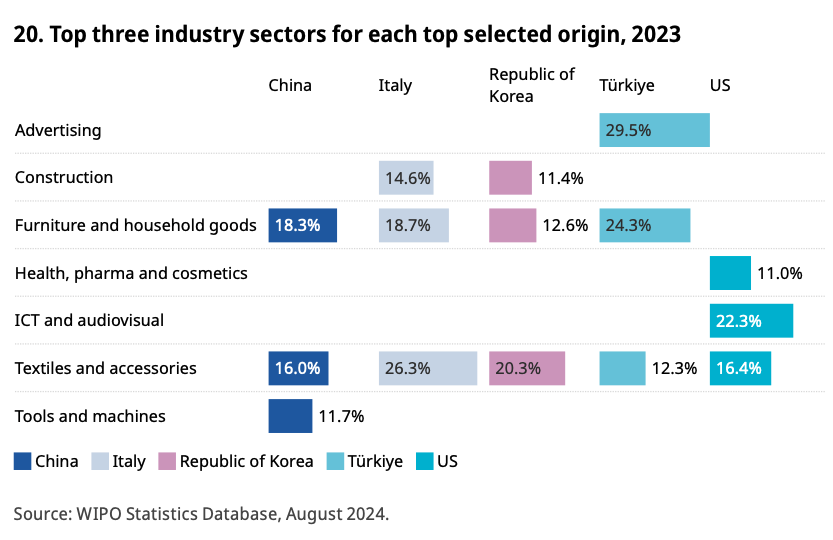
Top three industry sectors for industrial design applications in 2023

Grouping the 32 Locarno classes into 12 industry sectors serves to highlight the most important industry sectors for designs contained within industrial design applications filed. In 2023, the sectors with the largest shares of the world total were textiles and accessories (17.3%), furniture and household goods (16.9%), tools and machines (11%), electricity and lighting (9.2%), and ICT and audiovisual (8.8%).

=== 2021 data ===
Statistical data released in 2022 show that the number of designs contained in international applications grew by 20.8% in 2021 to reach 22,480 designs – the fastest growth since 2010. For the fifth consecutive year, Samsung Electronics (Republic of Korea) headed the list of top filers.

=== 2020 data ===
Statistical data released in 2021 reveal that – with 5,792 international applications filed in 2020 – the Hague System showed some resilience in 2021 in the face of COVID-19; only 1.7% fewer applications compared to the previous year.

	2020	2019	Variation
Applications filed	5,792	5,886	-1.7%
Registrations recorded	6,795	5,042	+34.8%
Renewals of international registrations	4,759	3,550	+34.2%
Registrations in force	44,096	40,500	+6.3%

WIPO recorded 6,795 international registrations in 2020, representing a 34.8% increase on 2019.

In 2020, some 44,100 international registrations were in force, providing protection to approximately 172,200 designs.

=== 2019 data ===
The Hague Yearly Review released in 2020 indicated that the number of international applications filed in 2019 increased by 8% compared to 2018. The total number of applications filed still remains fairly low, at 5,886 – significantly lower than the UK IPO which received about 25,500 direct applications in 2019, according to official statistics.

== See also ==
- Hague Agreement Concerning the International Deposit of Industrial Designs
- Global Design Database
