= Term of patent =

Period that a patent is valid

The term of a patent is the maximum time during which it can be maintained in force. It is usually expressed in a number of years either starting from the filing date of the patent application or from the date of grant of the patent. In most patent laws, annuities or maintenance fees have to be regularly paid in order to keep the patent in force. Thus, a patent may lapse before its term if a renewal fee is not paid in due time.

== International harmonization ==
Significant international harmonization of patent term across national laws was provided in the 1990s by the implementation of the WTO's Agreement on Trade-Related Aspects of Intellectual Property Rights (TRIPs Agreement). Article 33 of the TRIPs Agreement provides that

"The term of protection available [for patents] shall not end before the expiration of a period of twenty years counted from the filing date."

Consequently, in most patent laws nowadays, the term of patent is 20 years from the filing date of the application. This however does not forbid the states party to the WTO from providing, in their national law, other type of patent-like rights with shorter terms. Utility models are an example of such rights. Their term is usually 6 or 10 years.

== Jurisdiction ==
=== Europe ===
The European Patent Convention requires all jurisdictions to give a European patent a term of 20 years from the actual date of filing an application for a European patent or the actual date of filing an international application under the PCT designating the EPO. The actual date of filing can be up to a year after the earliest priority date. The term of a granted European patent may be extended under national law if national law provides term extension to compensate for pre-marketing regulatory approval. For EEA member states this is by means of a supplementary protection certificate.

=== United States ===
In the United States, for utility patents filed on or after June 8, 1995, the term of the patent is 20 years from the earliest filing date of the application on which the patent was granted and any prior U.S. or Patent Cooperation Treaty (PCT) applications from which the patent claims priority (excluding provisional applications). For patents filed prior to June 8, 1995, the term of patent is either 20 years from the earliest filing date as above or 17 years from the issue date, whichever is longer. Extensions may be had for certain administrative delays.

The patent term will additionally be adjusted to compensate for delays in the issuance of a patent. The reasons for extensions include:

- Delayed response to an application request for patent.
- Exceeding 3 years to consider a patent application.
- Delays due to a secrecy order or appeal.

For design patents (patents based on decorative, non-functional features), for design applications filed on or after May 13, 2015, the term is 15 years from the issue date. For design applications filed before May 13, 2015, the term is 14 years from the issue date.

== See also ==
- Paris Convention for the Protection of Industrial Property, provides what is called the "priority year"
- Patent cliff, when the patent expiration leads to an abrupt drop in sales
- Provisional patent application
- Submarine patent
- Supplementary protection certificate (SPC), provides a limited time extension to the protection conferred by certain patents in the European Union
