= Industrial design right =

Intellectual property rights

An industrial design right is an intellectual property rights that grant exclusive protection to the visual appearance of products that are not purely utilitarian. An industrial design consists of the creation of a shape, configuration or composition of pattern or color, or combination of pattern and color in three-dimensional form containing aesthetic value. An industrial design can be a two- or three-dimensional pattern used to produce a product, industrial commodity or handicraft.

Registering for an industrial design right is related to granting a patent.

The Locarno Classification, an international classification system established by the Locarno Agreement (1968), provides a standardized framework for categorizing industrial designs according to their type and purpose. This system facilitates the registration and management of design rights across jurisdictions.

== Industrial design rights under The Hague System ==
Under the Hague Agreement Concerning the International Deposit of Industrial Designs, a WIPO-administered treaty, a procedure for an international registration exists. To qualify for registration, the national laws of most member states of WIPO require the design to be novel. An applicant can file for a single international deposit either with WIPO or through the national office in a country party to the treaty. The design will then be protected in as many member countries of the treaty as desired. Design rights started in the United Kingdom in 1787 with the Designing and Printing of Linen Act and have expanded from there.

In 2022, about 1.1 million industrial design applications were filed worldwide. This represents a decrease of 3% on 2021, marking a first drop in filings since 2014. In 2023, the number of applications rose again, with about 1.19 million design applications filed.

== Law making ==
=== India ===
India's Design Act, 2000 was enacted to consolidate and amend the law relating to protection of design and to comply with the articles 25 and 26 of Trade-Related Aspects of Intellectual Property Rights TRIPS agreement. The new act, (earlier Patent and Design Act, 1911 was repealed by this act) now defines "design" to mean only the features of shape, configuration, pattern, ornament, or composition of lines or colours applied to any article, whether in two- or three-dimensional, or in both forms, by any industrial process or means, whether manual or mechanical or chemical, separate or combined, which in the finished article appeal to and are judged solely by the eye; but does not include any mode or principle of construction.

=== Indonesia ===
In Indonesia the protection of the Right to Industrial Design shall be granted for 10 (ten) years commencing from the filing date and there is not any renewal or annuity after the given period.

- Industrial Designs that are Granted Protection

1. The Right to Industrial Design shall be granted for an Industrial Design that is novel/new
2. An Industrial Design shall be deemed new if on the filing date, such Industrial Design is not the same as any previous disclosure.
3. The previous disclosure as referred to in point 2 shall be one which before :
a. The filing date or
b. The Priority Date, if the applicant is filed with priority right.
c. Has been announced or used in Indonesia or outside Indonesia.

An industrial design shall not be deemed to have been announced if within the period of 6 (six) months at the latest before the filing date, such industrial design
a. Has been displayed in a national or international exhibition in Indonesia or overseas that is official or deemed to be official; or,
b. Has been used in Indonesia by the designer in an experiment for the purposes of education, research or development.

=== Canada ===
Canadian law affords ten years of protection to industrial designs that are registered; there is no protection for unregistered designs. The Industrial Design Act defines "design" or "industrial design" to mean "features of shape, configuration, pattern or ornament and any combination of those features that, in a finished article, appeal to and are judged solely by the eye." The design must also be original: in 2012, the Patent Appeal Board rejected a design for a trash can, and gave guidance as to what the Act requires:

- The degree of originality required to register an original design is greater than that laid down by Canadian copyright legislation, but less than that required to register a patent.
- The articles being compared should not be examined side by side, but separate so that imperfect recollection comes into play.
- One is to look at the design as a whole.
- Any change must be substantial. It must not be trivial or infinitesimal.

During the existence of an exclusive right, no person can "make, import for the purpose of trade or business, or sell, rent, or offer or expose for sale or rent, any article in respect of which the design is registered." The rule also applies to kits and substantial differences are in reference to previously published designs.

Registering an industrial design in Canada may be appropriate for a variety of articles such as consumer products, vehicles, sports equipment, packaging, etc., having an original aesthetic appearance, and may even be used to protect new technologies such as electronic icons. Industrial designs can also serve to complement other forms of intellectual property rights such as patents and trade-marks.

The Canadian courts see infrequent litigation concerning industrial designs — the first case in almost two decades took place in 2012 between Bodum and Trudeau Corporation concerning visual features of double wall drinking glasses.

It is possible for a registered design to also receive protection under Canadian copyright or trademark law:

- a "useful article" (ie, one with a utilitarian function) will receive copyright protection where it is reproduced in a quantity of fifty or less, but that limitation does not apply with respect to:
  - a graphic or photographic representation that is applied to the face of an article
  - a trade-mark or a representation thereof or a label
  - material that has a woven or knitted pattern or that is suitable for piece goods or surface coverings or for making wearing apparel
  - a representation of a real or fictitious being, event or place that is applied to an article as a feature of shape, configuration, pattern or ornament
- where a registered design has become publicly identifiable with the product, it may be eligible for registration as a "distinguishing guise" under trademark law, but such registration cannot be used to limit the development of any art or industry

=== European Union ===
Registered and unregistered European Union designs are available which provide a unitary right covering the European Union. Protection for a registered EU design is for up to 25 years, subject to the payment of renewal fees every five years. The unregistered EU design lasts for three years after a design is made available to the public and infringement only occurs if the protected design has been copied.

=== United Kingdom ===
Legislation given in Britain during the years 1787 to 1839 protected designs for textiles. The Copyright of Design Act passed in 1842 allowed other material designs, such as those for metal and earthenware objects, to be registered with a diamond mark to indicate the date of registration.

In addition to the design protection available under community designs, UK law provides its own national registered design right (Registered Designs Act 1949, later amended by Copyright, Designs and Patents Act 1988) and an unregistered design right. The unregistered right, which exists automatically if the requirements are met, can last for up to 15 years. The registered design right can last up to 25 years subject to the payment of maintenance fees. The topography of semi-conductor circuits are also covered by integrated circuit layout design protection, a form of protection which lasts 10 years.

=== Japan ===
Article 1 of the Japanese Design Law states: "This law was designed to protect and utilize designs and to encourage creation of designs in order to contribute to industrial development". The protection period in Japan is 20 years from the day of registration.

=== United States ===
U.S. design patents last fifteen years from the date of grant if filed on or after May 13, 2015 (fourteen years if filed before May 13, 2015) and cover the ornamental aspects of utilitarian objects. Objects that lack a use beyond that conferred by their appearance or the information they convey may be covered by copyright—a form of intellectual property of much longer duration that exists as soon as a qualifying work is created. In some circumstances, rights may also be acquired in trade dress, but trade dress protection is akin to trademark rights and requires that the design have source significance or "secondary meaning". It is useful only to prevent source misrepresentations; trade dress protection.

=== Australia ===
In Australia, design patent registration lasts for 5 years, with an option to be extended once for an additional 5 years. For the patent to be granted, a formalities exam is needed. If infringement action is to be taken, the design needs to become certified which involves a substantive examination. This process ensures that the design is truly unique and eligible for protection under Australian patent law.

== Duration of design rights ==
Depending on the jurisdiction, registered design rights have a duration between 15 and 50 years.

Members of the WIPO Hague system have to publish their maximum term of protection for design rights. These terms are presented in the table below. Some of the jurisdictions below are unions or collaborative office for design registration like the African Intellectual Property Organization, the European Union and the Benelux.

Country or union	Maximum duration of design right
African Intellectual Property Organization	15 years
Albania	15 years
Armenia	15 years
Azerbaijan	15 years
Belize	15 years
Benelux	25 years
Benin	15 years
Bosnia and Herzegovina	25 years
Botswana	15 years
Brunei Darussalam	15 years
Bulgaria	25 years
Cambodia	15 years
Côte d'Ivoire	15 years
Croatia	25 years
Denmark	25 years (except: spare parts, 15 years)
Democratic People's Republic of Korea	15 years
Egypt	15 years
Estonia	25 years
European Union	25 years
Finland	25 years (except: spare parts, 15 years)
France	25 years
Gabon	15 years
Georgia	25 years
Germany	25 years
Ghana	15 years
Greece	25 years
Hungary	25 years
Iceland	25 years
Italy	25 years
Japan	20 years
Kyrgyzstan	15 years
Latvia	25 years
Liechtenstein	25 years
Lithuania	25 years
Mali	15 years
Monaco	50 years
Mongolia	15 years
Montenegro	25 years
Morocco	50 years
Namibia	15 years
Nepal	25 years
Niger	15 years
Norway	25 years
Oman	15 years
Poland	25 years
Republic of Korea	20 years
Republic of Moldova	25 years
Romania	25 years
Russian Federation	25 years
São Tomé and Príncipe	15 years
Senegal	15 years
Serbia	25 years
Singapore	15 years
Slovenia	25 years
Spain	25 years
Sweden	25 years (except: spare parts, 15 years)
Switzerland	25 years
Syrian Arab Republic	15 years
Tajikistan	15 years
Sri Lanka	15 years
The former Yugoslav Republic of Macedonia	25 years
Tunisia	15 years
Turkey	25 years
Ukraine	15 years
United Kingdom	25 years
United States of America	15 years

== Industrial design applications ==
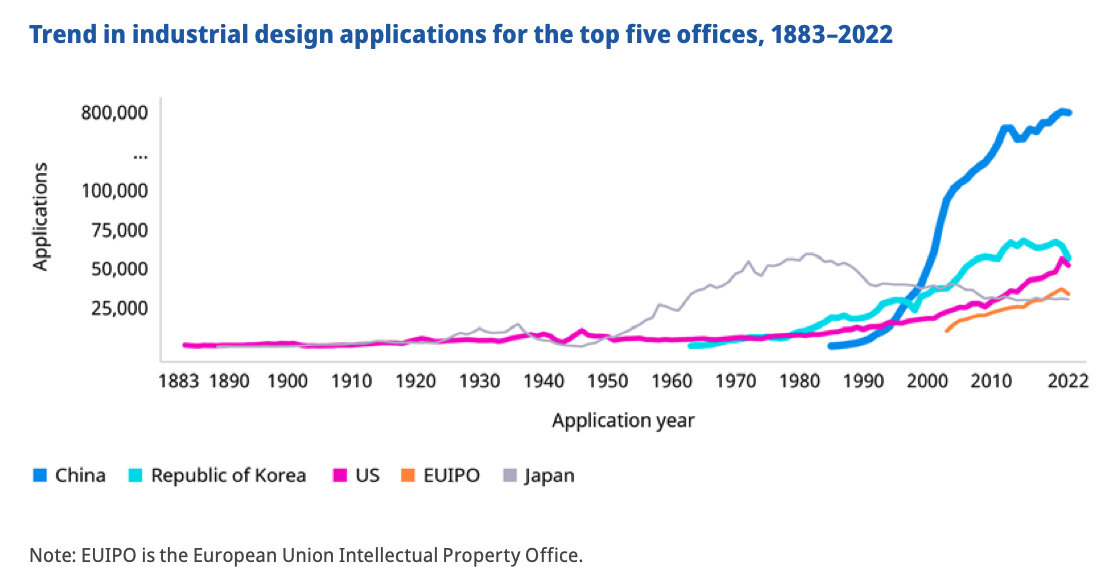
Trend in industrial design applications for the top five application offices, 1883–2022

AApplication design counts by region, in 2015 and in 2025. WIPI 2026.

Between 1883 and the early 1950s, the offices of Japan and the United States of America averaged a similar number of industrial design applications, rarely exceeding 10,000. The office of Japan received the highest number of applications per year from the 1950s thru to the late 1990s, reaching approximately 50,000 annual filings at its peak. The office of China, which received 640 applications when it first began receiving applications in 1985, has seen an unprecedented rate of growth, peaking at 805,710 applications filed in 2021. The office of the Republic of Korea surpassed the office of Japan in 2004 and has remained in second position ever since. In 2012, the office of the US moved ahead of Japan to become the third largest globally. The EUIPO began receiving applications in 2003 and moved up to fourth position in 2019. Among these top five offices, the EUIPO is the only one to have a multiple design system. Applications filed at the European Union IP Office contained 109,132 designs in 2022.

In 2025, the World Intellectual Property Organization (WIPO) received 10,344 international applications for design protection under the Hague system for the International Registration of Industrial Design, a 9.4% increase over the 2024. Applications contained a record 28,588 designs, representing a 5.2% growth and marking the System’s fifth consecutive year of expansion .The strong 5.2% growth rate in 2025 is largely attributable to China and the United States. In 2025, international applications grew by 9.4% to reach 10,344 applications.

=== Hague top applicants ===
The Hague System for the International Registration of Industrial Designs provides an international mechanism that secures protection of up to 100 designs in multiple countries or regions, through a single international application. International design applications are filed directly through WIPO using the WIPO Hague System. The domestic legal framework of each designated contracting party governs the design protection provided by the resulting international registrations. The Hague System does not require the applicant to file a national or regional design application.

Hague top applicants in 2025
Ranking	Applicant's name	Origin	2023	2024	2025
1	Huawei Technologies Co. Ltd.	China	44	431	1,200
2	Beijing Xiaomi Mobile Software Co. Ltd.	China	315	230	659
3	Procter & Gamble Co.	US	525	641	613
4	Koninklijke Philips Electronics N.V.	Netherlands	294	228	540
5	Samsung Electronics Co. Ltd.	South Korea	544	426	525
6	Apple Inc.	US	7	85	408
7	LG Electronics	South Korea	352	459	347
8	Ferrari S.P.A.	Italy	172	442	266
9	Kronoplus Limited	Malta	172	93	246
10	Volkswagen AG	Germany	312	285	229

== Bibliography ==
- Brian W. Gray & Effie Bouzalas, editors, Industrial Design Rights: An International Perspective (Kluwer Law International: The Hague, 2001) ISBN 90-411-9684-6

== See also ==
- Design patent (US patent law)
- Geschmacksmuster (German design law)
- Industrial design rights in the European Union
- Open-design movement
- Utility model
- Design Law Treaty
- Hague Agreement Concerning the International Deposit of Industrial Designs
