= South African patent system =

Regulates patents of inventions

The South African patent system is the system by which patents are granted in South Africa.

As is the case in many other countries, a patent provides legal protection for a new and industrially applicable invention. This invention, which constitutes either a product or process, has to be brought about as a result of an inventive step. Essentially, this new product or process has to represent a new way of doing things or has to provide a technical solution to a real-life industrial problem. An invention is only considered to be new and based on an inventive step if the same idea has not been expressed in writing, orally or practically, or in any other way, anywhere immediately prior to the priority date of the invention.

== South African Patent Act and CIPC ==
In terms of the South African Patent Act 57 of 1978, the Companies and Intellectual Property Commission (CIPC) is the custodian of all new patent applications that are filed within the Republic of South Africa. An individual can privately file a provisional patent application. However, only a patent attorney can file a non-provisional patent application and assist in drafting the patent specification; see Patent attorney: South Africa. It is essential that the content of the patent specification - referring to the definition and description of the invention - is clear, coherent, and concise so that the patent is assured the maximum protection. Protection is granted for twenty years from the filing date of the non-provisional patent application.

== Provisional and complete specification ==
If a South African inventor applies for a patent, the application is accompanied by a provisional or complete specification. A provisional specification is lodged at CIPC if the inventor is still testing or developing the product or process. The provisional specification affords temporary protection for 12 months, extendible locally for three months, and forms the basis for a complete patent application and foreign patent applications. Once the invention has been fully developed and tested, a fresh patent application, with complete specification, is filed. If the product or process has already been technically finalized from the start, only a complete specification is lodged.

== Patent search ==
The responsibility for ensuring that the application is valid resides with the applicant. South Africa is a non-examining country. This means that CIPC does not investigate the novelty or inventive merit of the invention - only the form of documentation is verified and not the substance of the product or process. For peace of mind, the inventor can make use of the services of a qualified patent attorney to investigate the existence of previous patent specifications that relate to the relevant invention. This procedure, although expensive, may negate possible future litigation procedures and unnecessary financial expenses. It is crucial that an international patent search should be conducted, especially if an inventor wants to commercialize a product or process in foreign countries. The same applies to a patentee, who wants to commercialize an invention and who does not want to infringe someone else’s patent. A search should then be conducted at the South African Patent Office. An online search system is currently available at http://patentsearch.cipc.co.za, though the range of searchable fields is somewhat limited compared to other national patent search systems, and, as of the present writing (26 July 2013), the document retrieval system only returns empty documents. Searches can also be carried out by hand at the Patent Office through a card-based system; however, electronic patent searches may be performed on a contract basis on proprietary systems such as the Electronic Patent Journal (EPJ).

== Patentable invention ==
Section 25 of the South African Patent Act, Act 57 of 1978, specifies that a patentable invention includes new inventions in the fields of trade and industry or agriculture. However, this act excludes new discoveries; new scientific theories; new mathematical methods; new schemes, rules or methods for performing mental acts, playing games or doing business; new computer programs; and presentation of information. Even if an inventor’s product or process falls within the scope of the excluded categories, patent attorneys may be able to draft the patent specification in such a manner that the invention gets legal protection.

== Patent Cooperation Treaty ==
South Africa is a signatory of the Patent Cooperation Treaty (PCT). This means that South Africans are able to file both national and international applications. This is in line with the supranational recognition of intellectual property restrictions within the context of globalisation.

== Regional cooperation ==
South Africa is not a member of the African Regional Intellectual Property Organization (ARIPO) or the Organisation Africaine de la Propriété Intellectuelle (OAPI). It participates in the SANi patent system, a cooperative effort between South Africa and Nigeria that provides for patent coverage in both of those countries.

== International inventive step requirements ==
South African criteria for the originality of an invention are analogous to those of most of the First World, e.g. Europe, the United States, Japan, and Australia. However, South Africa's inventive step requirements differ from some of these countries. Consequently, the International Search Report and the International Preliminary Examination Report should be consulted when examining a South African application. This will indicate whether the PCT International Specification as filed and as published should be amended when filing a South African application. Importantly, such a step lessens the possibility that a South African patent, which may be granted on the application, will be deemed invalid on the grounds of lack of inventive step.

== See also ==
- African Regional Intellectual Property Organization
