= Liskom =

Russian manufacturing company

Liskom, Ltd.
- Type: Private
- Industry: Vending Machines
- Founded: 2004
- Headquarters: Moscow, Russia
- Products: Vending photocopiers, vending machines
- Number of employees: 50 (2009)
- Website: http://www.liskom.ru

Liskom, Ltd. is a vending machine manufacturing company based in Moscow, Russia. The mainstream product of the company is coin- and bill-operated photocopier "Kopirkin".

Liskom was the first company in Russia to manufacture the vending photocopier what is confirmed by utility model patent (RU70010 (U1)) hold by company.

Liskom is one of the largest and well-known companies on Russian vending machines manufacturing market.

== General information ==
Liskom's area of expertise is development and manufacturing of vending machines and related electronics (such as watchdog timers for interactive kiosks and ATMs).

PCBs for machines developed are produced and programmed inhouse.

Liskom headquarters are located in Moscow, development center is located in Samara.

Primary market for Liskom is Russian Federation and CIS countries, but some of the products are also exported to Europe.

Representatives and dealers of the company are located in Ukraine, Kazakhstan and in several cities across Russia.

== History ==
The company was founded in 2004 and initially manufactured interactive kiosks and slot machines.

In 2007 Liskom has started manufacturing vending machines by introducing vending photocopier Kopirkin. Two new models of Kopirkin were developed later in 2008 and 2009. "Kopirkin Print" - extended version of "Kopirkin" with built-in memory and keypad for printing predefined documents and "Kopiring Profy" - touch-screen based printing-scanning-copying machine for educational facilities.

== Products ==
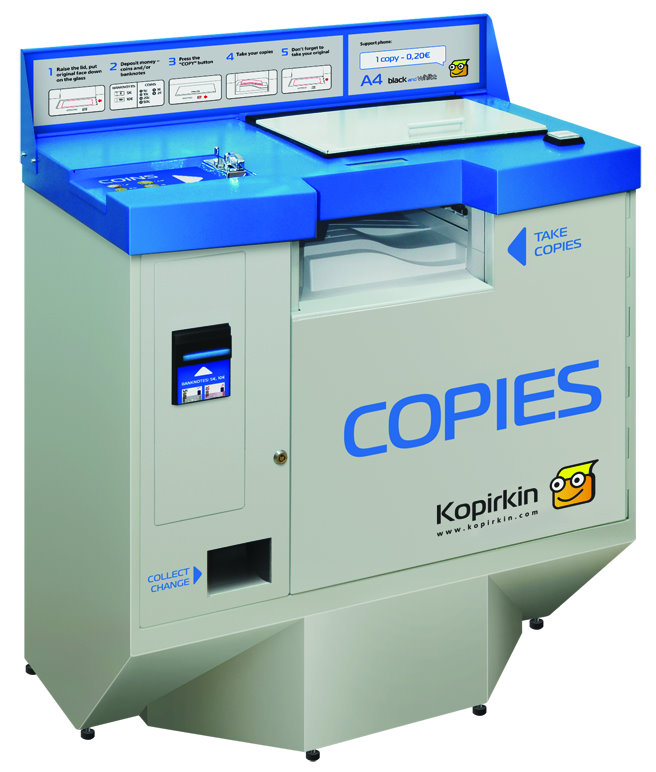
The vending photocopier Kopirkin

The main Liskom's product is vending photocopier "Kopirkin" based on Xerox's photocopier.

Kopirkin is a ruggedized, banknote- and coin-operated self-service photocopier (A4, black-and-white).

It is as independent and autonomous as traditional vending machines. "Kopirkin" is meant to be placed in public places and is made in a metal anti-vandal cabinet manufactured by “TechnoProm Group” LLC.

One of distinctive "Kopirkin" features is GSM/GPRS remote monitoring (telemetry) system.

== Notes ==
Www.liskom.ru
