= Kind code =

WIPO standard

In patent law, a kind code, or WIPO Standard ST.16 code, is a code used on patent documents published by intellectual property offices to distinguish different kinds of patent documents. A kind code includes a letter, and in many cases a number, used to distinguish the kind of patent document (e.g., publication of an application for a utility patent (patent application publication), patent, plant patent application publication, plant patent, or design patent) and the level of publication (e.g., first publication, second publication, or corrected publication). The recommended use is the two-letter country code followed by the patent document number and then the kind code, e.g., "US 7,654,321 B1" for U.S. Patent No. 7,654,321 where there was no previously published patent application publication, and "US 2003/1234567 A1" for U.S. Patent Application Publication No. 2003/1234567, published in 2003.

== In the European Patent Office ==
The European Patent Office (EPO) uses kind codes such as the following. Kind codes for patent applications begin with A and include

- A1, for an application published with a European search report;
- A2, for an application published without a European search report; and
- A3, for a later publication of the European search report.

Kind codes for granted patents begin with B and chiefly include B1 for a European patent specification (granted patent).

== In Japan ==
The Japan Patent Office (JPO) uses kind codes including

- A for publications of patent applications; and
- B1 and B2 for publications of granted patents.

== In the United States ==
In the United States, effective January 2, 2001, the kind codes indicate a variety of documents published by the United States Patent and Trademark Office (USPTO), most importantly patent application publications and patents. The kind codes include

- A1, for a patent application publication (pre-grant publication);
- B1, for a patent issuing from an application that was not previously published as a pre-grant publication; and
- B2, for a patent issuing from an application that was previously published as a pre-grant publication.

Before January 2, 2001, the kind code for issued patents was A.

== PCT documents ==
For publication of international patent applications filed under the Patent Cooperation Treaty, the kind codes include

- A1 for an application published with an international search report (ISR);
- A2 for an application published without an ISR; and
- A3 for later publication of the ISR.
