= Maintenance fee (patent) =

Fee required to maintain a patent in force

Maintenance fees or renewal fees are fees paid to maintain a granted patent in force. Some patent laws require the payment of maintenance fees for pending patent applications. Not all patent laws require the payment of maintenance fees and different laws provide different regulations concerning not only the amount payable but also the regularity of the payments. In countries where maintenance fees are to be paid annually, they are sometimes called patent annuities.

== Rationale ==
Research is indicating that renewal fees can be used to improve the innovation incentives generated by patent rights.

== International treaties ==
=== Paris Convention ===
Article 5bis of the Paris Convention requires that parties to the convention should provide a six-month grace period for paying maintenance fees:

(1) A period of grace of not less than six months shall be allowed for the payment of the fees prescribed for the maintenance of industrial property rights, subject, if the domestic legislation so provides, to the payment of a surcharge.
(2) The countries of the Union shall have the right to provide for the restoration of patents which have lapsed by reason of non–payment of fees.

=== Patent Cooperation Treaty ===
International patent applications filed under the Patent Cooperation Treaty are not subject to the payment of maintenance fees. However, maintenance fees may fall due to designated/elected national and regional offices. If renewal fees have become due by the time the national phase starts, they must be paid before the expiration of the time limit applicable for entering the national phase.

== National and regional legislations ==
=== Canada ===
In Canada, maintenance fees for a patent application, or a patent issued from the application, are due on each anniversary of the filing date of the application, beginning on the second anniversary. The amount due increases each year during the life of the patent or patent application.

If the maintenance fee is not paid (by the applicant or agent of record) by the due date with respect to a patent application, the application is deemed abandoned. The abandoned application may be reinstated within 12 months of the date of abandonment, by filing a request for reinstatement with payment of the maintenance fee that is due and the reinstatement fee.

The maintenance fee for a patent may be paid within a one-year grace period after the due date, with the payment of a late fee. If the required fee has not been paid when the grace period expires, the patent lapses.

=== China ===
No annuity (maintenance) fees need to be paid while applications are pending. Once granted of the patent maintenance fees are due based on the anniversary of application date. The unpaid fees while the patent was pending have to be paid on grant.

=== European Patent Office ===
Renewal fees are payable to the European Patent Office in respect of pending European patent applications in respect of the third year from the date of filing. These fees are paid in advance of the year in which they are due (such that the renewal fee for the third year falls due two years from the date of filing) and fall due on the last day of the month containing the anniversary of the date of filing. Renewal fees may not be validly paid more than three months before they fall due, except for the third renewal fee which can be paid up to six months before its due date (in accordance with amended Rule 51(1) EPC in force since April 2018).

If the payment of a renewal fee for a European patent application is not made in due time, the renewal fee may still be validly paid within 6 months of the due date, provided that the additional fee provided by Rule 51(2) EPC is paid within the 6 months as well. For the calculation of the 6-month additional period, the so-called de ultimo ad ultimo rule is applied by the EPO. According to this rule, the six-month period runs "from the last day of the month to the last day of the month". For instance, if a renewal fee was due in February 2004, the additional fee fell due on August 31, 2004 (Tuesday), i.e. 6 months from the end of February 2004.

The obligation to pay renewal fees terminates with the payment of the renewal fee due in respect of the year in which the mention of the grant of the European patent is published. Subsequently, renewal fees are payable to the national offices of the EPC Contracting States in which the European patent is brought into effect. Each Contracting State then pays the European Patent Organisation a proportion of each renewal fee received for a European patent in that State.

=== Italy ===
In a widely criticised move the Italian Parliament approved the cancellation of all maintenance fees due for Italian patents (including European patents validated in Italy), utility models and designs, as from January 1, 2006. Although the fees were reintroduced on January 2, 2007, the actual amounts of the fees were not announced until April 6, 2007. Consequently, for any fees that fell due between January 2, 2007, and April 30, 2007, the time limit for paying these was extended to June 30, 2007. Some, including Roland Grossenbacher, then chairman of the Administrative Council of the European Patent Organisation, considered that the abolishment of annuity fees in Italy was an error, because, if annuities were abolished, "all patents would remain in force up to the 20th year."

=== Russian Federation ===
Patent maintenance fees are due in Russia every year starting with the third year after the application date. The maintenance fee increases from 1,700 roubles (22.43 US$) on the third year to 16,200 roubles ($213.73) on the twentieth year. Maintenance fees constitute a fraction of the costs with up to 5-fold discounts available for individual inventors, small and non-profit businesses, and those who are willing to license their patents under nominal cost and non-discriminatory terms.

However, since June 23, 2022, most foreign patent owners are able to make patent maintenance payments in Russia, and their patents are still in force despite US sanctions. This is because Rospatent requires all payments to be processed via Central Bank of Russia, and this bank has been a subject of sanctions exceptions imposed by the United States and its allies.

=== United Kingdom ===
The United Kingdom does not require renewal fees to be paid in respect of pending applications but a granted patent must be renewed on the 4th anniversary of the filing date and every year after that.

Historically, and in contrast to most other European countries and the European Patent Office, the law in the United Kingdom required that renewal fees be paid on the anniversary of the filing date rather than on the last day of the month. Following amendments made by the Patents Act 2004, The Patents (Amendment) Rules 2005, which came into effect on 1 October 2005, ensured that any period prescribed for payment of a renewal fee does not expire until the end of the month in which the renewal date falls.

=== United States ===
For all issued utility patents stemming from applications filed on or after December 12, 1980, the USPTO requires three renewal payments at 3½, 7½ and 11½ years after the date of grant (the payments can be made no sooner than 6 month prior to the due date). No maintenance fees are due while an application is pending.

Several adjustments have been approved by the Congress since:

- 1980: Public Law 96-517 – Establishes patent renewal (maintenance fees) due at three time periods (stages).
- 1982: Public Law 97-247 – Establishes the patent small entity discount for all fees set by Congress and the Trademark "fence" (Trademark user fees may be used only on trademark related operations).
- 1990: Public Law 101-508 – A 69% surcharge is applied to all patent statutory fees. The agency becomes fully-fee funded.
- 1991: Public Law 102-204 – Establishes yearly adjustments to patent statutory fees based on annual increases to consumer price index.
- 2005: Public Law 108-447 – Establishes the current USPTO fee structure, including separate patent filing, search and examination fees and discounts for trademark applicants who file electronically and agree to other terms.
- 2011: Public Law 112-29 (America Invents Act) – Establishes USPTO's authority to set most patent and trademark fees such that aggregate revenue from the fee schedule recovers aggregate costs. Establishes additional small entity fees and new micro entity fees.

Design patents and plant patents are not subject to maintenance fees at all.

Maintenance fees may not be paid in advance; the patentee must wait until the payment window opens six months before the due date before paying a maintenance fee. At the end of the half-year window during which a maintenance fee may be paid, a six-month grace period begins during which a patentee may still pay the maintenance fee along with a small surcharge (as of 2016: $160 for a large entity, $80 for a small entity; and $40 for a micro entity) in order to maintain the patent. If the maintenance fee has not been paid at the conclusion of the grace period, the patent expires for non-payment of maintenance fees. However, the patent can be revived, by a petition indicating that the non-payment was unintentional.

The data released by the USPTO in 2023 shows that the rate of patent maintenance remained fairly constant over the last 20 years: first patent maintenance fees were paid for 86% of issued patents, the second - for 67%, and the third - for 44%.
