= Trudeau Corporation =

Kitchenware company

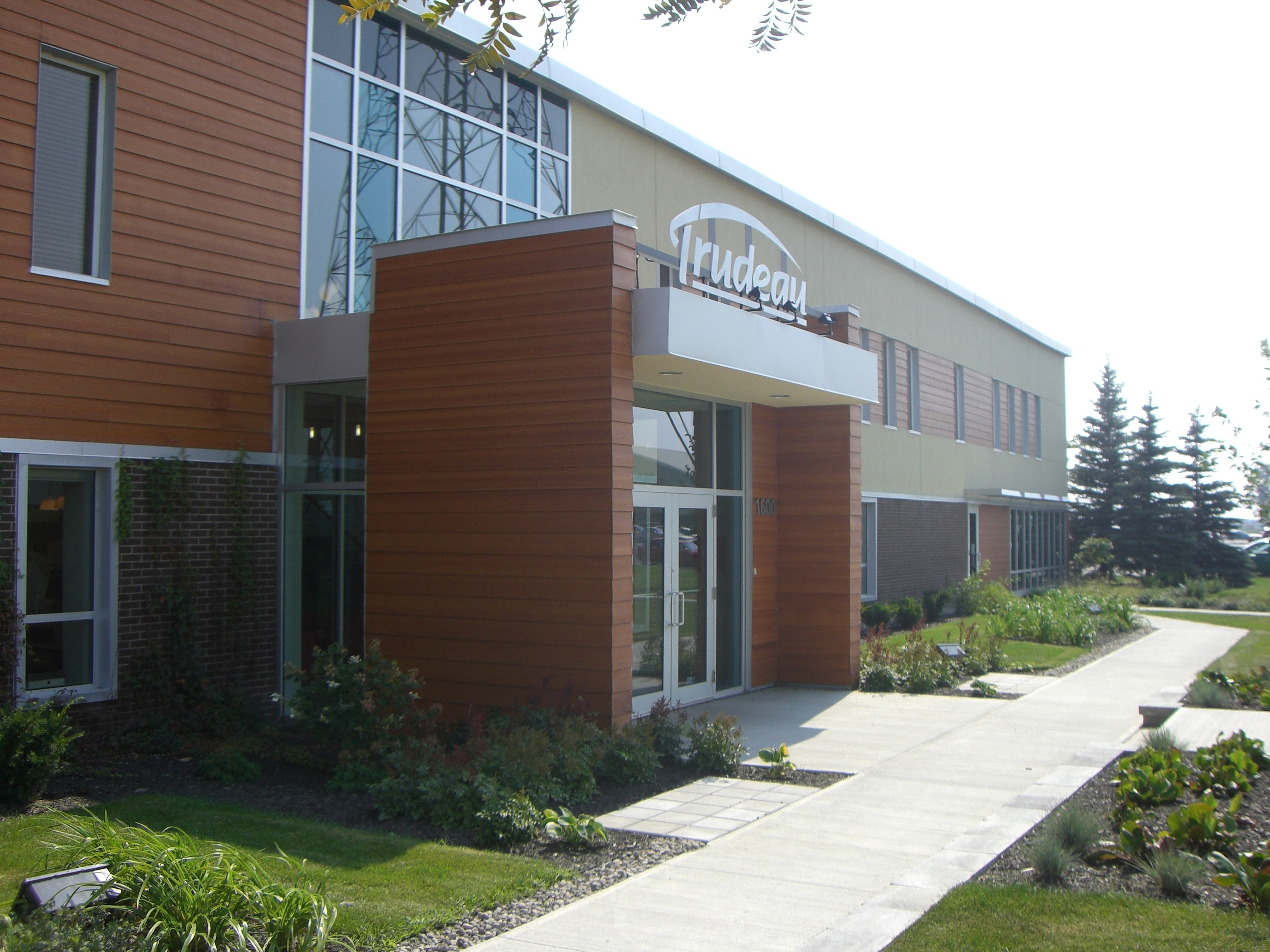
- Trudeau Corporation, Boucherville, Québec
- Formerly: The General Bazaar Company
- Founded: 1889; 137 years ago in Montreal, Quebec
- Website: trudeau.com

Trudeau Corporation is a Canadian company specialized in the design, manufacturing, and distribution of houseware, kitchenware and products for children under license. The Canadian distribution centre is located in Longueuil, Quebec near Montreal; the American distribution centre located in Bolingbrook, Illinois (near Chicago)

== History ==
The company was founded as The General Bazaar Company in 1889 in Montreal, Quebec, Canada as a manufacturer of kitchenware and tableware. The company initially focused on the distribution of imported articles, including smoker's accessories and religious articles. In 1919, Joseph-Arthur Trudeau became president.

Trudeau developed an extensive distribution network, emphasizing brand name small electrical accessories. It imported a range of decorative giftware made of crystal from France and Czechoslovakia.

Later, it added new exclusive ranges of housewares, giftware and porcelain figurine collectibles. Trudeau started to export its products internationally and experienced significant growth in many countries, especially for its range of children's tableware.

Trudeau launched the "Trudeau" and "Home Presence" Brands and created two organizations: Home Presence and Trudeau Corporation 1889 Inc. In 2021, Anne-Marie Trudeau, from the fourth generation of the Trudeau family, became the first woman owner of the company, after four years of already being President and CEO.
