= Hague Agreement Concerning the International Deposit of Industrial Designs =

1925 multilateral treaty

- Hague Union State, Party to 1960 Hague Act Hague Union State, Parties to 1999 Geneva Act covered by Regional Economic Integration Organization (REIO), not separate member Hague Union State, also covered by REIO
- Signed: 6 November 1925 (The Hague Agreement); 2 June 1934 (London act); 14 July 1967 (The Hague Act/Stockholm addnl Act); 2 July 1999 (Geneva Act)
- Location: The Hague
- Effective: 1 June 1928 (Agreement), 23 December, 2003 (Geneva Act)
- Parties: 85
- Depositary: Switzerland (1925/1934); Netherlands (1960); WIPO (1999)

The Hague Agreement Concerning the International Deposit of Industrial Designs, also known as the Hague system, provides a mechanism for registering an industrial design in several countries by means of a single application, filed in one language, with one set of fees. The system is administered by WIPO.

== Instruments ==
The Hague Agreement consists of several separate treaties, the most important of which are: the Hague Agreement of 1925, the London Act of 2 June 1934, the Hague Act of 28 November 1960 (amended by the Stockholm Act), and the Geneva Act of 2 July 1999.

The original version of the Agreement (the 1925 Hague version) is no longer applied, since all states parties signed up to subsequent instruments. The 1934 London Act formally applied between a London Act member that did not sign up to the Hague and/or Geneva Act in relation with other London act states until October 2016. Since 1 January 2010, however, the application of this act has already been frozen. The application of the 1960 Hague Act has also then been frozen on 31 December 2024.

Countries can become a party to the 1999 (Geneva) Act. The applicants from that country can only use the Hague system to obtain protection for their designs in other countries which are signed up to the same Act. For instance, because the European Union has only signed up to the 1999 (Geneva) Act, applicants which qualify to use the Hague system because their domicile is in the European Union can only get protection in countries which have also signed up to the 1999 Act.

== Naming ==
The agreement was concluded at the Dutch city The Hague.

Its full name was the "Hague Agreement Concerning the International Deposit of Industrial Designs".

It was renamed in the 1999 Geneva Act, in Article 1, the Hague Agreement Concerning the International Registration of Industrial Designs.

== History ==
The origins of the Hague System date back to 1925. The Hague Agreement was revised in 1934 (London Act) and again in 1960 (Hague Act). An Additional Act signed in Monaco in 1961, and a Complementary Act signed in Stockholm in 1967 (further amended in 1979) came to supplement what is generally referred to as The Hague Agreement. The latest revision is the Geneva Act (1999), which modernized the system and, as of 1 January 2025, is the sole Act under which new international design applications can be filed.

The WIPO-administered Hague System for the International Registration of Industrial Designs once comprised three international treaties: the London Act (1934), which replaced the Hague Agreement of 1925, the Hague Act (1960) and the Geneva Act (1999).

The 1934 London Act introduced simplified procedures for the international registration of industrial designs, with a uniform duration of protection of 15 years divided into two periods: the first one of five years, and a second of 10 years, It also established fundamental requirements for application filings. The London Act was meant to encourage more States to accede to the Arrangement. The application of the London Act was frozen with effect from 1 January 2010, and the last designations governed by this Act expired on 30 December 2024. Renewals or modifications of existing registrations under this Act remain possible up to the maximum duration of protection.

The 1960 Hague Act further improved the Hague System by enabling applicants to file in English in addition to French for registration and by providing for the publication of the reproductions of designs. The changes were meant to encourage more participation as the Agreement had limited success and few members. The modifications to the Hague Act 1960 were sufficiently radical that it was qualified as being ‘in fact a wholly new Treaty’. Concluded in 1968, the Locarno Agreement established an international classification for industrial designs. The application of the 1960 Hague Act was frozen from 1 January 2025. From that date, it is no longer possible to file new applications or make designations under this Act, while existing registrations or designations remain valid and can still be renewed or modified. With effect from 1 January 2025, the Common Regulations Under the 1999 Act and the 1960 Act of the Hague Agreement ("Common Regulations") became the "Regulations Under the Geneva Act (1999) of the Hague Agreement Concerning the International Registration of Industrial Designs."

The most recent Act of the Hague Agreement is the Geneva Act (1999) – signed on 2 July 1999 – and entered into effect on 23 December 2003. The 1999 Geneva Act was intended to permit a significant expansion of The Hague System, allowing intergovernmental organizations such as the European Union (EU) and the African Intellectual Property Organization (OAPI) to become members. The Act introduced more flexibilities, for example to be better adapted to the needs of countries with substantive examination systems, especially those adhering to the common law system. It also introduced the option for an applicant to defer the publication of a registration for up to 30 months, thus affording businesses additional time for strategic decision-making. Furthermore, it simplified the renewal process (e.g., streamlining administrative tasks) and extended the minimum duration of protection from 10 to 15 years. The number of parties adhering to the Hague Agreement has seen considerable growth since the 1999 Geneva Act, reaching 85 Contracting Parties, covering 114 countries in 2026. It has been reported that the actual use of the system in terms of filing is not impressive, though growing.

=== Membership ===
The Hague System – signed in 1925 and entered into force in 1928 – initially comprised four members: Germany, the Kingdom of the Netherlands, Spain and Switzerland. Belgium soon followed in 1929, with France, Morocco and Tunisia joining in 1930. Membership grew between 1928 and 1980, increasing from the initial four to 13 members. The mid-1990s marked the beginning of a period of rapid growth, both in terms of the absolute number of members, as well as geographical distribution. Initially dominated by European nations alongside three African countries, The Hague System gained its first member from the Latin American and Caribbean (LAC) region when Suriname acceded in 1975, followed by the North Korea becoming the first Asian member in 1992.

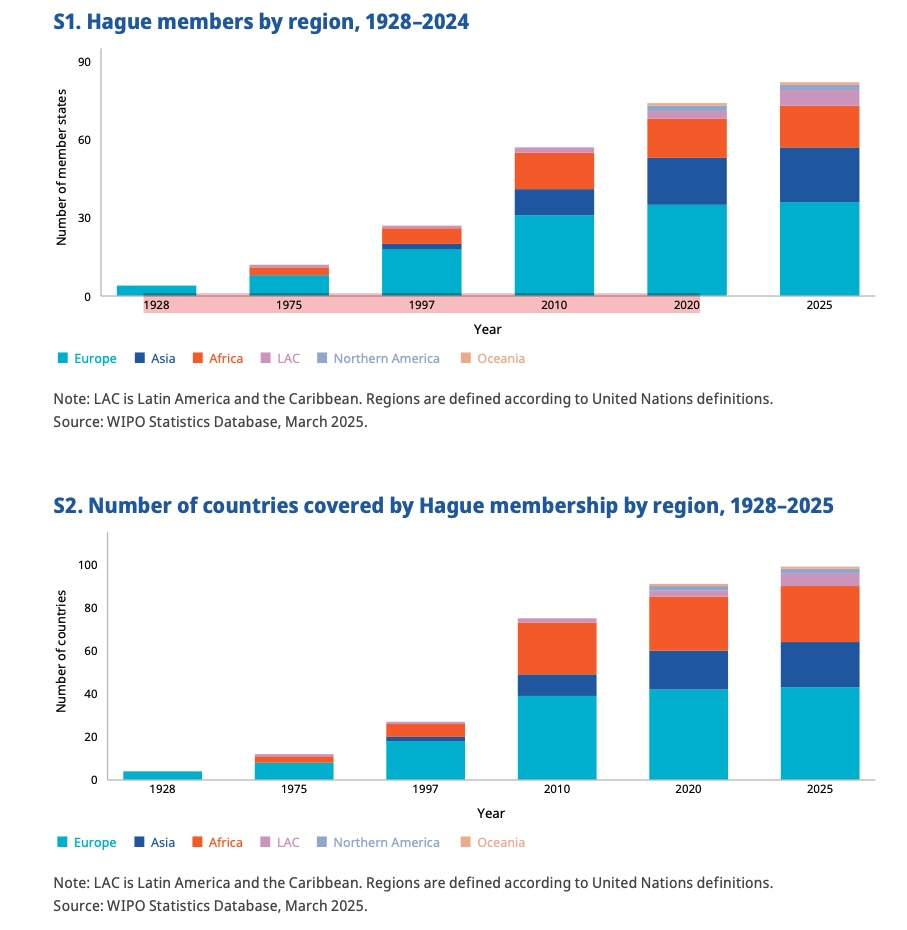
Members of The Hague Agreement from 1928 till 2024

The accession of OAPI and the EU, extending potential design protection across the then 17 OAPI and 28 EU member states (27 following Brexit in 2020); and second, in 2014 and 2015, with the addition of Japan, the Republic of Korea and the US, collectively representing approximately one-third of all foreign-filed design applications in 2015 significantly changed the membership. China, the country leading in industrial design activity in 2024, joined the Hague System in 2022.

As of July 2026, the Hague System include 85 members. In 2025, the distribution of members by region was as follows:

- Europe (43.9%),
- Asia (25.6%),
- Africa (19.5%),
- LAC (7.3%),
- Northern America (2.4%) and
- Oceania (1.2%)

== Contracting Parties (member countries) ==
As of July 14, 2026, the Hague System has 85 members that covers 82 individual states, the European Union, the African Intellectual Property Organization and the Eurasian Patent Organization.

All contracting parties to one or more of the instruments of the Hague Agreement are members of the Hague Union. A list is shown below:

| Code (Note: Code used in the context of the Hague Agreement) | Member | The Hague 1925 (entry into force) | London 1934 (Note: Application was suspended since 2013) (entry into force) | The Hague 1960 (entry into force) | Stockholm 1967 (entry into force) | Geneva 1999 (entry into force) | territorial scope |
|---|---|---|---|---|---|---|---|
| OA | OAPI | | | | | 16 September 2008 | |
| AL | Albania | | | 19 March 2007 | 19 March 2007 | 19 March 2007 | |
| AM | Armenia | | | | | 13 July 2007 | Territory also covered by EA |
| AZ | Azerbaijan | | | | | 8 December 2010 | Territory also covered by EA |
| BY | Belarus | | | | | 19 July 2021 | Territory also covered by EA |
| BX | Belgium | 27 July 1929- 1 January 1975 | 24 November 1939- 1 January 1975 | 1 August 1984 (Note: The Benelux countries form a single territory for application of this act) | 28 May 1997 | 18 December 2018 | Territory also covered by EM |
| BZ | Belize | | | 12 July 2003 | 12 July 2003 | 9 February 2019 | |
| BJ | Benin | | 2 November 1986- 18 October 2016 | 2 November 1986 | 2 January 1987 | | Territory also covered by OA |
| BA | Bosnia and Herzegovina | | | | | 24 December 2008 | |
| BW | Botswana | | | | | 5 December 2006 | |
| BR | Brazil | | | | | 1 August 2023 | |
| BN | Brunei Darussalam | | | | | 24 December 2013 | |
| BG | Bulgaria | | | 11 December 1996 | 11 December 1996 | 7 October 2008 | |
| KH | Cambodia | | | | | 25 February 2017 | |
| CA | Canada | | | | | 5 November 2018 | |
| CN | China | | | | | 5 May 2022 | excluding Hong Kong and Macao |
| CI | Cote d'Ivoire | | 30 May 1993- 18 October 2016 | 30 May 1993 | 30 May 1993 | | Territory also covered by OA |
| HR | Croatia | | | 12 February 2004 | 12 February 2004 | 12 April 2004 | Territory also covered by EM |
| DK | Denmark | | | | | 9 December 2008 | Territory also covered by EM incl.Greenland (2011); Faroe Islands (2016) |
| -- | East Germany | | 1949- 3 October 1990 | 7 May 1989- 3 October 1990 | 7 May 1989- 3 October 1990 | | |
| EG | Egypt | | 1 July 1952- 18 October 2016 | | | 27 August 2004 | |
| SV | El Salvador | | | | | 7 October 2026 | |
| EE | Estonia | | | | | 23 December 2003 | Territory also covered by EM |
| EA | EAPO | | | | | 10 October 2026 | |
| EM | European Union | | | | | 1 January 2008 | |
| FI | Finland | | | | | 1 May 2011 | Territory also covered by EM |
| FR | France | 20 October 1930 | 25 June 1939- 18 October 2016 | 1 August 1984 | 27 September 1975 | 18 March 2007 | Territory also covered by EM; Including all territories |
| GA | Gabon | | | 18 August 2003 | 18 August 2003 | | Territory also covered by OA |
| GE | Georgia | | | 1 August 2003 | 1 August 2003 | 23 December 2003 | |
| DE | Germany | 1 June 1928 | 13 June 1939- 18 October 2016 | 1 August 1984 | 27 September 1975 | 13 February 2010 | Territory also covered by EM; Stockholm and Hague act: Including "Land Berlin" |
| GH | Ghana | | | | | 16 September 2008 | |
| GR | Greece | | | 18 April 1997 | 18 April 1997 | 13 February 2024 | Territory also covered by EM |
| HU | Hungary | | 7 April 1984- 1 February 2005 | 1 August 1984 | 7 April 1984 | 1 May 2004 | Territory also covered by EM |
| IS | Iceland | | | | | 23 December 2003 | |
| ID | Indonesia | | 27 December 1949- 3 June 2010 | | | | |
| IL | Israel | | | | | 3 January 2020 | |
| IT | Italy | | | 13 June 1997 | 13 August 1987 | 14 March 2024 | Territory also covered by EM |
| JM | Jamaica | | | | | 10 February 2022 | |
| JP | Japan | | | | | 13 May 2015 | |
| KG | Kyrgyzstan | | | 17 March 2003 | 17 March 2003 | 23 December 2003 | Territory also covered by EA |
| LA | Laos | | | | | 10 October 2026 | |
| LV | Latvia | | | | | 26 July 2005 | Territory also covered by EM |
| LI | Liechtenstein | 14 July 1933 | 28 January 1951- 18 October 2016 | 1 August 1984 | 27 September 1975 | 23 December 2003 | |
| LT | Lithuania | | | | | 26 September 2008 | Territory also covered by EM |
| BX | Luxembourg | | | 1 August 1984 | 28 May 1979 | 18 December 2018 | Territory also covered by EM |
| ML | Mali | | | 7 September 2006 | 7 September 2006 | | Territory also covered by OA |
| MU | Mauritius | | | | | 6 May 2023 | |
| MK | North Macedonia | | | 18 March 1997 | 18 March 1997 | 22 March 2006 | |
| MX | Mexico | | | | | 6 June 2020 | |
| MD | Moldova | | | 14 March 1994 | 14 March 1994 | 23 December 2003 | |
| MC | Monaco | | 29 April 1956- 18 October 2016 | 1 August 1984 | 27 September 1975 | 9 June 2011 | |
| MN | Mongolia | | | 12 April 1997 | 12 April 1997 | 19 January 2008 | |
| ME | Montenegro | | | 3 June 2006 | 3 June 2006 | 5 March 2012 | succession from Serbia and Montenegro |
| MA | Morocco | 20 October 1930 | 21 January 1941- 18 October 2016 | 13 October 1999 | 12 October 1999 | | |
| NA | Namibia | | | | | 13 June 2004 | |
| BX | Netherlands | 1 June 1928- 1 January 1975 | 5 August 1948- 1 January 1975 | 1 August 1984 | 28 June 1979 | 18 December 2018 | Territory also covered by EM; London Act incl Dutch East Indies (-1950), Suriname (-1975), Netherlands Antilles (-2010), Aruba (1986–2011), Curaçao, Sint Maarten and Caribbean Netherlands (2010–2011) |
| NE | Niger | | | 20 September 2004 | 20 September 2004 | | Territory also covered by OA |
| KP | North Korea | | | 27 May 1992 | 27 May 1992 | 13 September 2016 | |
| NO | Norway | | | | | 17 June 2010 | |
| OM | Oman | | | | | 4 March 2009 | |
| PL | Poland | | | | | 2 July 2009 | Territory also covered by EM |
| RO | Romania | | | 18 July 1992 | 18 July 1992 | 23 December 2003 | Territory also covered by EM |
| RU | Russia | | | | | 28 February 2018 | Territory also covered by EA |
| RW | Rwanda | | | | | 31 August 2011 | |
| KN | Saint Kitts and Nevis | | | | | 8 October 2024 | |
| WS | Samoa | | | | | 2 January 2020 | |
| SM | San Marino | | | | | 26 January 2019 | |
| ST | Sao Tome and Principe | | | | | 8 December 2008 | |
| SA | Saudi Arabia | | | | | 7 April 2025 | |
| SN | Senegal | | 30 June 1984- 18 October 2016 | 1 August 1984 | 30 June 1984 | | Territory also covered by OA |
| RS | Serbia | | | 30 December 1993 | 30 December 1993 | 9 December 2009 | |
| SG | Singapore | | | | | 17 December 2005 | |
| SI | Slovenia | | | 13 January 1995 | 13 January 1995 | 23 December 2003 | Territory also covered by EM |
| KR | South Korea | | | | | 1 July 2014 | |
| ES | Spain | 1 June 1928 | 2 March 1956- 18 October 2016 | | | 23 December 2003 | Territory also covered by EM; Hague agreement and London Act: Including Spanish Morocco (-1956) and Colonies (1947–1975) |
| SR | Suriname | | 25 November 1975- 18 October 2016 | 1 August 1984 | 23 February 1977 | | |
| CH | Switzerland | 1 June 1928 | 24 November 1939- 19 November 2010 | 1 August 1984 | 27 September 1975 | 23 December 2003 | |
| SY | Syria | | | | | 7 May 2008 | |
| TJ | Tajikistan | | | | | 21 March 2012 | Territory also covered by EA |
| -- | Tangier | 6 March 1936- 1956 | 13 June 1939- 1956 | | | | now part of Morocco |
| TN | Tunisia | 20 October 1930 | 4 October 1942- 18 October 2016 | | | 13 June 2012 | |
| TR | Turkey | | | | | 1 January 2005 | |
| TM | Turkmenistan | | | | | 16 March 2016 | Territory also covered by EA |
| UA | Ukraine | | | 28 August 2002 | 28 August 2002 | 23 December 2003 | |
| UK | United Kingdom | | | | | 13 June 2018 | Territory until 2021 also covered by EM. Incl. Isle of Man (2018-) and Guernsey (2021-) |
| US | United States | | | | | 13 May 2015 | |
| UZ | Uzbekistan | | | | | 10 January 2025 | |
| VA | Vatican | | 29 June 1960- 4 August 2007 | | | | |
| VN | Vietnam | | | | | 30 December 2019 | |

Notes

A list of the Contracting Parties is maintained by WIPO.

== Use of the system ==
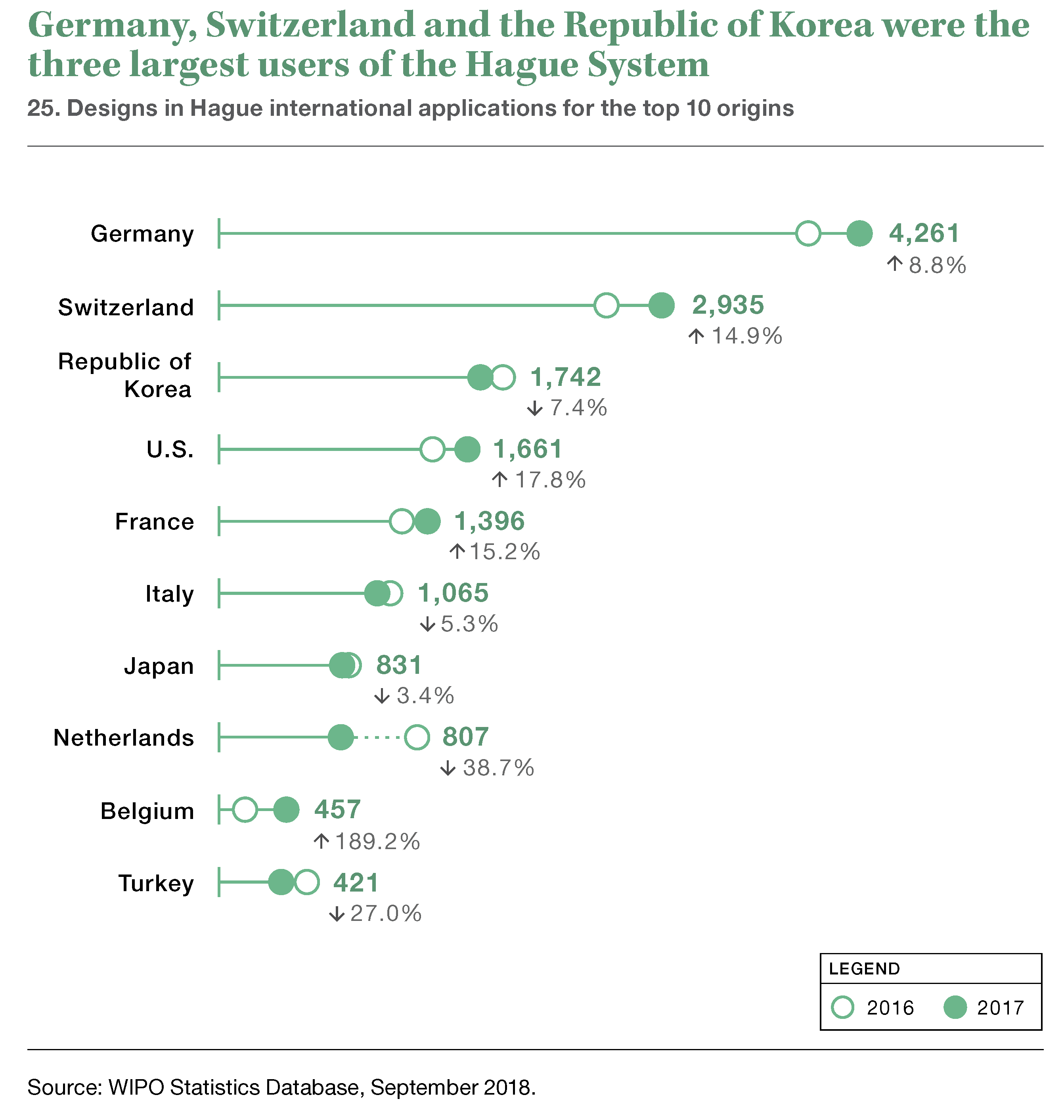
Germany, Switzerland and the Republic of Korea were the three largest users of the Hague System in 2017

=== Qualification to use the Hague system ===
Applicants can qualify to use the Hague system on the basis of any of the following criteria:

- the applicant is a national of a Contracting Party (i.e. member country)
- the applicant is domiciled in a Contracting Party
- the applicant has a real and effective industrial or commercial establishment in a Contracting Party
- the applicant has their habitual residence in a Contracting Party (only available if the Contracting Party in question has adhered to the 1999 (Geneva) Act)

An applicant who does not qualify under one of these headings cannot use the Hague system. The Contracting Parties include not only individual countries, but also intergovernmental organisations such as the African Intellectual Property Organization (OAPI) and the European Union. This means an applicant domiciled in an EU member country that is not a Contracting Party, such as Austria, can nevertheless use the Hague system on the basis of his or her domicile in the European Union.

=== Application requirements ===
An application may be filed in English, French, or Spanish, at the choice of the applicant. The application must contain one or more views of the designs concerned and can include up to 100 different designs provided that the designs are all in the same class of the International Classification of Industrial Designs (Locarno Classification).

The application fee is composed of three types of fees: a basic fee, a publication fee, and a designation fee for each designated Contracting Party.

=== Examination and registration procedure ===
The application is examined for formal requirements by the International Bureau of WIPO, which provides the applicant with the opportunity to correct certain irregularities in the application. Once the formal requirements have been met, it is recorded in the International Register and details are published electronically in the International Designs Bulletin on the WIPO website.

If any designated Contracting Party considers that a design which has been registered for protection in that Contracting Party does not meet its domestic criteria for registrability (e.g. it finds that the design is not novel), it must notify the International Bureau that it refuses the registration for that Contracting Party. In every Contracting Party that does not issue such a refusal, the international registration takes effect and provides the same protection as if the design(s) had been registered under the domestic law of that Contracting Party.

=== Publication ===
Standard publication of Hague applications is 12 months after filing. The applicant, however, can request either immediate publication, or delayed publication of up to 30 months.

=== Duration and renewal ===
The duration of an international registration is five years, extendable in further five-year periods up to the maximum duration permitted by each Contracting Party. For the 1934 London Act the maximum term was 15 years.

Renewals are handled centrally by the International Bureau. The applicant pays a renewal fee and notifies the International Bureau of the countries for which the registration is to be renewed.

== Top applicants between 1998 to 2024 ==
Top Hague applicants, 1998-2024
| Rank | Applicant | Origin | Published Registrations |
|---|---|---|---|
| 1 | LG Electronics Inc. | South Korea | 3716 |
| 2 | Swatch AG | Switzerland | 2333 |
| 3- | Samsung Electronics Co., Ltd. | South Korea | 1927 |
| 4 | Koninklijke Philips Electronics N.V. | Netherlands | 1388 |
| 5 | Procter & Gamble Co. | United States | 1242 |
| 6 | Volkswagen AG | Germany | 1020 |
| 7 | Hyundai Motor Company | South Korea | 981 |
| 8 | Hermès Sellier | France | 885 |
| 9 | Beijing Xiaomi Mobile Software Co., Ltd. | China | 749 |
| 10 | Daimler AG | Germany | 691 |
| 11 | Gillette Company | United States | 460 |
| 12 | Interior's S.A. | France | 455 |

== See also ==
- Industrial design
- WIPO Hague System
