= Locarno Agreement Establishing an International Classification for Industrial Designs =

- Type: Industrial property
- Signed: October 8, 1968
- Effective: Novembre 4, 1981
- Parties: 65
- Depositary: Switzerland Government
- Languages: English and French

The Locarno Agreement Establishing an International Classification for Industrial Designs, commonly known as the Locarno Agreement, is an international treaty signed in Locarno, Switzerland, on October 8, 1968. It establishes a common classification system for industrial designs relating to industrial property, through a list of classes and subclasses, as well as an alphabetical list of products that may be the subject of designs and models. This classification is known as the Locarno Classification. The treaty is administered by the World Intellectual Property Organization (WIPO), which is also responsible for publishing the classification.

== The Locarno Agreement ==
Signed in 1968, the Agreement was amended on September 28, 1979, and as of August 2026 had 65 contracting parties. Any state that is a party to the Paris Convention for the Protection of Industrial Property of 1883 may accede to the Locarno Agreement.

The Agreement also establishes a special union of the contracting countries known as the Locarno Union, and a Committee of Experts whose main function is the periodic revision of the Locarno Classification. Since 2017, this revision has been conducted biennially. The current version of the classification is the 15th edition, in force since January 1, 2025.

== Locarno Classification ==
According to the text of the Agreement (Article 2.1), the classification "shall be solely of an administrative character" and "shall not bind the countries of the Special Union as regards the nature and scope of the protection afforded to the design in those countries."

The Locarno Classification comprises:

- a list of classes and subclasses;
- an alphabetical list of goods which constitute industrial designs, with an indication of the classes and subclasses into which they fall;
- explanatory notes.

In its most recent version published in 2024 and valid since January, 2025, the Locarno Classification included 32 classes, each with its own subclasses; meanwhile, the alphabetical list of products contained more than 5,000 entries.

== See also ==
- Hague Agreement Concerning the International Deposit of Industrial Designs
