= Organisation Africaine de la Propriété Intellectuelle =

OAPI logo

The Organisation Africaine de la Propriété Intellectuelle or OAPI ('African Intellectual Property Organization' (Note: The English language version of this organization's Web page at http://oapi.int/index.php/en/ has a meta tag which describes the page as "The African Organization for Intellectual Property Portal".)) is an intellectual property organization, headquartered in Yaoundé, Cameroon. The organisation was created by Bangui Agreement Relating to the Creation of an African Intellectual Property Organization of March 2, 1977. The Bangui Agreement was subsequently amended in 1999 and 2015, and entered into force on November 14, 2020.

Its 17 member states are mostly French-speaking countries.

== Members ==
Map of Africa showing OAPI member states

1. Benin (Accession to the 1977 Bangui Agreement: March 19, 1983)
2. Burkina Faso (Accession to the 1977 Bangui Agreement: June 1, 1983)
3. Cameroon (Accession to the 1977 Bangui Agreement: February 8, 1982)
4. Central African Republic (Accession to the 1977 Bangui Agreement: February 8, 1982)
5. Chad (Accession to the 1977 Bangui Agreement: November 5, 1988)
6. Comoros (Accession to the 1977 Bangui Agreement: May 25, 2013)
7. Congo (Accession to the 1977 Bangui Agreement: February 8, 1982)
8. Ivory Coast (Accession to the 1977 Bangui Agreement: February 8, 1982)
9. Equatorial Guinea (Accession to the 1977 Bangui Agreement: November 23, 2000)
10. Gabon (Accession to the 1977 Bangui Agreement: February 8, 1982)
11. Guinea (Accession to the 1977 Bangui Agreement: January 18, 1990)
12. Guinea-Bissau (Accession to the 1977 Bangui Agreement: July 8, 1998)
13. Mali (Accession to the 1977 Bangui Agreement: September 30, 1984)
14. Mauritania (Accession to the 1977 Bangui Agreement: February 8, 1982)
15. Niger (Accession to the 1977 Bangui Agreement: February 8, 1982)
16. Senegal (Accession to the 1977 Bangui Agreement: February 8, 1982)
17. Togo (Accession to the 1977 Bangui Agreement: February 8, 1982)

== Objectives ==
The Bangui agreement gave the following responsibilities to OAPI:

1. To implement and apply common administrative procedure deriving from a uniform system for the protection of industrial property as well as the provision of international agreements in this field to which the Member States of the organisation have acceded and providing services related to industrial property.
2. To contribute to the promotion of the protection of literary and artistic property as an expression of cultural and social values.
3. To encourage the creation of associations of national authors in those Member States where such bodies do not exist.
4. To centralise, coordinate and disseminate information of all kinds relating to the protection of literary and artistic property and communicating that information to any state party to the agreement that request for it.
5. To promote the economic development of Member States notably by means of effective protection of Intellectual Property and related rights.
6. To provide intellectual property training.
7. To undertake any other assignment connected with its objective that might be entrusted to it by the Member States.

== Organs ==
The organisation has three organs: The Administrative Council; the High Commission of Appeal; and the Directorate General.

=== Administrative Council ===
The Administrative Council consists of representatives of OAPI Member States. Their functions include drawing up regulations for the implementation of the agreement, establishing the financial regulations and the fees to be paid, supervising the implementation of the regulation and creating ad hoc committees on specific issues. They are also to draw up appropriate regulations for the implementation of six international treaties and agreements, which all the Member States has agreed to enter under the Agreements. The official sessions of the Administrative Council are held annually though unofficial sessions can be called at any time to address pressing issues. The council is headed and chaired by a president.

=== High Commission of Appeal ===
The High Commission of Appeal is composed of three members selected by drawing lots from a list of representatives designated by Member States. Its functions include to rule on appeal from rejections of applications for titles of industrial property protection, rejections of request for the maintenance or extension of terms of protection, rejection of requests for reinstatement and decisions on opposition.

=== Directorate General ===
The Directorate General is placed under the authority of the Director General and responsible for the executive work of the organisation. It is responsible for the daily activities of the organisation and implements the decisions of the Administrative Council and other tasks arising from provisions of the agreement.

=== OAPI Centre for Mediation and Arbitration ===
The OAPI Centre for Mediation and Arbitration is a neutral, international and non-profit dispute resolution provider that offers alternative dispute resolution (ADR) options. OAPI mediation, arbitration, expedited arbitration, and expert determination enable private parties to settle their domestic or cross-border IP and technology disputes out of court.

== Current administration ==
The organisation is currently headed by Denis Loukou Bohoussou (from Côte d'Ivoire) following his installation ceremony on 31 July 2017 at OAPI’s headquarters in Yaounde, Cameroon. Bohoussou will serve a five-year term and replaces Paulin Edou Edou (of Gabon) who was OAPI’s Director-General for ten years (2007-2017).

Jean-Baptiste Wago (from the Central African Republic) is the Deputy Director-General, and Touré Serigne Momar Nasir (from Senegal) is the Financial Controller.

== International treaties/agreements ==
- Berne Convention (all countries are members).
- Convention Relating to the Distribution of Programme-Carrying Signals Transmitted by Satellite (only Togo a member).
- Budapest Treaty (OAPI is the member).
- Cooperation Agreement between OAPI and EAPO.
- Hague Agreement Concerning the International Deposit of Industrial Designs (OAPI is a member) (9 countries are members; Burkina Faso, Cameroon, Equatorial Guinea, Guinea, Guinea-Bissau, Mauritania and Togo are not yet members).
- Lisbon Agreement on Appellations of Origin (only Burkina Faso, Congo, Gabon and Togo are members).
- Locarno Agreement on Classification of Designs (only Guinea is a member).
- Madrid Agreement Concerning the International Registration of Marks.
- Nairobi Treaty on Olympic Symbol (only Congo, Equatorial Guinea, Senegal and Togo are members).
- Nice Agreement on Classification of Marks.
- Paris Convention (all countries are members).
- Patent Cooperation Treaty (PCT) (all countries are members).
- Phonograms Convention.
- Rome Convention (only Burkina Faso, Congo, Niger and Togo are members).
- Strasbourg Agreement on Patent Classification (only Guinea is a member).
- Trade Mark Law Treaty (only Burkina Faso and Guinea are members).
- Vienna Agreement on Figurative Elements of Marks (only Guinea is a member).
- WIPO Convention (all countries are members).
- WIPO Copyright Treaty (only Benin, Burkina, Faso, Gabon, Guinea, Mali, Senegal and Togo are members).
- WIPO Performances and Phonograms Treaty (only Benin, Burkina Faso, Gabon, Guinea, Mali, Senegal and Togo are members).
- WTO/TRIPS (all countries are members except Equatorial Guinea).

== Rights covered ==
The Bangui Agreement covers patents, utility models, trademarks, industrial design right, trade names, geographical indications, copyright, unfair competition, integrated circuit layouts and plant variety rights.

=== Patents ===
Patent matters are dealt with in Annex I of the Bangui Agreement. Patent applications must be filed at the OAPI office. Alternatively, member states may require that applicants domiciled in the territory of a member state must first file the application with the national administration (OAPI Liaison office) of the member state. In that case, the application must be transmitted to OAPI by the national administration within a period of five days.

OAPI member countries are also members of the Paris Convention, the Budapest treaty, the Patent Cooperation Treaty (PCT) and the TRIPS Agreement.

Since OAPI is a member of the Patent Cooperation Treaty (PCT), patent protection may also be obtained by way of a PCT application.

=== Trademarks ===
The Bangui Agreement, in Annex III, provides for the protection of trade marks, including service marks, and for well-known marks. Specific provision is made for the registration of collective marks. OAPI is now a member of the Madrid Agreement. With this accession by OAPI, the Madrid System now provides brand owners the potential to protect their products through one international application covering more than 100 countries.

=== Tradenames ===
The Bangui Agreement in Annex V provides for the protection of tradenames or commercial names.

=== Geographical indication ===
The Bangui Agreement in Annex VI provides for the protection of Geographical indication.

=== Industrial design ===
Design matters are dealt with in Annex IV of the Bangui Agreement. Design applications must be filed at the OAPI office or with the Ministry in a member state responsible for industrial property. In the latter case, the Ministry must transmit the application to the OAPI office within five days.

OAPI is a member of the Hague Agreement Concerning the International Deposit of Industrial Designs. As such, design protection in OAPI can be obtained either via an OAPI application or via an international application under the Hague, designating OAPI.

== See also ==
- African Regional Intellectual Property Organization (ARIPO)
- World Intellectual Property Organization (WIPO)
- Paris Convention for the Protection of Industrial Property (Paris Convention)
