= Design patent =

US Patent Law

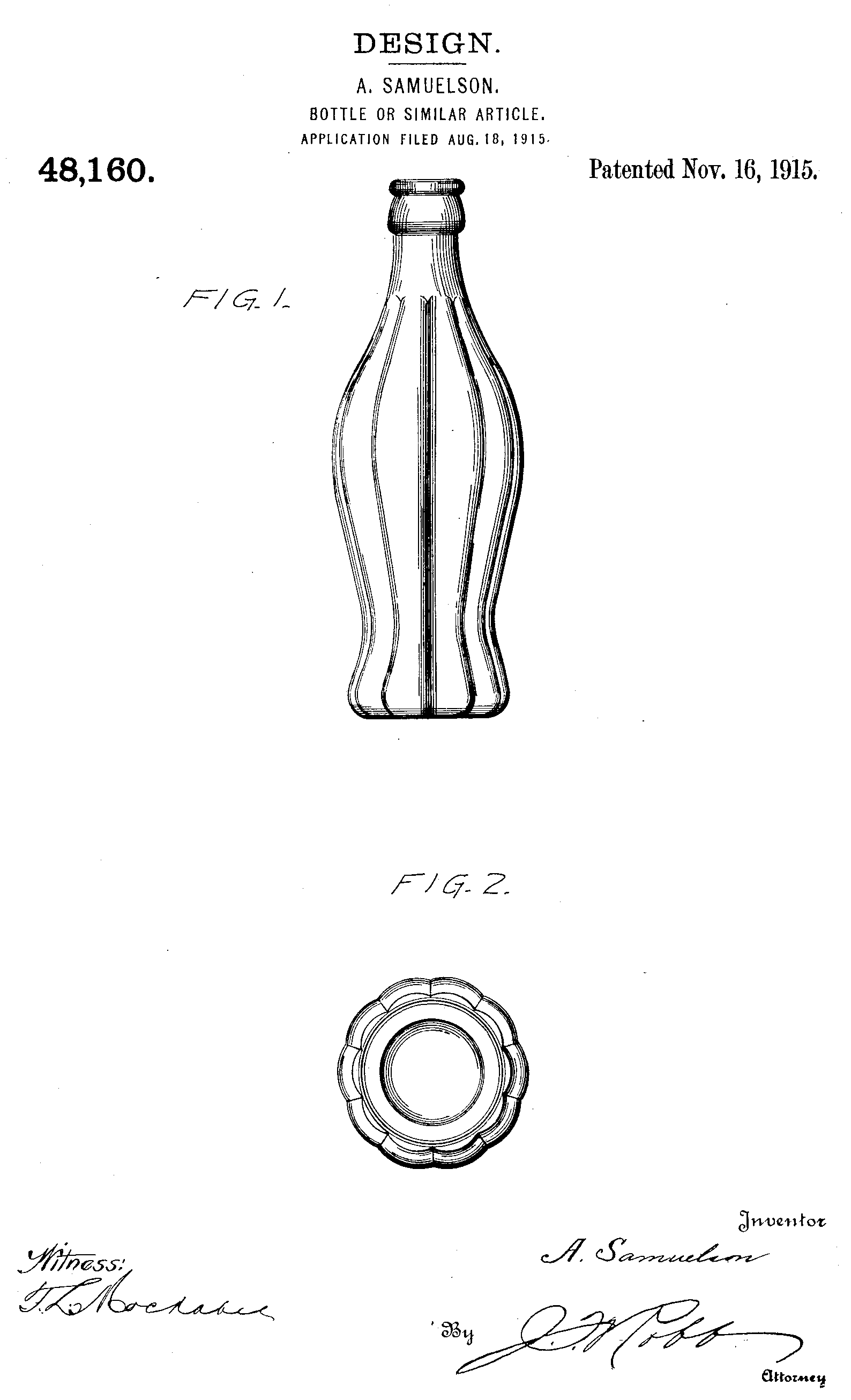
US design patent D48,160 for the original Coca-Cola bottle

In the United States, a design patent is a form of legal protection granted to the ornamental design of an article of manufacture. Design patents are a type of industrial design right. Ornamental designs of jewelry, furniture, beverage containers (Fig. 1) and computer icons are examples of objects that are covered by design patents.

A similar intellectual property right, a registered design, can be obtained in other countries. In Kenya, Japan, South Korea and Hungary, industrial designs are registered after performing an official novelty search. In the countries of the European Community, one needs to only pay an official fee and meet other formal requirements for registration (e.g. Community design at EUIPO, Germany, France, Spain).

For the member states of WIPO, cover is afforded by registration at WIPO and examination by the designated member states in accordance with the Hague Agreement. This allows for broad worldwide coverage of a design by filing a single application in a single language (e.g. English).

== Protections ==
Apple v Samsung showing the effect of solid and broken lines on infringement

A US design patent covers the ornamental design of an article of manufacture. An object with a design that is substantially similar in appearance to the design claimed in a design patent cannot be made, used, sold or imported into the United States without the permission of the patent holder. The object does not have to be exact for the patent to be infringed. It only has to be substantially similar in overall appearance. Design patents with line drawings cover only the features shown as solid lines. Items shown in broken lines are not covered. This is one of the reasons Apple was awarded a jury verdict in the US case of Apple v. Samsung. Apple's patent showed much of their iPhone design as broken lines. It didn't matter if Samsung was different in those areas. The fact that the solid lines of the patent were the same as Samsung's design meant that Samsung infringed the Apple design patent.

Design patents are subject to both the novelty and non-obviousness standards of the patent code. However, because design patents are not measured based on the utility of the designs to which they are directed, there is an open question as to how to measure the non-obviousness of an ornamental design. There is substantial case law, however, on how to evaluate design patent non-obviousness.

Once a design patent has been submitted, it begins a term of protection. In the United States, for a design patent whose application was submitted on or after May 13, 2015, that patent has a term limit of 15 years from its date of grant. For a design patent whose application was submitted prior to that date, the term limit is 14 years from the date of grant. During this period the patent holder is entitled to bring a lawsuit against any entity that infringes on that patent; once the term expires, it may not be renewed and the design patent ceases to receive protection in US courts.

== Computer images ==
Both novel fonts and computer icons can be covered by design patents. Icons are only covered, however, when they are displayed on a computer screen, thus making them part of an article of manufacture with practical utility. Screen layouts can also be protected with design patents.

== Publication of application ==
In China, Canada, Japan, South Africa, and the United States, a design patent application is not published and is kept secret until granted.

In Brazil, the applicant can request that the application be kept in secrecy for a period of 180 days from the filing date. This will also delay the prosecution and granting of the application for 180 days.

In Japan, an applicant can request that a design be kept secret for a period of up 3 years after the registration has been granted.

== Notable design patents ==
PDF of U. S. Patent D11023

- In 1842, George Bruce was awarded the first design patent, U.S. patent D1. The design patent was for a new font.
- In 1879, Frédéric Auguste Bartholdi was awarded design patent U.S. patent D11,023 for the Statue of Liberty. This patent covered the sale of small copies of the statue. Proceeds from the sale of the statues helped raise money to build the full statue in New York Harbor.
- In 1919, three design patents were granted for the badge of the American Legion, U.S. patent D54,296; the badge of the American Legion Women's Auxiliary, U.S. patent D55,398; and the badge of the Sons of the American Legion, U.S. patent D92,187. The original terms of these patents were to have expired in 1933, but Congress has continually extended their protection. The patents were extended for an additional fourteen-year term by an amendment to the National Defense Authorization Act in 2007 that passed the Senate on June 22, 2006.
- In 1936, Frank A. Redford was awarded U.S. patent D98,617 for the Wigwam Motel.
- Apple Inc. owns various patents regarding the design of the iPhone smartphone line and its related products.

== Other forms of protection ==
=== Utility patents ===
US utility patents protect the functionality of a given item, i.e., how a product works. Providing the maintenance fees are paid, utility patents are generally valid for up to 20 years from the date of filing (with some exceptions).

Design patents cover the ornamental appearance of an item. Design patents can be invalidated if the design is dictated solely by function (e.g. the outline of a key blade blank). Design patents are valid for 14 years from the date of issue if filed prior to May 13, 2015, or 15 years from the date of issue if filed on or after May 13, 2015. There are no maintenance fees.

"In general terms, a “utility patent” protects the way an article is used and works (35 U.S.C. 101), while a “design patent” protects the way an article looks (35 U.S.C. 171). The ornamental appearance for an article includes its shape/configuration or surface ornamentation applied to the article, or both. Both design and utility patents may be obtained on an article if its novelty resides both in its utility and ornamental appearance."MPEP - Distinction Between Design and Utility Patents

=== Copyright ===
Copyright prevents nonfunctional items from being copied. To show copyright infringement, the plaintiff must show the infringing item was copied from the original. The copyrighted artistic expression must either have no substantial practical utility (e.g. a statue) or be separable from the useful substrate (e.g. picture on a coffee mug).

Design patents, on the other hand, protect the ornamental aspects of an article of manufacture from being infringed. One does not have to show that the infringing item was copied from the original. Thus a design that was arrived at independently can still infringe a design patent.

Many objects can be covered by both copyright and design patents. The Statue of Liberty is one such example.

=== Trademark and trade dress ===
Trademarks and trade dress are used to protect consumers from confusion as to the source of specified goods. To get trademark protection, the trademark owner must show that the mark is non-functional, is distinctive, and is not likely to be confused with other trademarks for items in the same general class. The trademarks can last indefinitely as long as they are used in commerce.

Design patents are only granted if the design is novel and not obvious over prior art designs, generally even those of different articles of manufacture than the patented object. An actual shield of a given shape, for example, might be cited as prior art against a design patent on a computer icon with a shield shape. However, recent case law has held that the shape of an art tool cannot be cited as anticipatory prior art against the substantially identical shape of a lip implant. The validity of design patents is not affected by whether or not the design is commercialized.

Items can be covered by both trademarks and design patents. The contour bottle of Coca-Cola, for example, was covered by a now expired design patent, U.S. patent D48,160, but is still however protected by at least a US registered trademark.

== See also ==
- Geschmacksmuster
- Industrial design rights
- Intellectual property organizations
- Office for Harmonization in the Internal Market, Designs (OHIM) (European Union)
- Patent
- Japanese design law
