= Utility model =

Patent-like intellectual property right

A utility model is a patent-like intellectual property right to protect inventions. This type of right is available in many countries but, notably, not in the United States, United Kingdom or Canada. Although a utility model is similar to a patent, it is generally cheaper to obtain and maintain, has a shorter term (generally 6 to 15 years), shorter grant lag, and less stringent patentability requirements. In some countries, it is only available for inventions in certain fields of technology and/or only for products. Utility models can be described as second-class patents.

While no international convention requires countries to protect utility models (unlike copyright, trade marks or patents) and they are not subject to the TRIPS agreement, they are subject to the Paris Convention for the Protection of Industrial Property, which means that countries that do protect utility models are required to comply with rules such as national treatment and priority. Utility models are also available (in countries that have a utility model system) via the Patent Cooperation Treaty (PCT) system of international patent applications.

Kind codes for utility models begin with U, Y, and Z for the first, second, and third levels of publication, respectively.

== Definition and terminology ==
A utility model is a statutory exclusive right granted for a limited period of time (the so-called "term") in exchange for an inventor providing sufficient teaching of his or her invention to permit a person of ordinary skill in the relevant art to perform the invention. The rights conferred by utility model laws are similar to those granted by patent laws, but are more suited to what may be considered as "incremental inventions". Specifically, a utility model is a "right to prevent others, for a limited period of time, from commercially using a protected invention without the authorization of the right holder(s)."

Terms such as "petty patent", "innovation patent", “short-term patents”, "minor patent", and "small patent" are generally considered to fall within the definition of "utility model". The German and Austrian utility model is called the "Gebrauchsmuster", which influenced some other countries such as Japan.

== Requirements for grant ==
Most countries having utility model laws require that the invention be new. However, many patent or utility model offices do not conduct substantive examination and merely grant the utility model after checking that utility model applications comply with formalities. This is why for a utility model the granting process is sometimes called simply registration of the utility model. Furthermore, some countries exclude particular subject-matter from utility model protection. For example, in some countries, methods (i.e., processes), chemical substances, plants and animals are barred from utility model protection.

=== Australia ===
The law in Australia provided for the grant of a utility model known, between 2001 and 2021 when it was phased out, as an innovation patent. From 1979 to 2001, a similar regime existed under the name "petty patent". For an innovation patent to be valid the invention claimed must be novel and involve an innovative step. An invention will lack novelty if it has already been disclosed to the public through prior publication or prior use anywhere in the world. Publication within a "grace period" of 12 months prior to the filing date of an innovation patent with the consent of the applicant is not considered to form part of the prior art for the assessment of novelty. The innovative step requirement is supposedly a lesser requirement than the inventive step required for a standard patent under Australian law. An invention will involve an innovative step if there are differences between the invention and the prior art, that make a substantial contribution to the working of the invention.

An innovation patent is granted automatically after a formalities check without substantive examination, however, infringement proceedings cannot be instituted unless and until the innovation patent has been certified, which requires a substantive examination. Examination cannot proceed until the innovation patent has been granted. Innovation patents have a maximum term of eight years subject to payment of annual renewal fees payable from the second anniversary of the date of filing. Innovation patents are available to persons outside Australia, but an Australian address for service must be provided. Innovation patent specifications must be prepared by a registered patent attorney unless the application proceeds as a Convention application or as a divisional application. Innovation patent applications cannot proceed as national phase of an international patent application (see Patent Cooperation Treaty), but can proceed as a divisional application from an international patent application that is open to public inspection.

=== European Union ===
In 1997, the European Commission proposed the harmonisation of utility model laws across all EU countries. In 1999, the proposal was updated. No agreement could be reached, and in 2006 the proposal was withdrawn.

=== Germany ===
In Germany, a utility model is considered to be new if it does not form part of the state of the art. The state of the art comprises any knowledge made available to the public by means of a written description or by use within Germany before the date relevant for the priority of the application. Description or use within the six months preceding the date relevant for the priority of the application shall not be taken into consideration if it is based on the conception of the applicant or his predecessor in title.

=== Italy ===
In Italy, a utility model (in Italian: 'Modello d'utilità') is considered to be new if it does not form part of the state of the art. The state of the art comprises any knowledge made available to the public by means of a written or oral disclosure, anywhere in the World, before the filing date of the application or the priority date (if claimed). The utility model must also involve an inventive step, i.e. machines, devices or items which are claimed in the utility models must be more effective and/or easier to use than the ones according to prior art. Utility models cannot claim processes or methods. At the time of filing the application a filing fee is due which also covers the maintenance for years 1 to 4. No claim fee is provided. The Italian Patent and Trademark Office (UIBM) does not perform substantive examination of the application in order to assess novelty and inventive step of what is claimed; the examination is limited to formal requirements only. Publication occurs at 18 months from the filing date or the oldest priority date, if any; at the time of filing the application the applicant may request advance publication, which normally occurs within 90 days. In any case only bibliographic data are published after 1 month from the filing. Grant generally occurs within 2 years. The validity of an Italian utility model is ascertained by the Judge and his/her technical expert, during litigation. At the end of the fourth year from the filing of the application, a maintenance fee for the years 5 to 10 falls due. Foreign companies/residents must indicate an address of service in Italy, that may correspond to the domicile of a lawyer or, as always occurs, a chartered patent attorney.

=== Japan ===
In Japan, a utility model is considered to be new if it has not been made available to the public by means of a written description or by use before the date relevant for the priority of the application (same as for patents). Japanese utility models are not subject to substantive examination, but the owner must request one or more "reports on technical opinion" before instituting infringement proceedings.

=== Russian Federation ===
Unlike patent claims, which can be issued in Russia on processes and compositions-of-matter, Russian utility model claims are limited to devices only. Other requirements include novelty and industrial applicability. Noteworthy, although in assessing novelty any printed material anywhere in the world constitutes prior art for both utility models and patents, public use outside of Russia is considered as prior art only for patents, but not for utility models.

Unlike in most other countries, having a patent and a utility model for the same invention is not allowed in Russia. However, it is possible to have a Russian utility model and a Eurasian patent for the same invention. The main advantage of a utility model in Russia is a very short prosecution time (usually, no more than 6 moths) and a low cost. The duration of a utility model is 10 years from the priority date, and this term cannot be extended (since 2014).

During an infringement litigation in Russia, the doctrine of equivalence can be used with patents, but not with utility models. Also, it is not possible to convert an issued patent into a utility model to avoid the revocation of the patent in the post-issuance proceedings before Rospatent or courts, although the law to correct this situation has been considered by the Duma.

=== Spain ===
In Spain, (Spanish: modelo de utilidad), when assessing inventive step, it is evaluated whether the invention is not “very obvious” to the person skilled in the art. In contrast, for patents, that requirement is defined as "obvious", which means that it is softer for utility models due to the introduction of the term "very". In relation to sufficiency of disclosure and absolute novelty, the same standard is applied as for patents.

Recent changes in Spanish patent law have opened the door to protect more types of inventions. The exclusions from the scope of protection of utility models are processes, inventions aimed at biological matter, and pharmaceutical substances and compositions intended for use as a medicament in human or veterinary medicine.

== Availability and names ==
Utility model applications may be prepared and filed at local patent offices in countries where utility model protection is available.

The table below is a list of countries having utility model protection under various names as at March 2008.

Country	Type of protection	Maximum term	PCT route available	Conversion from patent application
Albania	utility model	10 years	Yes	Yes
Angola	utility model	no set term	No	No
Argentina	utility model	10 years	No	Yes
ARIPO(†)	utility model	8 years	Yes	Yes
Armenia	utility model	10 years	Yes	Yes
Aruba	small patent	6 years	No	Yes
Australia	innovation patent	8 years	Not unless by division	Yes
Austria	utility model	10 years	Yes	Yes by division
Azerbaijan	utility model	unknown	Yes	Yes
Belarus	utility model	8 years	Yes	unknown
Belize	utility model	7 years	Yes	Yes
Bolivia	utility model	10 years	No	unknown
Botswana	utility model	7 years	Yes	unknown
Brazil	utility model	15 years	Yes	probably
Bulgaria	utility model	10 years	Yes	probably
Chile	utility model	10 years	No	Yes
China	utility model patent	10 years	Yes	Yes
Colombia	utility model	10 years	Yes	probably by division
Costa Rica	utility model	12 years	Yes	Yes
Czech Republic	utility model	10 years	Yes	Yes by division
Denmark	utility model	10 years	Yes	Yes by division
Ecuador	utility model	10 years	Yes	Yes by division
Estonia	utility model	10 years	Yes	Yes
Ethiopia	utility model	10 years	No	Yes
Finland	utility model	10 years	Yes	Yes
France	utility certificate [N/A]	6 years	No	Yes
Georgia	utility model	8 years	Yes	Yes
Germany	utility model	10 years	Yes	Yes
Ghana	utility model	7 years	Yes	Yes
Greece	utility model	7 years	No	Yes
Guatemala	utility model	10 years	Yes	Yes
Honduras	utility model	15 years	Yes	unknown
Hungary	utility model	10 years	Yes	Yes
Indonesia	Petty Patent/Simple Patent	10 years	Yes	Yes (No°)
Ireland	short term patent	10 years	No	Yes
Italy	utility model	10 years	No	Yes
Japan	utility model	10 – 15 years	Yes	Yes
Kazakhstan	utility model	8 years	Yes	Yes
Kenya	utility model	10 years (From date of registration)	Yes	Yes
Korea (south)	utility patent	10 years	Yes	Yes
Kuwait	utility model	7 years	No	unknown
Kyrgyzstan	utility model	unknown	Yes	unknown
Laos	petty patent	7 years	No	unknown
Lesotho	utility model	7 years	Yes	Yes
Macau	utility model	unknown	No	unknown
Malaysia	utility innovation	20 years	Not directly (+)	Yes
Mexico	utility model	10 years	Yes	Yes.
Moldova	utility model	unknown	Yes	probably
Mozambique	utility model	unknown	Yes	probably
Netherlands	short term patent (*)	6 years	No	unknown
Nicaragua	utility model	unknown	Yes	probably
OAPI(‡)	utility model	8 years	Yes	probably not
Panama	utility model	10 years	No	unknown
Peru	utility model patent	5 years	No	Yes
Philippines	utility model	7 years	Yes	Yes
Poland	utility model	10 years	Yes	Yes
Portugal	utility model	6–10 years	Yes	Yes
Russia	utility model	10 years	Yes	Yes
Sierra Leone	utility model	7 years	Yes	Yes
Slovakia	utility model	10 years	Yes	Yes
Slovenia	short term patent	10 years	Yes	probably
South Africa	functional design	10 years	No	No
Spain	utility model	10 years	Yes	Yes
Taiwan	utility model	10 years	No	Yes
Tajikistan	utility model	9 years	Yes	probably
Tangier International Zone	utility model	10 years	No	unknown
Thailand	petty patent	10 years	Yes	Yes
Tonga	utility model	7 years	No	No
Trinidad and Tobago	utility certificate	10 years	Yes	unknown
Turkey	utility model	10 years	Yes	Yes
Uganda	utility certificate	7 years	No	Yes
Ukraine	utility model	8 years	Yes	Yes
United Arab Emirates	utility model	10 years	Yes	unknown
Uruguay	utility model patent	10 years	No	Yes
Uzbekistan	utility model	8 years	Yes	probably
Venezuela	utility model	10 years	No	Yes
Vietnam	utility model	6 years	Yes	Yes

(†) The members of ARIPO (Lusaka Agreement) are: Botswana, Gambia, Ghana, Kenya, Lesotho, Liberia, Malawi, Mozambique, Namibia, Rwanda, Sierra Leone, Somalia, Sudan, Swaziland, Tanzania, Uganda, Zambia and Zimbabwe.
(*) The Dutch short-term patent is no longer granted since June 5, 2008.
(+) A Malaysian Utility Innovation cannot be filed directly from a PCT, but it can be interconverted from a national phase patent application.
(‡) The members of OAPI are: Benin, Burkina Faso, Cameroon, Central African Republic, Chad, Comoros, Congo, Côte d'Ivoire, Equatorial Guinea, Gabon, Guinea, Guinea-Bissau, Mali, Mauritania, Niger, Senegal and Togo.
(°) No longer possible for PCT-derived applications, with effect from 28/12/2018 [art 46(2) of Minister Regulation No. 38 year 2018], including any pending patent applications at that date.
