= African Regional Intellectual Property Organization =

Intergovernmental organization

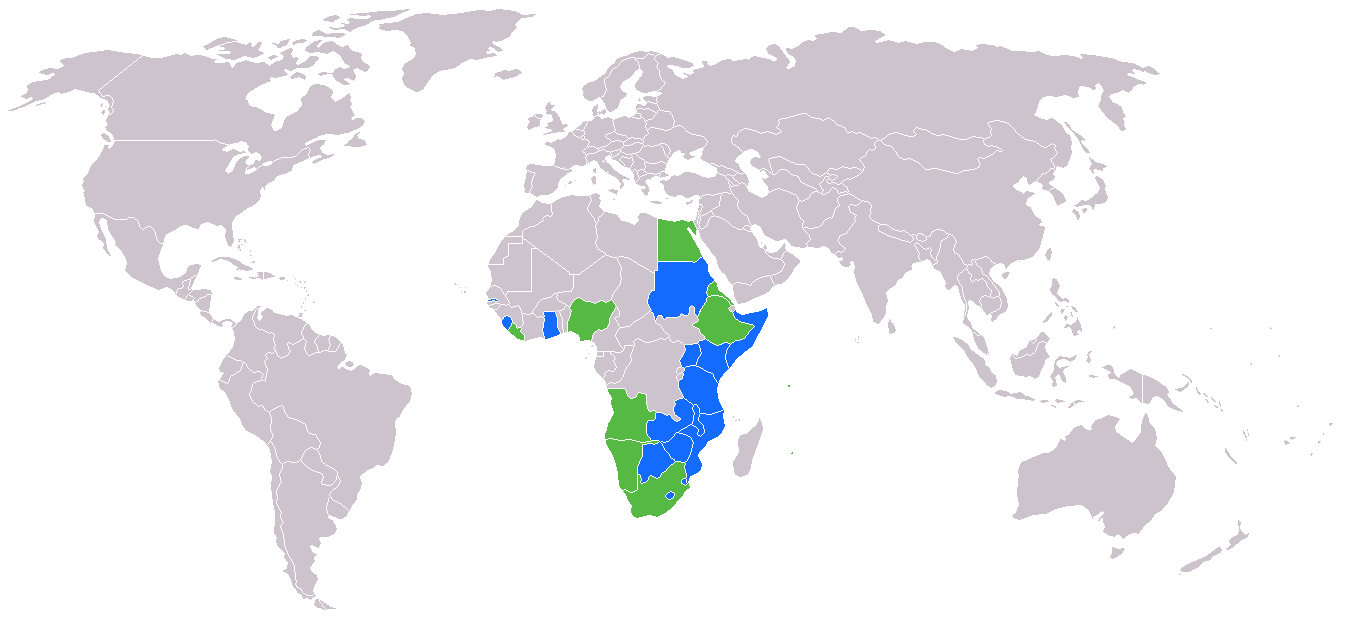
Map of current ARIPO members in blue, nations with observer status in green.

The African Regional Intellectual Property Organization (ARIPO), formerly African Regional Industrial Property Organization, is an intergovernmental organization for cooperation among African states in patent and other intellectual property matters. ARIPO was established by the Lusaka Agreement of 1976. It has the capacity to hear applications for patents and registered trademarks in its member states who are parties to the Harare (patents), Banjul (marks) and Arusha (plant varieties) protocols. ARIPO also features a protocol on the protection of traditional knowledge, the Swakopmund Protocol, signed in 2010 by 9 member states of the organization which entered into force on May 11, 2015, and was amended on December 6, 2016.

ARIPO has the WIPO ST.3 code AP. Its 22 member states are mostly English-speaking countries. Rwanda became the 18th member state on March 24, 2010, and São Tomé and Príncipe on May 19, 2014 (the Harare Protocol entered into force on August 19, 2014, with respect to São Tomé and Príncipe). Seychelles became a member State of ARIPO on 1 January 2022. Mauritius deposited their instrument of accession to the Harare Protocol on May 27, 2025. This means that, effective August 27, 2025, Mauritius will be a designated state in ARIPO applications for patents, utility models, and industrial designs.

The name of the organization changed from African Regional Industrial Property Organization to African Regional Intellectual Property Organization in 2005.

Organization is headquartered in Harare, Zimbabwe.

== History ==
=== Lusaka Agreement ===
At a patents and copyright seminar for English-speaking African countries organised in October 1972 by the World Intellectual Property Organisation (WIPO), the country representatives endorsed a plan to have WIPO and the United Nations Economic Commission for Africa (UNECA) organise a conference to discuss the harmonisation of industrial property legislation and the creation of a central office. The conference, to which 19 English-speaking countries were invited, took place in Addis Ababa, Ethiopia, from 4 to 10 June 1974. During the conference, a draft agreement toward the establishment of an organisation on industrial property for the English-speaking African countries was prepared and several resolutions were passed to facilitate that goal; it was also agreed to eventually hold a diplomatic conference to adopt the draft.

The diplomatic conference to adopt the agreement was subsequently convened by WIPO and UNECA in Lusaka, Zambia, from 6 to 9 December 1976. 13 English-speaking African countries sent delegates. The "Agreement on the Creation of the Industrial Property Organization for English-speaking Africa" (Lusaka Agreement) was adopted on 9 December 1976 with Ghana, Kenya, Mauritius, Somalia, Uganda, and Zambia as original signatories. It entered into force on 15 February 1978. The general purpose of the new regional organisation, known at the time as ESARIPO, was to achieve a higher degree of cooperation in the area of industrial property; this included efforts to work toward the harmonisation and joint development of national industrial property laws. The organisation was originally based in Nairobi, Kenya, until it was decided in 1981 to move the headquarters to Harare, Zimbabwe.

Under the Lusaka Agreement, membership to ESARIPO was originally open to English-speaking African countries (Lusaka Agreement, art IV). The Agreement also provided that the organisation maintain a close working relationship with WIPO and UNECA (art V) and cooperate with other appropriate organisations (art VI) such as OAPI. Early on, ESARIPO was especially focused on harmonisation efforts in the area of patent law. At the Diplomatic Conference in Lusaka, the members requested that until the organisation has established its own secretariat, WIPO and UNECA should "take the necessary preparatory steps for the implementation of the project to establish a patent documentation center in the framework of a regional Office". This process culminated in the adoption of the Harare Protocol on patents on designs in 1982.

== Members ==
Membership and implemented protocols as of 31 December 2020
Country	Date of accession/ratification				
Country	Lusaka Agreement	Harare Protocol	Banjul Protocol	Swakopmund Protocol	Arusha Protocol (not yet in force)
Botswana	6 February 1985	6 May 1985	29 October 2003	28 March 2012	X
Gambia	15 February 1978	16 January 1986	X	11 February 2015	X
Ghana	15 February 1978	25 April 1984	X	X	X
Kenya	15 February 1978	24 October 1984	X	X	X
Lesotho	23 July 1987	23 October 1987	12 February 1999	X	X
Liberia	24 December 2009	24 March 2010	24 March 2010	25 October 2016	X
Malawi	15 February 1978	25 April 1984	6 March 1997	20 December 2012	X
Mozambique	8 February 2000	8 May 2000	15 May 2020	X	X
Namibia	14 October 2003	23 April 2004	14 January 2004	11 February 2015	X
Rwanda	24 June 2011	24 September 2011	X	16 July 2012	7 June 2019
São Tomé and Príncipe	19 May 2014	19 August 2014	27 November 2015	X	29 September 2020
Sierra Leone	5 December 1980	25 February 1999	X	X	X
Somalia	10 December 1981	X	X	X	X
Sudan	2 May 1978	25 April 1984	X	X	X
Swaziland	17 December 1987	17 March 1988	6 March 1997	X	X
Tanzania	12 October 1983	1 September 1999	1 September 1999	X	X
Uganda	8 August 1978	25 April 1984	21 November 2000	X	X
Zambia	15 February 1978	26 February 1986	X	28 August 2015	X
Zimbabwe	11 November 1980	25 April 1984	6 March 1997	22 April 2013	X

(Tanzania does not include Zanzibar, which operates under its own, independent intellectual property regime and maintains a separate office for the registration of intellectual property.)

As of 31 December 2019, five countries have signed the Arusha Protocol of 6 July 2015 (Gambia, Ghana, Mozambique, São Tomé and Príncipe, and Tanzania). As of 31 December 2020, two countries have ratified or acceded to it (Rwanda and São Tomé and Príncipe). For the Protocol to enter into force, four countries need to have deposited their instruments of ratification or accession.

Seychelles became a member State of ARIPO on 1 January 2022.

== Observers ==
1. Algeria
2. Angola
3. Burundi
4. Egypt
5. Eritrea
6. Ethiopia
7. Libya
8. Nigeria
9. South Africa
10. Tunisia

== Organs ==
ARIPO's organisational structure consists of four organs: the Council of Ministers, the Administrative Council, the Secretariat, and the Board of Appeal.

== Rights covered ==
Together, the two protocols constituting the organisation cover copyright, industrial design, patent, trademark, traditional knowledge and utility model rights.

== International cooperation ==
- On 3 October 2019, the ARIPO signed a Memorandum of Understanding with the Eurasian Patent Organization.

== See also ==
- Organisation Africaine de la Propriété Intellectuelle (OAPI)
