= History of patent law =

Legal protection of rights in an invention

The history of patents and patent law is generally considered to have started with the Venetian Statute of 1474.

== Early precedents ==
There is some evidence that some form of patent rights was recognized in Ancient Greece. In 500 BCE, in the Greek city of Sybaris (located in what is now southern Italy), "encouragement was held out to all who should discover any new refinement in luxury, the profits arising from which were secured to the inventor by patent for the space of a year." Athenaeus, writing in the third century CE, cites Phylarchus in saying that in Sybaris exclusive rights were granted for one year to creators of unique culinary dishes.

In England, grants in the form of letters patent were issued by the sovereign to inventors who petitioned and were approved: a grant of 1331 to John Kempe and his company is the earliest authenticated instance of a royal grant made with the avowed purpose of instructing the English in a new industry. These letters patent provided the recipient with a monopoly to produce particular goods or provide particular services. Another early example of such letters patent was a grant by Henry VI in 1449 to John of Utynam, a Flemish man, for a twenty-year monopoly for his invention.

The first extant Italian patent was awarded by the Republic of Venice in 1416 for a device for turning wool into felt. Soon thereafter, the Republic of Florence granted a patent to Filippo Brunelleschi in 1421. Specifically, the well-known Florentine architect received a three-year patent for a barge with hoisting gear, that carried marble along the Arno River.

== Development of the modern patent system ==
Patents were systematically granted in Venice as of 1450, where they issued a decree by which new and inventive devices had to be communicated to the Republic in order to obtain legal protection against potential infringers. The period of protection was 10 years. These were mostly in the field of glass making. As Venetians emigrated, they sought similar patent protection in their new homes. This led to the diffusion of patent systems to other countries.

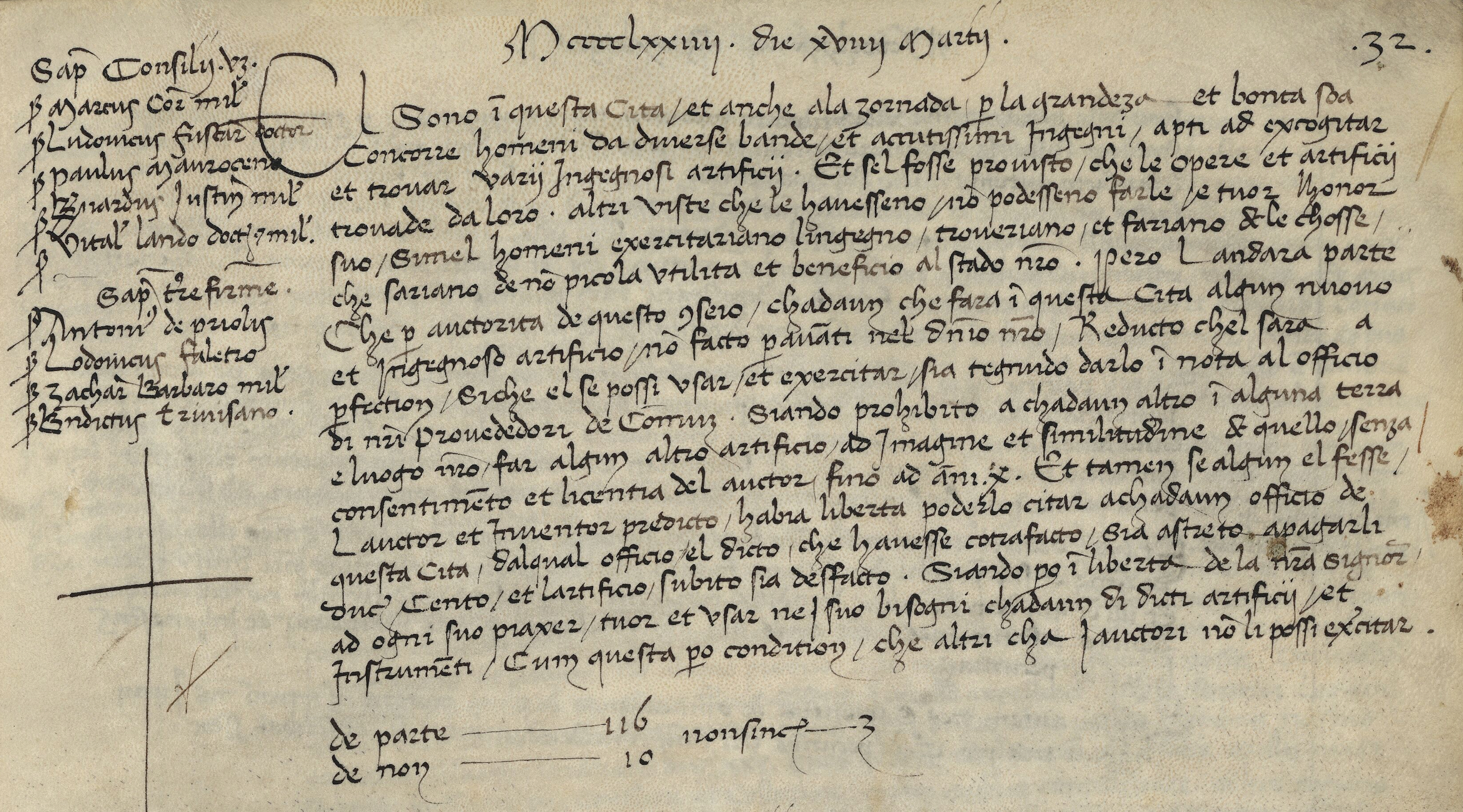
The Venetian Patent Statute, issued by the Senate of Venice in 1474, one of the earliest patent systems in the world

King Henry II of France introduced the concept of publishing the description of an invention in a patent in 1555. The first patent "specification" was to inventor Abel Foullon for "Usaige & Description de l'holmetre", (a type of rangefinder.) Publication was delayed until after the patent expired in 1561. Patents were granted by the monarchy and by other institutions like the "Maison du Roi" and the Parlement of Paris. The novelty of the invention was examined by the French Academy of Sciences. Digests were published irregularly starting in 1729 with delays of up to 60 years. Examinations were generally done in secret with no requirement to publish a description of the invention. Actual use of the invention was deemed adequate disclosure to the public.

The English patent system evolved from its early medieval origins into the first modern patent system that recognised intellectual property in order to stimulate invention; this was the crucial legal foundation upon which the Industrial Revolution could emerge and flourish.

By the 16th century, the English Crown would habitually grant letters patent for monopolies to favoured persons (or people who were prepared to pay for them). Blackstone (same reference) also explains how "letters patent" (Latin literae patentes, "letters that lie open") were so called because the seal hung from the foot of the document: they were addressed "To all to whom these presents shall come" and could be read without breaking the seal, as opposed to "letters close", addressed to a particular person who had to break the seal to read them.

This power was used to raise money for the Crown, and was widely abused, as the Crown granted patents in respect of all sorts of common goods (salt, for example). Consequently, the Court began to limit the circumstances in which they could be granted. After public outcry, James I of England was forced to revoke all existing monopolies and declare that they were only to be used for "projects of new invention". This was incorporated into the 1624 Statute of Monopolies in which Parliament restricted the Crown's power explicitly so that the king could only issue letters patent to the inventors or introducers of original inventions for a fixed number of years. It also voided all existing monopolies and dispensations with the exception of:

...the sole working or making of any manner of new manufactures within this realm to the true and first inventor and inventors of such manufactures which others at the time of making such letters patent and grants shall not use...

The statute became the foundation for later developments in patent law in England and elsewhere. The first patent recorded in England as granted to a woman was in 1637 to Mrs. Amye Everard Ball for a tincture of saffron.

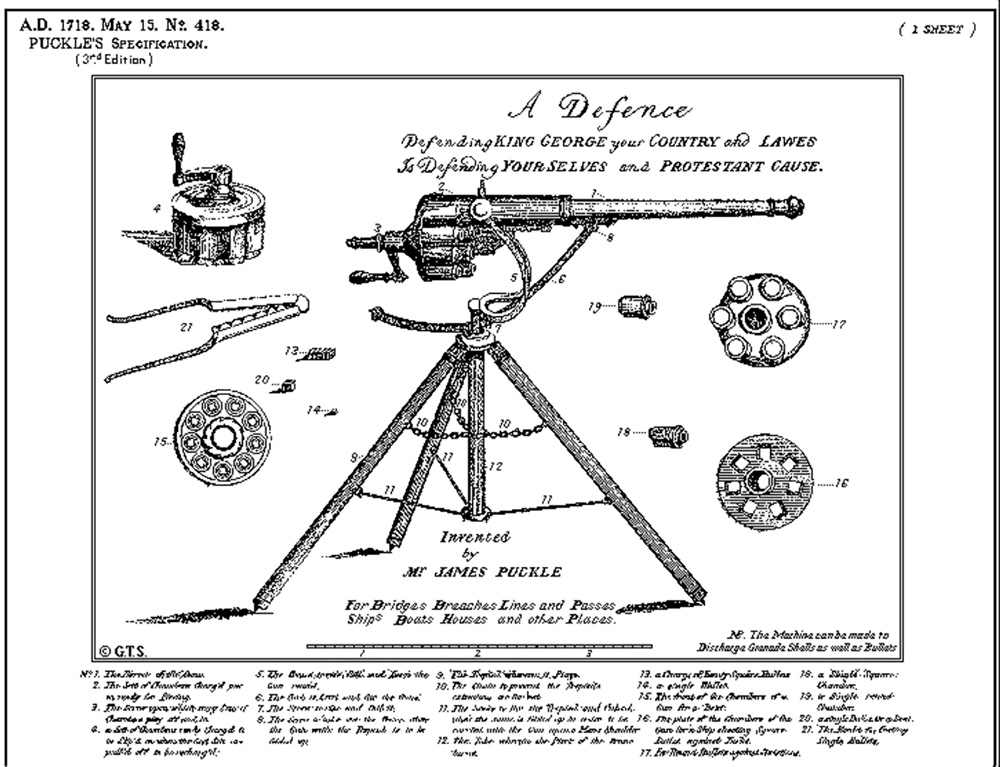
James Puckle's 1718 early autocannon was one of the first inventions required to provide a specification for a patent.

Important developments in patent law emerged during the 18th century through a slow process of judicial interpretation of the law. During the reign of Queen Anne, patent applications were required to supply a complete specification of the principles of operation of the invention for public access. Patenting medicines was particular popular in the mid-eighteenth century and then declined. Legal battles around the 1796 patent taken out by James Watt for his steam engine, established the principles that patents could be issued for improvements of an already existing machine and that ideas or principles without specific practical application could also legally be patented.

This legal system became the foundation for patent law in countries with a common law heritage, including the United States, New Zealand and Australia. In the Thirteen Colonies, inventors could obtain patents through petition to a given colony's legislature. In 1641, Samuel Winslow was granted the first patent in North America by the Massachusetts General Court for a new process for making potash salt.

Towards the end of the 18th century, and influenced by the philosophy of John Locke, the granting of patents began to be viewed as a form of intellectual property right, rather than simply the obtaining of economic privilege. A negative aspect of the patent law also emerged in this period – the abuse of patent privilege to monopolise the market and prevent improvement from other inventors. A notable example of this was the behaviour of Boulton & Watt in hounding their competitors such as Richard Trevithick through the courts, and preventing their improvements to the steam engine from being realised until their patent expired.

== Eighteenth century ==
Richard Arkwright obtained a "Grand Patent" covering the spinning frame and other inventions in 1775. Subsequent infringements by mill-owners led him to take legal action to assert his rights. A series of trials began in 1781, and in the last of them (1785), Arkwright's claims as an inventor were called into question, Highs, Kay and Kay's wife Sarah all testifying that Arkwright had stolen High's invention of the rollers "by the medium of Mr Kay". Subsequently it was variously claimed that Arkwright had envisaged the design before meeting Kay, that Kay had stolen High's ideas, or that Kay conceived the machine as well as building it.

The case did not settle the question of authorship, but was notable for clarifications of patent law in the instructions given by the judge to the jury: they must find the patent null, regardless of authorship, if they considered it insufficiently novel, or if Arkwright had failed to adequately specify the technology in the patent documents. Presumably on these grounds, the jury set aside the patents—a loss for Arkwright, as well as for Highs and Kay.

== Consolidation ==
The modern French patent system was created during the Revolution in 1791. Patents were granted without examination since inventor's right was considered as a natural one. Patent costs were very high (from 500 to 1500 francs). Importation patents protected new devices coming from foreign countries. The patent law was revised in 1844 – patent cost was lowered and importation patents were abolished. The revision saw the introduction of the Breveté SGDG, which excluded any guarantees that the patented item would actually satisfy its specification.

First ever U.S. patent, granted to Samuel Hopkins in 1790

The Patent and Copyright Clause of the United States Constitution was proposed in 1787 by James Madison and Charles Cotesworth Pinckney. In Federalist No. 43, Madison wrote, "The utility of the clause will scarcely be questioned. The copyright of authors has been solemnly adjudged, in Great Britain, to be a right of common law. The right to useful inventions seems with equal reason to belong to the inventors. The public good fully coincides in both cases with the claims of the individuals."

The first Patent Act of the U.S. Congress was passed on April 10, 1790, titled "An Act to promote the progress of useful Arts." The first patent was granted on July 31, 1790 to Samuel Hopkins for a method of producing potash (potassium carbonate).

The earliest law required that a working model of each invention be submitted with the application. Patent applications were examined to determine if an inventor was entitled to the grant of a patent. The requirement for a working model was eventually dropped. In 1793, the law was revised so that patents were granted automatically upon submission of the description. A separate Patent Office was created in 1802.

The patent laws were again revised in 1836, and the examination of patent applications was reinstituted. In 1870 Congress passed a law which mainly reorganized and reenacted existing law, but also made some important changes, such as giving the commissioner of patents the authority to draft rules and regulations for the Patent Office.

By the end of the 19th century, codified patent laws were enacted in several Western countries, including England (1718), the United States (1790), France (1791), Russia (1814), and Germany (1877), as well as in India (1859) and in Japan (1885). Also, in order to allow the inventors to patent their inventions in foreign countries the Paris Convention for the Protection of Industrial Property was signed in 1883.

After the Paris Convention there was relatively little development in the international patent law and practice until the signing of Patent Cooperation Treaty in 1970. Compared to the Paris Convention of 1883, the Patent Cooperation Treaty further facilitated the process of obtaining patents for the same invention in different countries by extending the international filing window from 12 to 30 months, introducing unified criteria for patentability of an invention, and providing for a mandatory "international search" and for an optional more detailed examination called "written opinion". Neither the "international search" nor the "written opinion" are binding on (or reduce the patent prosecution cost at) the national patent authorities, which issue the legally enforceable patents.

== Criticism ==
Under the influence of the ascendant economic philosophy of free trade economics in England, the patent law began to be criticised in the 1850s as obstructing research and benefiting the few at the expense of public good. The campaign against patenting expanded to target copyright too and, in the judgment of historian Adrian Johns, "remains to this day the strongest [campaign] ever undertaken against intellectual property", coming close to abolishing patents.

Its most prominent activists – Isambard Kingdom Brunel, William Robert Grove, William Armstrong and Robert A. MacFie – were inventors and entrepreneurs, and it was also supported by radical laissez-faire economists (The Economist published anti-patent views), law scholars, scientists (who were concerned that patents were obstructing research) and manufacturers. Johns summarizes some of their main arguments as follows:

[Patents] projected an artificial idol of the single inventor, radically denigrated the role of the intellectual commons, and blocked a path to this commons for other citizens – citizens who were all, on this account, potential inventors too. [...] Patentees were the equivalent of squatters on public land – or better, of uncouth market traders who planted their barrows in the middle of the highway and barred the way of the people.

Similar debates took place during that time in other European countries such as France, Prussia, Switzerland and the Netherlands. Based on the criticism of patents as state-granted monopolies inconsistent with free trade, the Netherlands abolished patents in 1869 (having established them in 1817), and did not reintroduce them until 1912. In Switzerland, criticism of patents delayed the introduction of patent laws until 1907.

In England, despite much public debate, the system was not abolished – it was reformed with the Patent Law Amendment Act of 1852. This simplified procedure for obtaining patents, reduced fees and created one office for the entire United Kingdom, instead of different systems for England and Wales and Scotland. In France as well, a similar controversy erupted in the 1860s and reforms were made.

There is also criticism regarding the prevalent gender gap in patents. Although historical laws that precluded women from obtaining patents are no longer in force, the number of women patent holders is still significantly disproportionate in comparison to their male counterparts.

== See also ==
- History of copyright law
- History of United States patent law
- United States patent case law
- Scire facias

== Sources ==
- Bugbee, Bruce W. (1967). Genesis of American Patent and Copyright Law. Washington, D.C.: Public Affairs Press.
- Dobyns, Kenneth W. (1994). The Patent Office Pony: A History of the Early Patent Office. Sergeant Kirkland's Press.
- Espinasse, F. (2010) [1874]. "John Kay and James Hargreaves". Lancashire worthies. Vol. 2. Ballantyne. ISBN 978-1-146-87257-7. OCLC 10973235.
- Galvez-Behar, G. (2008). La République des inventeurs. Propriété et organisation de l'innovation en France (in French). Presses universitaires de Rennes.
- MacLeod, Christine (1988). Inventing the Industrial Revolution: The English patent system, 1660–1800. Cambridge University Press. ISBN 0-521-30104-1.
- Rockman, Howard B. (2004). Intellectual Property law for Engineers and Scientists. Wiley - IEEE Press. ISBN 978-047144998-0.
