= Reinventing the wheel =

Idiomatic expression, meaning to waste effort on something that has already been achieved

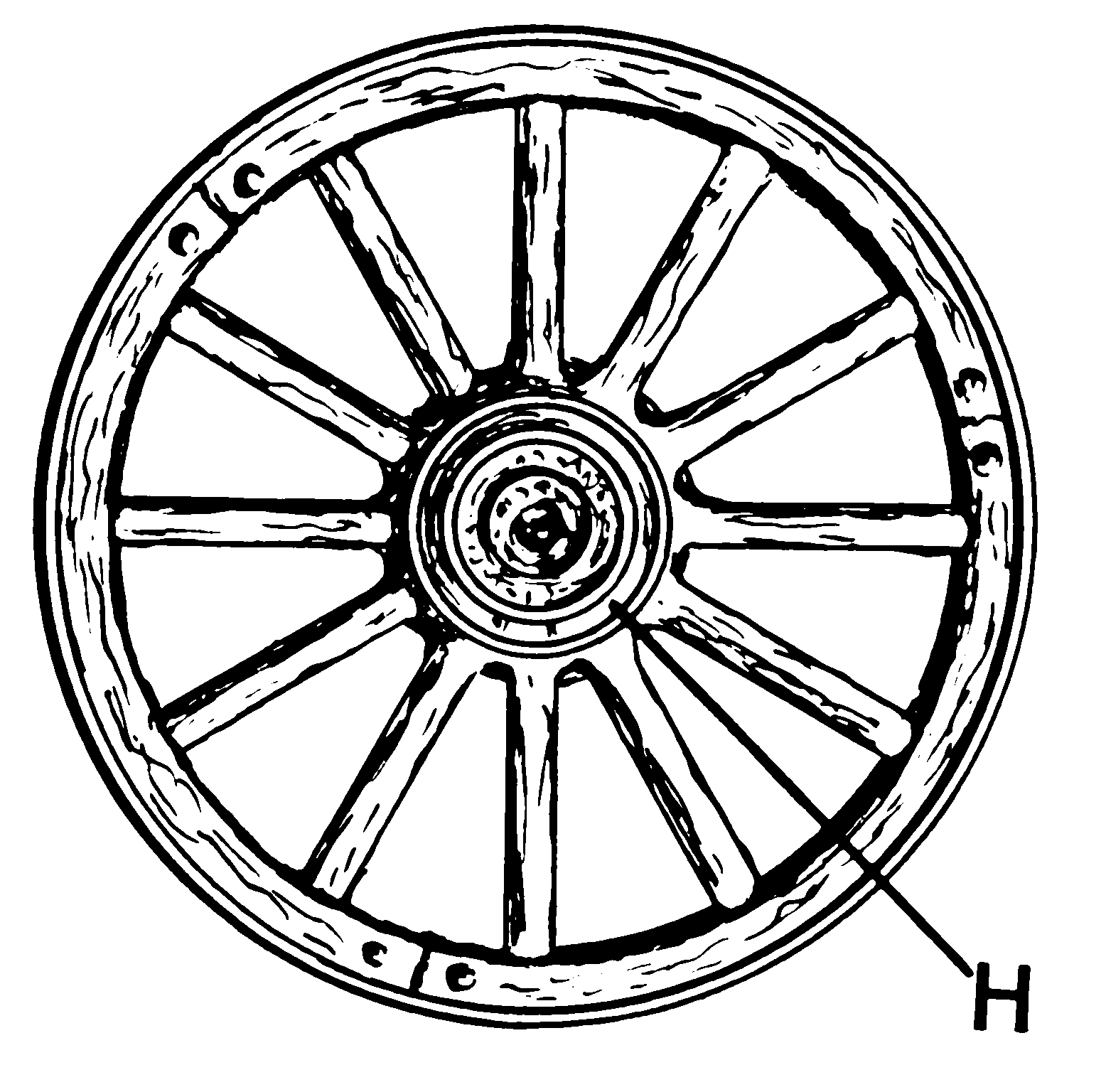
Since the wheel (H) works as expected and it needs no further improvement, to reinvent it would likely be a waste of time and effort.

To reinvent the wheel is to attempt to duplicate—most likely with inferior results—a basic method that has already previously been created or optimized by others. The inspiration for this idiomatic metaphor is that the wheel is an ancient archetype of human ingenuity (one so profound that it continues to underlie much of modern technology). As it has already been invented and is not considered to have any inherent flaws, an attempt to reinvent it would add no value to it and be a waste of time, diverting the investigator's resources from possibly more worthy goals.

== Usage ==
The phrase is sometimes used without derision when a person's activities might be perceived as merely reinventing the wheel when they actually possess additional value. For example, "reinventing the wheel" is an important tool in the instruction of complex ideas. Rather than providing students simply with a list of known facts and techniques and expecting them to incorporate these ideas perfectly and rapidly, the instructor instead will build up the material anew, leaving the student to work out those key steps which embody the reasoning characteristic of the field.

"Reinventing the wheel" may be an ironic cliche – it is not clear when the wheel itself was actually invented. The modern "invention" of the wheel might actually be a "re-invention" of an age-old invention. Additionally, many different wheels featuring enhancements on existing wheels (such as the many types of available tires) are regularly developed and marketed. The metaphor emphasizes understanding existing solutions, but not necessarily settling for them.

== In software development ==
In software development, reinventing the wheel is often necessary in order to work around software licensing incompatibilities or around technical and policy limitations present in parts or modules provided by third parties. An example would be to implement a quicksort for a script written in JavaScript and destined to be embedded in a web page. The quicksort algorithm is well known and readily available from libraries for software developers writing general-purpose applications in C++ or Java, but some JavaScript implementations do not provide this specific algorithm. Hence, if a developer wants to reliably use quicksort on their web page, they must "reinvent the wheel" by reimplementing the algorithm. They could conceivably copy it from another web page, but then they could run into copyright and software licensing issues. Reinventing the wheel in this case provides the missing functionality and also avoids copyright issues.

Additionally, those new to a language (and especially those new to programming) will often attempt to manually write many functions for which a more robust and optimized equivalent already exists in the standard library or other easily available libraries. While this can be useful as a learning exercise, when done unknowingly the result is often less readable, less reliable, less tested and less optimized software which takes longer to write, test, maintain, and debug.

== Software projects that are reinvented wheels ==
- FreeDOS, a replica of MS-DOS
- FreeWin95, a replica of Windows 95
- ReactOS, a replica of Windows NT
- Apache Harmony, a replica of Java SE 5 and Java SE 6
- ruffle, a replica of Flash Player
- LAME, whose name is short for "LAME Ain't an MP3 Encoder", despite the fact that it is one.

== Related phrases ==
Reinventing the square wheel is the practice of unnecessarily engineering artifacts that provide functionality already provided by existing standard artifacts (reinventing the wheel) and ending up with a worse result than the standard (a square wheel). This is an anti-pattern which occurs when the engineer is unaware or contemptuous of the standard solution or does not understand the problem or the standard solution sufficiently to avoid problems overcome by the standard. It is mostly an affliction of inexperienced engineers, or the second-system effect.

Many problems contain subtleties that were resolved long ago in mainstream engineering (such as the importance of a wheel's rim being smooth). Anyone starting from scratch, ignoring the prior art, will naturally face these problems afresh, and to produce a satisfactory result they will have to spend time developing solutions for them (most likely the same solutions that are already well known). However, when reinventing the wheel is undertaken as a subtask of a bigger engineering project, rather than as a project in its own right hoping to produce a better wheel, the engineer often does not anticipate spending much time on it. The result is that an underdeveloped, poorly performing version of the wheel is used, when using a standard wheel would have been quicker and easier, and would have given better results.

Preinventing the wheel involves delaying a task if it is expected to be undertaken later. An example would be, "We don't want to preinvent the wheel" when discussing a solution to a problem when it is known that the solution is being developed elsewhere. It is not necessarily pejorative.

Redefining the wheel is the practice of coming up with new and often abstruse ways of describing things when the existing way of describing them was perfectly adequate.

== See also ==
- Anti-pattern
- Best practice
- Design around: an alternative invention that is created in order to avoid patent infringement
- Not invented here
- Patent thicket
- Standing on the shoulders of giants, an expression referring to the re-use of existing ideas
- Stovepipe system
- Tragedy of the anticommons
