= Lizard Lighthouse =

Lighthouse on the south coast of Cornwall, England

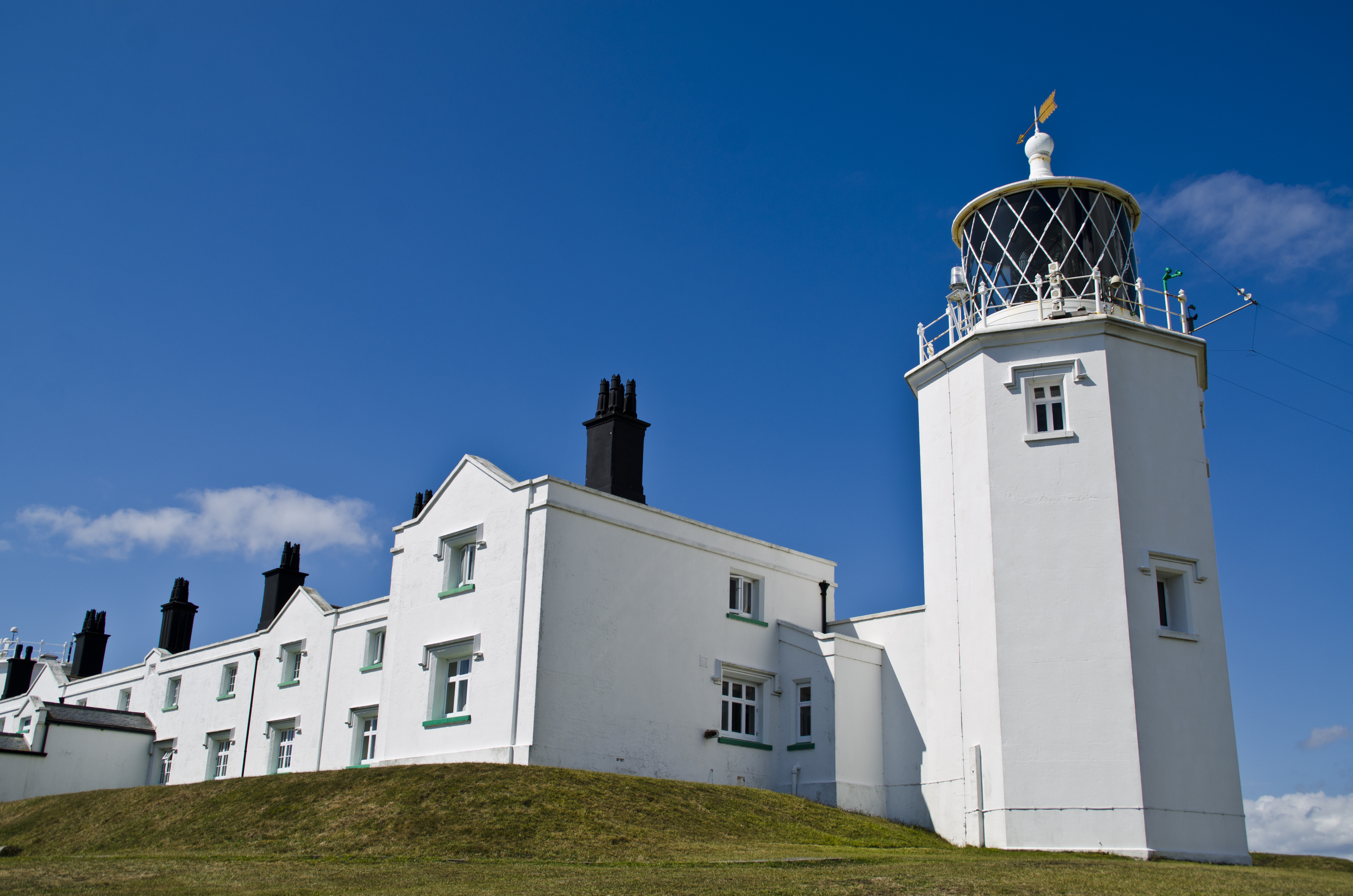
- Lizard Lighthouse
- Location: Lizard Point, Cornwall, England
- OS grid: SW7040511578
- Coordinates: 49°57′37″N 5°12′8″W

Tower
- Constructed: 1619 (first)
- Construction: stone tower
- Automated: 1998
- Height: 19 m (62 ft)
- Shape: twin octagonal towers with balcony and lantern connected by keeper's quarter
- Markings: white tower and lantern
- Operator: Trinity House
- Heritage: Grade II listed building

Light
- First lit: 1751 (current)
- Deactivated: 1903 (West tower)
- Focal height: 70 m (230 ft)
- Lens: 2nd order Catadioptric four-panel rotating lens
- Intensity: 800,000 candela
- Range: 26 nmi (48 km)
- Characteristic: Fl W 3s.

Listed Building – Grade II
- Official name: Lizard lighthouse
- Designated: 9 October 1984
- Reference no.: 1328497

The Lizard Lighthouse (Cornish: Golowji Lysardh) is a lighthouse at Lizard Point, Cornwall, England, built to guide vessels passing through the English Channel. It was often the welcoming beacon to persons returning to England, where on a clear night, the reflected light could be seen 100 mi (160 km) away.

== History ==
A light was first exhibited here in 1619, built thanks to the efforts of Sir John Killigrew, but it was extinguished and the tower demolished in 1630 because of difficulties in raising funds for its operation and maintenance.

The current lighthouse, consisting of two towers with cottages between them, was built in 1751 by the landowner Thomas Fonnereau; each tower was topped by a coal-fired brazier. Trinity House took responsibility for the installation in 1771. In 1812 the coal burners on each tower were replaced with Argand lamps and reflectors. In each tower a fixed arrangement of nineteen lamps and reflectors was installed. In 1873 the original lamps and reflectors were still in use. That year, because of the number of wrecks still occurring around the Point, the decision was taken to upgrade the lights and provide a fog signal.

Therefore, in 1874, the site was significantly changed by the building of an engine room to provide electric power, not only for the lights but also for a fog siren. The engine room was equipped with three 10 hp caloric engines by A & F Brown of New York, driving six Siemens dynamo-electric machines, which in turn powered an arc lamp in each tower; (caloric engines were used because there was no nearby source of fresh water for steam power). At the same time a pair of medium-sized (third-order) fixed catadioptric optics were installed, one on each tower, designed by John Hopkinson of Chance Brothers. The siren was in use from January 1878; it sounded (one blast every five minutes) through a 15-foot (4.6 m) horizontal horn which was installed on the roof of the engine house and could be moved depending on the prevailing wind direction. The new electric lights were first lit on 29 March that same year. In 1885 the Siemens dynamos were replaced by a pair of more powerful de Méritens magneto-electric generators.

In 1903 there were further changes when the lantern and light on the western tower were removed, and a large four-panel rotating optic (designed by Thomas Matthews and manufactured by Chance Brothers) was installed in the eastern tower; it was announced that this 'new revolving light of very great power' would be 'visible at a distance of between 40 and 50 miles'. In 1908 a new pair of sirens were installed (sounding out to sea through twin 'trumpets' on the roof of the engine house) and a trio of Hornsby oil engines replaced the caloric engines . Soon afterwards an underwater bell was set up two miles south of the Lizard, operated by an electric striker controlled from the lighthouse via a submarine cable.

A carbon arc lamp continued to provide the light source until it was superseded in 1926 by an electric filament lamp, which enabled a reduction in the number of personnel at the lighthouse from five to three. The new lighting system, designed and installed by the General Electric Company, functioned automatically: a lamp changer was provided which would switch to a reserve electric or emergency acetylene lamp in the event of a bulb or power failure; and an automatic winding device was fitted to the clockwork mechanism that rotated the lenses. Transformers were introduced in the engine room to allow the 40-year-old magnetos to remain in use, along with the Hornsby engines.

The engines and magneto generators continued in daily use until 1950, when the lighthouse was connected to mains electricity. In that year four Gardner diesel engines were installed, three to run compressors for the fog signal, the other linked to a pair of generators for use in the event of a mains power failure. In March 1954 the lighthouse keeper and assistants were able to put out a fire that was started in the exhaust pits of the engines providing the electric power. The clockwork drive, used to rotate the optic, was replaced with an electric motor in 1972.

In 1998, Lizard Lighthouse was automated and demanned. The fog horn was decommissioned in 1998 and replaced with an automatic electronic fog signal; at the time it was the last compressed-air fog signal still in use in the United Kingdom. As of 2022 the rotating optic continues in use for the light.

== Lighthouse Heritage Centre ==
Opened in 2009 with a grant from the Heritage Lottery Fund, the Lizard Lighthouse Heritage Centre is located in the lighthouse engine room, which still features some of the original engines. Interactive exhibits and displays focus on the history of the lighthouse, the life of a lighthouse keeper, and the role of lighthouses in sea safety. Currently, the buildings around the site are being used as holiday cottages. As of 2023, the heritage centre was closed 'with no signs of it reopening'.

=== Original machinery ===
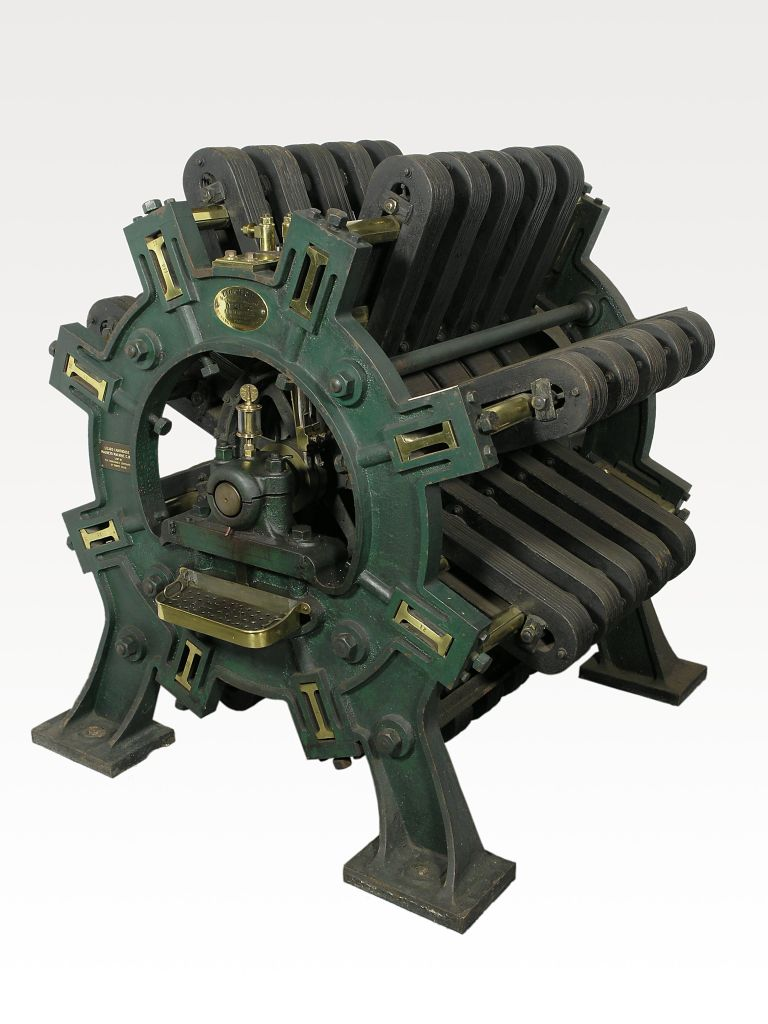
One of the surviving de Méritens magneto-electric generators (now in Birmingham).

One of the lighthouse's old magneto-electric generators is now in the collection of Thinktank, Birmingham Science Museum. The other is still in situ in the engine house; it carries a plate marked:

L'ÉLECTRICITÉ
MÉDAILLE D'OR
Exposition d'Électricité Paris 1881
No. 3 L
A de MÉRITENS, 44 rue Boursault
PARIS
Bté. s.g.d.g. en France & à l'Étranger

The carbon arc lamp, which served as the light source from 1903 to 1926, is also preserved within the lighthouse.

After the compressed-air foghorn was decommissioned its machinery was left in place and it was still occasionally sounded to mark special occasions. Prior to the opening of the Heritage Centre two of the four Gardner engines were removed (one with its attached compressor, the other with its attached generator); they were subsequently acquired by the Internal Fire Museum of Power in Wales. The other two compressor sets remain in place in the engine room.

== Gallery ==
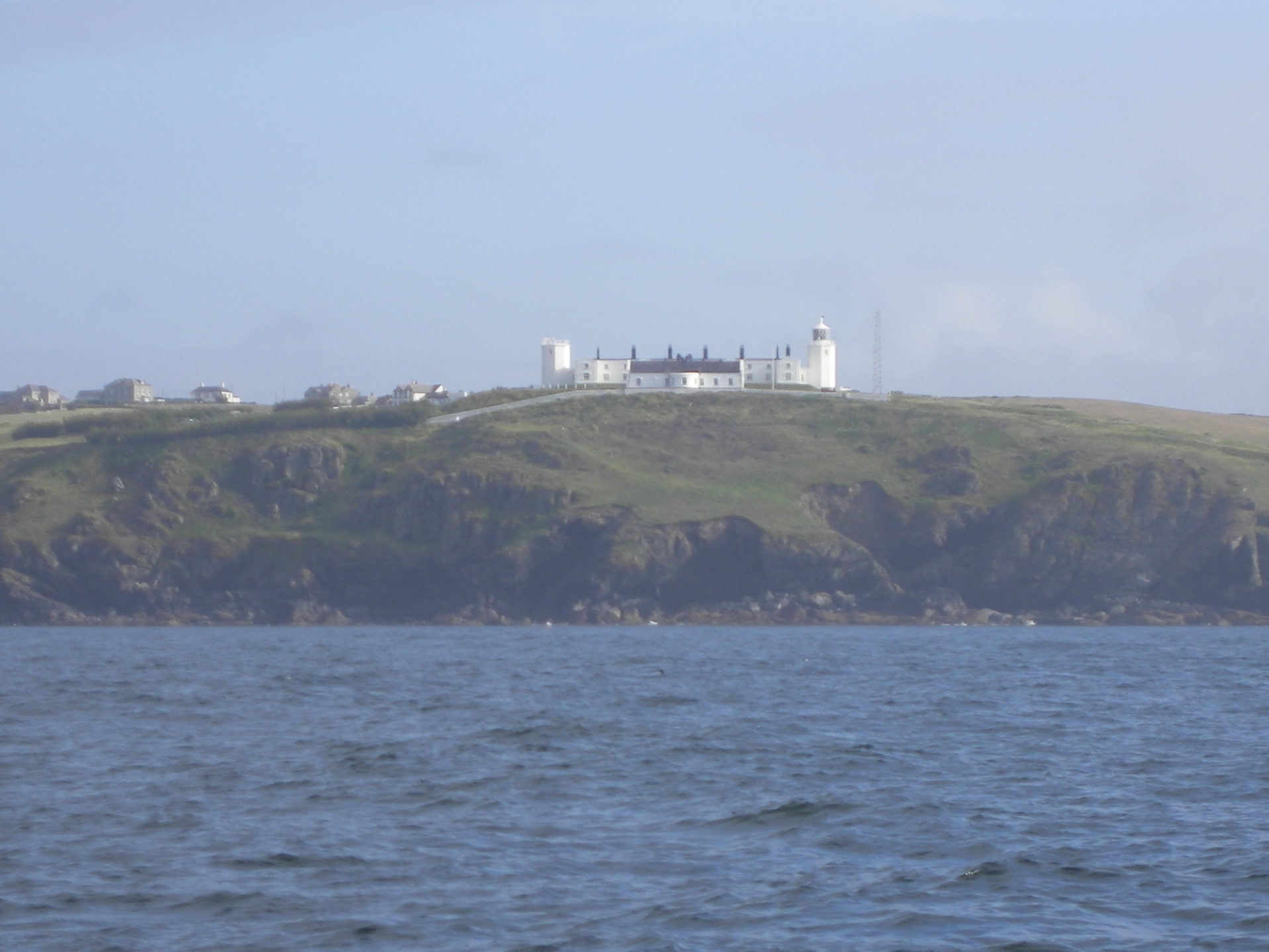
Lizard Lighthouse from sea

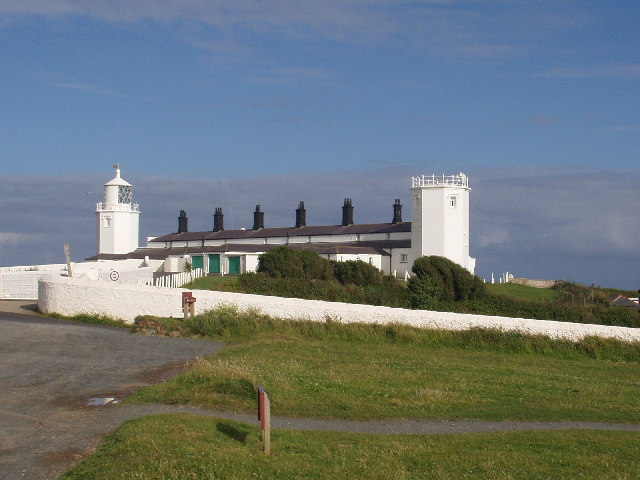
Lizard Lighthouse from land

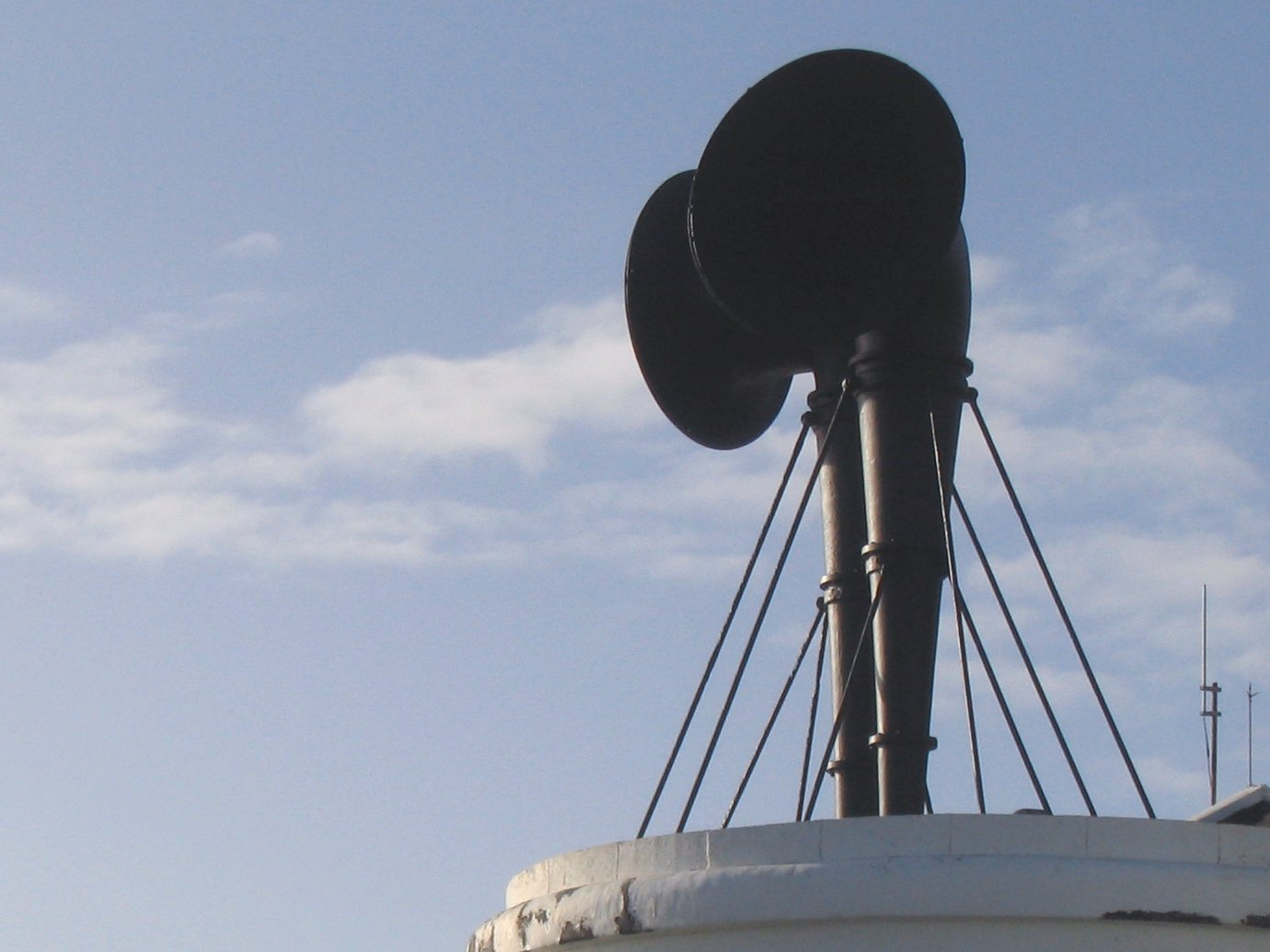
Foghorns at the Lizard lighthouse

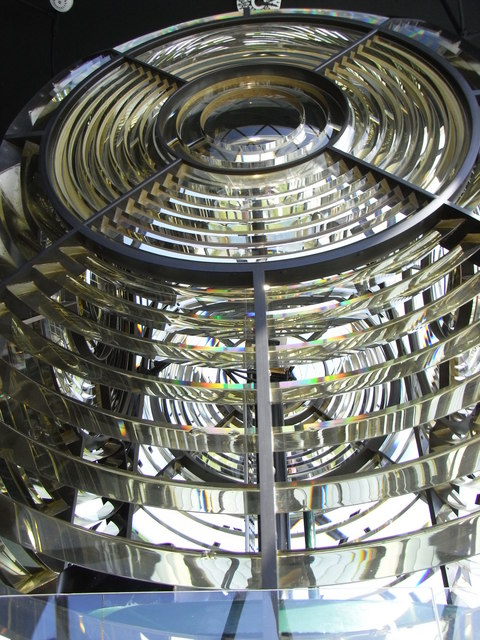
The optic

One of the Gardner diesel compressor sets in the engine room

== See also ==
- List of lighthouses in England
