= Tragedy of the anticommons =

Type of resource coordination breakdown

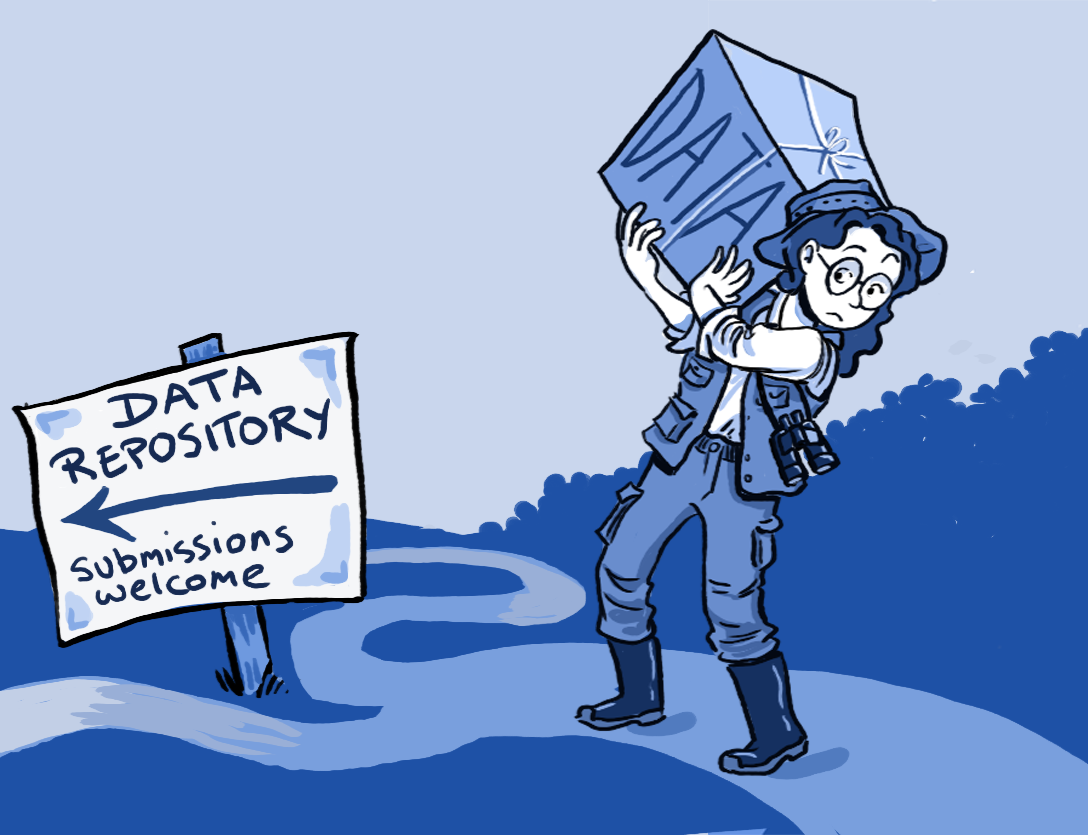
Scientists are often reluctant to share their data.

The tragedy of the anticommons is a type of coordination breakdown, in which a commons does not emerge, even when general access to resources or infrastructure would be a social good. It is a mirror-image of the older concept of tragedy of the commons, in which numerous rights holders' combined use exceeds the capacity of a resource and depletes or destroys it. The "tragedy of the anticommons" covers a range of coordination failures, including patent thickets and submarine patents. Overcoming these breakdowns can be difficult, but there are assorted means, including eminent domain, laches, patent pools, or other licensing organizations.

The two 'tragedies' may be compared as follows:

- The 'tragedy of the commons' occurs when a resource has many users, none of whom own it, and thus none of whom have the ability to exclude others from using it, leading to the over-utilization of that resource.
- The 'tragedy of the anticommons' occurs when a resource has many owners, all of whom have the ability to exclude others from using it, leading to the under-utilization of that resource.

The term originally appeared in Michael Heller's 1998 article of the same name and is the thesis of his 2008 book. The model was formalized by James M. Buchanan and Yong Yoon. In a 1998 Science article, Heller and Rebecca S. Eisenberg, while not disputing the role of patents in general in motivating invention and disclosure, argue that biomedical research was one of several key areas where competing patent rights could actually prevent useful and affordable products from reaching the marketplace.

== Examples ==
In early aviation, the Wright brothers held patents on certain aspects of aircraft, while Glenn Curtiss held patents on ailerons which was an advance on the Wrights' system, but antipathy between the patent holders prevented their use. The government was forced to step in and create a patent pool during World War I.

In his 1998 Harvard Law Review article, Michael Heller noted that there were a lot of open air kiosks but also a lot of empty stores in many Eastern European cities after the fall of communism. Upon investigation, he concluded that it was difficult or even impossible for a startup retailer to negotiate successfully for the use of that space because many different agencies and private parties had rights over the use of store space. Even though all the persons with ownership rights were losing money with the empty stores, and stores were in great demand, competing interests got in the way.

Heller says that the rise of the "robber barons" in medieval Germany was the result of the tragedy of the anticommons. Nobles commonly attempted to collect tolls on stretches of the Rhine passing by or through their fiefs, building towers alongside the river and stretching iron chains to prevent boats from carrying cargo up and down the river without paying a fee. Repeated attempts by the Holy Roman Empire, including several over the centuries by the Emperor, to regulate toll collection on the Rhine failed. And it was not until the establishment of the Rhine League of the Emperor with certain nobles and clergy that the robber barons' control over the Rhine was crushed. River tolls on the Rhine, increasingly imposed by states rather than individual lords, remained a sticking point in relations and commerce in the Rhine basin until the establishment of the Central Commission for Navigation on the Rhine in 1815.

Heller and Rebecca S. Eisenberg are academic law professors who believe that biological patents create a "tragedy of the anticommons", "in which people underuse scarce resources because too many owners can block each other." Others claim that patents have not created this "anticommons" effect on research, based on surveys of scientists.

The housing crisis in many western cities can also be characterized as a tragedy of the anticommons. Zoning and planning processes give neighborhood groups, environmental groups and other stakeholders significant power over whether new housing projects move forward and on what terms. This creates a situation where many stakeholders have the right to exclude others from use of a private resource. In many cases zoning and planning processes make it impossible for private landholders to construct new housing, especially multi-family housing. This results in high prices, reduced inventory and significant homelessness.

The Institute of Medicine highlighted an example of the tragedy of the anticommons in the context of data sharing clinical trial data in the medical field. Some notable challenges included protecting patient privacy, balancing conflicting interests, lack of standardization in data, ensuring data quality and integrity, and legal and regulatory barriers, which all contributed to issues regarding coordination and collaboration down the line. This exemplifies the tragedy of the anticommons because the lower potential efficiency of clinical operation, as well as the satisfaction of patients, is compromised due to an underutilization of clinical data.

The legal battles between Apple Inc. and Samsung can be viewed as an example of the tragedy of the anticommons, specifically in intellectual property rights. Both Apple and Samsung own numerous patents related to mobile devices, and the 10-year long legal dispute has been centred around patent infringement. This situation is a prime example of the tragedy of the anticommons, in the sense where many owners of a resource have the ability to exclude others from using it, leading to the underutilization of that resource. Apple Inc. and Samsung's limitations on their ability to innovate is an overall detriment to them, as well as the common people.

Several patent disputes halted the production of the COVID-19 vaccine during its inception. Some notable cases include Pfizer vs. Moderna, Bharat Biotech vs. Serum Institute of India, and Moderna vs. Arbutus. These three cases are potentially a case of the tragedy of the anticommons. While the COVID-19 vaccine response was relatively quick, this was primarily due to scientists, doctors, ethics approval boards, manufacturers and regulatory agencies moving quickly in the state of emergency. A patent dispute, in the sense of the tragedy of the anticommons, may have slowed down the production process, and limited the technology available, to competing firms. Patent disputes related to the COVID-19 vaccine are complex and often involve multiple parties and legal jurisdictions. The issues involved can be highly technical and may take years to resolve.

== See also ==
- Enclosure
- Free culture movement
- Georgism
- Information silo
- Intellectual property
- Land monopoly
- Natural resource economics
- Network effects
- Rent-seeking
- Rivalry
