= Design around =

Strategy to avoid infringing patents

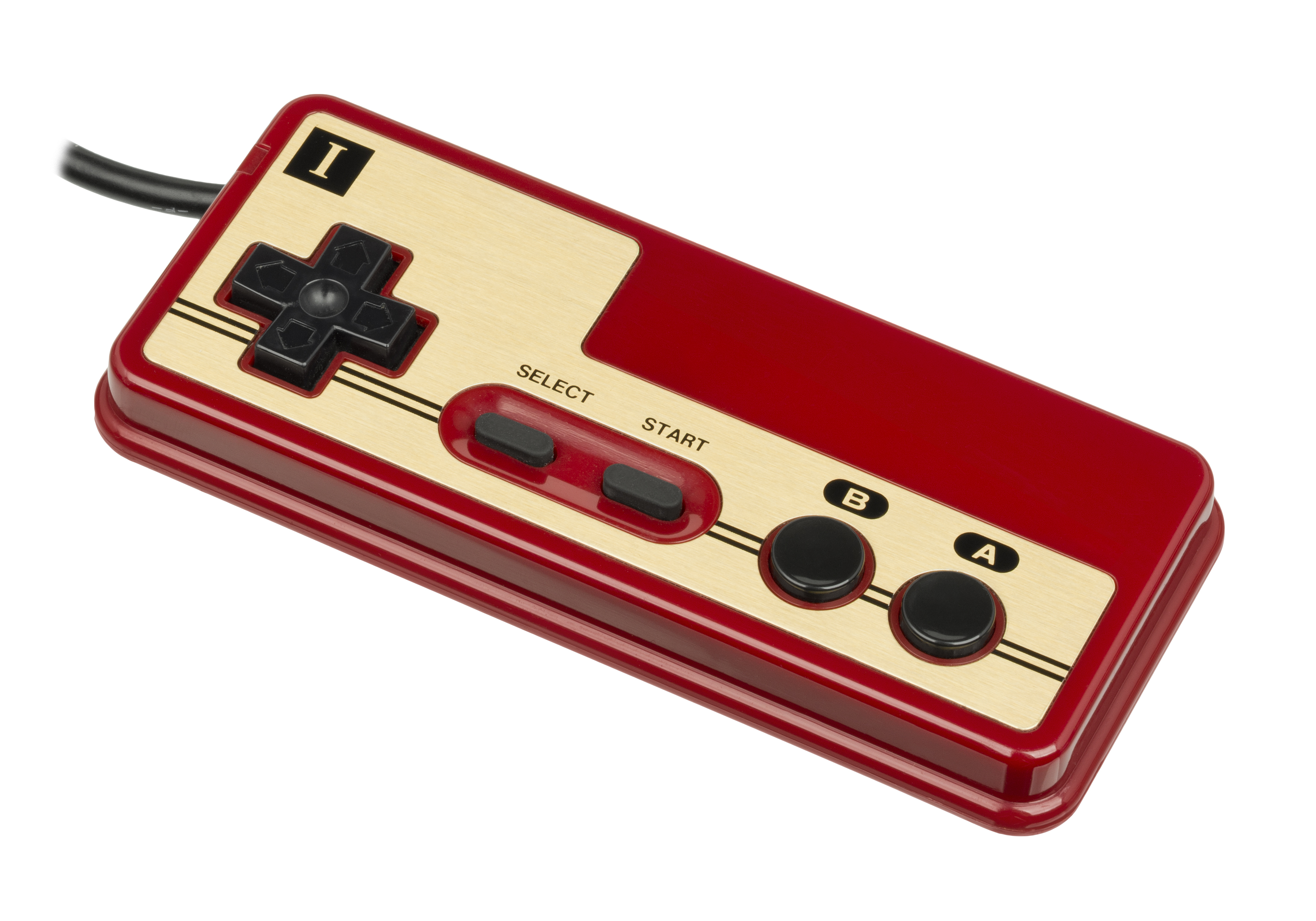
Nintendo Famicom controller, with D-pad on left side

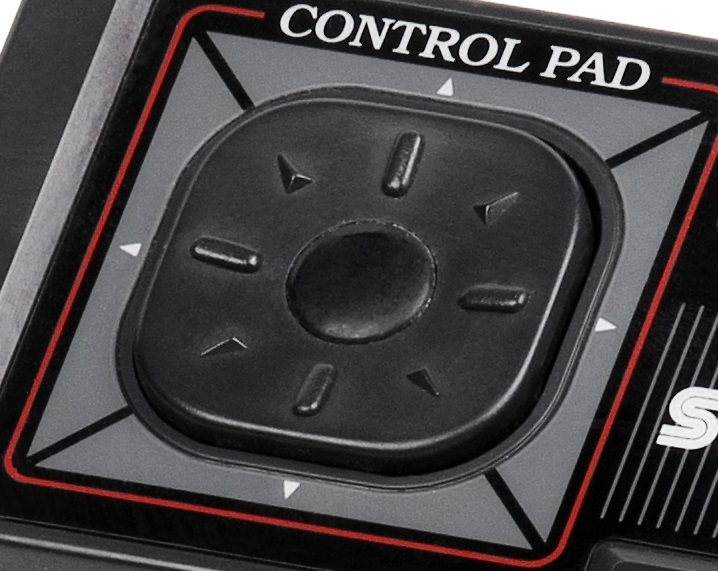
Master System D-pad

Nintendo has a patent on a cross-shaped D-pad, forcing competitors to use circular shaped switches.

In the field of patents, the phrase "to design around" means to design or invent an alternative to a patented invention that does not infringe the patent's claims. The phrase can also refer to the alternative itself.

Design-arounds are considered to be one of the benefits of patent law. By providing monopoly rights to inventors in exchange for disclosing how to make and use their inventions, others are given both the information and incentive to invent competitive alternatives that design around the original patent. In the field of vaccines, for example, design-arounds are considered fairly easy. It is often possible to use the original patent as a guide for developing an alternative that does not infringe the original patent.

Design-arounds can be a defense against patent trolls. The amount of license fee that a patent troll can demand is limited by the alternative of the cost of designing around the troll's patent(s).

In order to defend against design-arounds, inventors often develop a large portfolio of interlocking patents, sometimes called a patent thicket. Thus a competitor will have to avoid many patents when designing.

== See also ==
- Essential patent
- Evergreening
- Patent map
- Reinventing the wheel
- Workaround
