= Rebecca S. Eisenberg =

American lawyer and professor

Academic background
- Education: Stanford University (BA); University of California, Berkeley, School of Law (JD)

Academic work
- Institutions: University of Michigan Law School

Rebecca Sue Eisenberg is an American lawyer and professor. She is a Robert and Barbara Luciano Professor at the University of Michigan Law School.

== Education ==
Eisenberg graduated with a Bachelor of Arts degree from Stanford University and received a J.D. from UC Berkeley School of Law where she also served as an editor of the California Law Review.

== Career ==
Eisenberg began her law career as a clerk for Judge Robert F. Peckham at the United States District Court for the Northern District of California. Eisenberg practiced law in San Francisco, California.

In 1984, Eisenberg joined the faculty at the University of Michigan Law School, where she was subsequently named a Robert and Barbara Luciano Professor. She was one of the first female faculty in Michigan's law school, with Sallyanne Payton and Christina Whitman being hired eight years before her. In 1993, Eisenberg published a journal article titled "The Scholar as Advocate." Her research is focused primarily on patent law and biomedical law. According to Web of Science on 2023-06-15 she has 31 indexed publications and a Hirsch index of 16.

During the 1999–2000 academic year, Eisenberg was a visiting professor of law, science, and technology at Stanford Law School.

== Awards ==
- 2002 Distinguished Service Award. UC Berkeley School of Law.
