= Samuel Winslow (patentee) =

In 1641, Samuel Winslow was granted the first patent in North America by the Massachusetts General Court for a new process for making salt.

== See also ==
- History of patent law
- History of United States patent law
