= Workaround =

Bypass of a recognized problem or limitation in a system

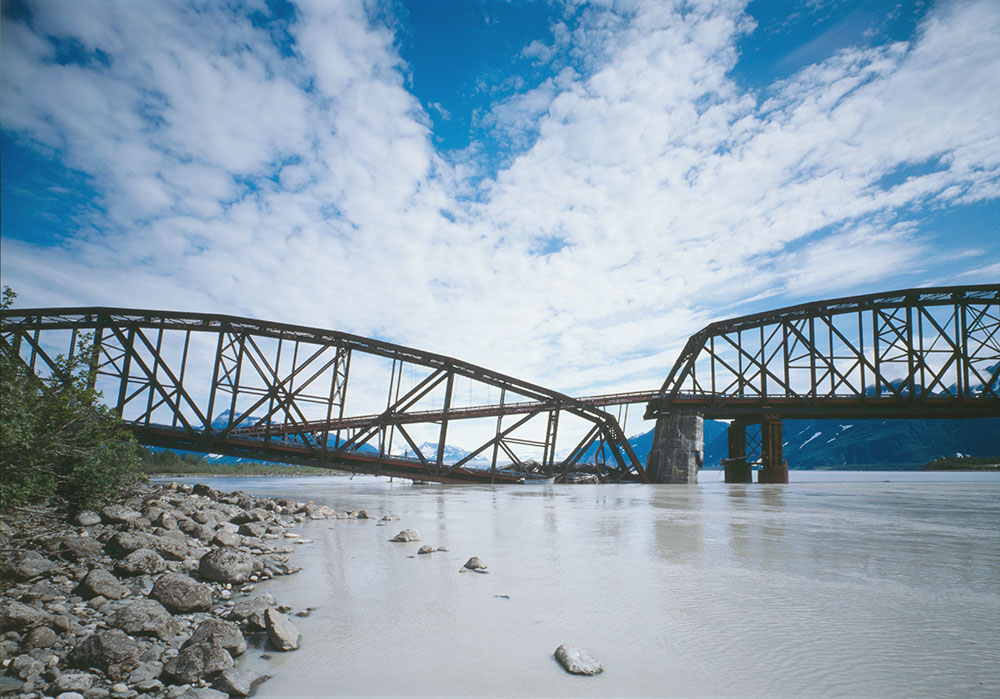
Part of the Miles Glacier Bridge, with a temporary repair after a March 1964 earthquake and was not permanently repaired until July 2004

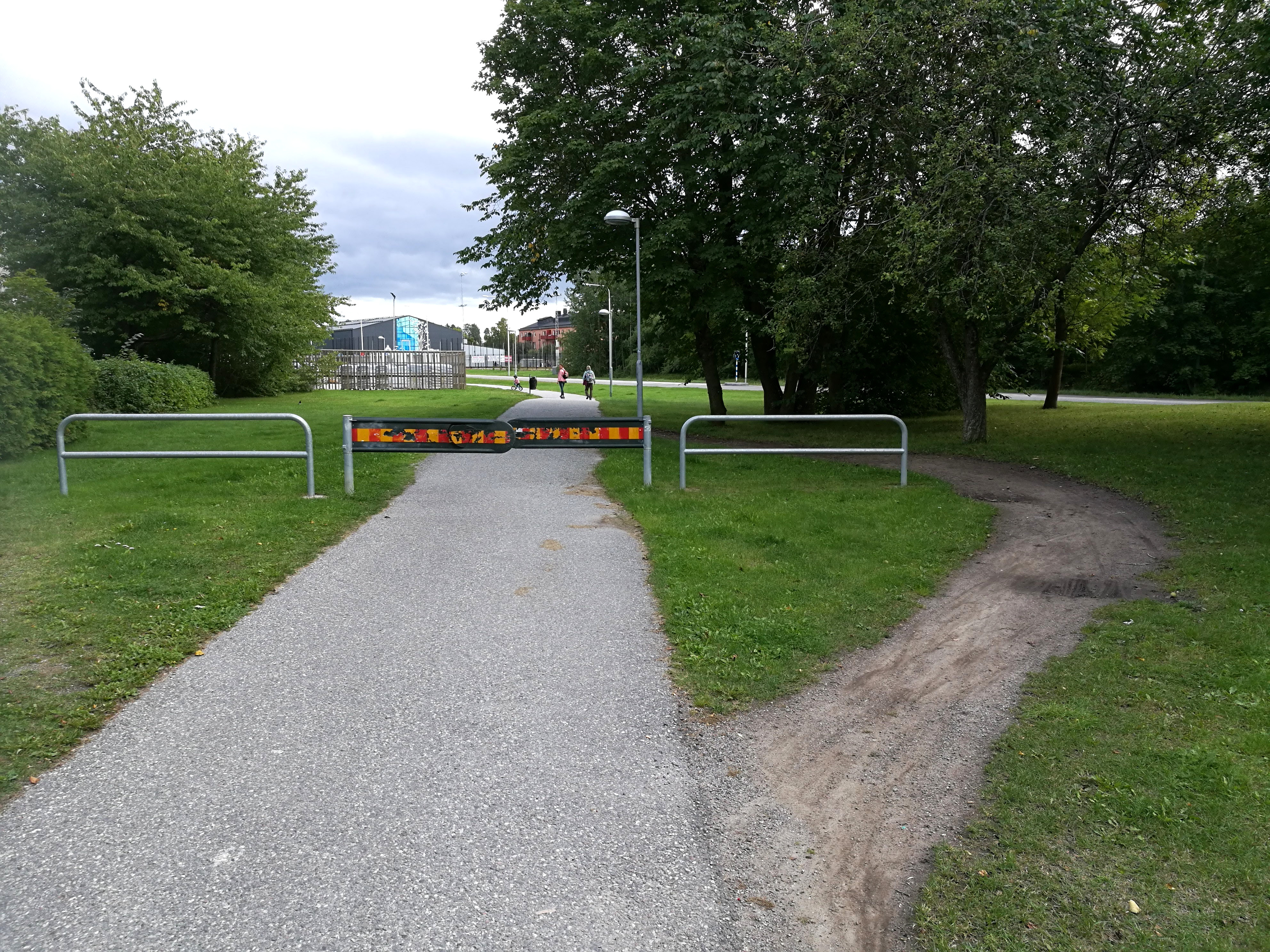
Barriers installed to slow down cyclists have been bypassed by creating a desire path so that they do not have to brake, thus showing a literal example of a workaround and the path of least resistance

A workaround is a bypass of a recognized problem or limitation in a system or policy. A workaround is typically a temporary fix that implies that a genuine solution to the problem is needed. But workarounds are frequently as creative as true solutions, involving outside the box thinking in their creation.

Typically they are considered brittle in that they will not respond well to further pressure from a system beyond the original design. In implementing a workaround, it is important to flag the change so as to later implement a proper solution.

Placing pressure on a workaround may result in later system failures. For example, in computer programming workarounds are often used to address a problem or anti-pattern in a library, such as an incorrect return value. When the library is changed, the workaround may break the overall program functionality, effectively becoming an anti-pattern, since it may expect the older, wrong behaviour from the library.

Workarounds can also be a useful source of ideas for improvement of products or services.

== Legal workarounds ==
When the legal system places an obstacle in the form of a restriction or requirement, the law may provide a possible workaround. Laws intended to tap into what may seem to be deep pockets may lead to what are at least temporary solutions such as:

- Since "most French workplace laws affect businesses with 50 or more employees... many French companies opt to employ only 49 people in avoidance of crippling legislation."
- An injunction against Microsoft regarding XML features and an easy technical workaround, a patent attorney suggested having two versions of MS Word, one with and one without the feature.

=== Acronyms ===
Some well-known acronyms were created to work around bureaucratic or contracting restrictions:

- PDP - The term was used to describe a computer by another name, due to contracting complications for purchasing or leasing computers. The term PDP (Programmed Data Processor or Programmable Data Processor) was a workaround. The name "PDP" intentionally avoids the use of the term "computer". PDPs were aimed at a market that could not afford larger computers.
- GNU - GNU's Not UNIX. As AT&T's prices for academic licensing and use of UNIX increased, new restrictions on maximum number of concurrent users and limitations on types of use created a motivation for an alternative: a work-alike workaround. Among the better known ones are:
  - Linux
  - BSD
  - System V
- PSAP. By contrast with hearing aids, the sale of which is more regulated and more expensive, a Personal Sound Amplification Product (PSAP) is lower in price, albeit more limited in capability.

== See also ==
- Bug
- Coping skill
- Design around, to design or invent an alternative to a patented invention that does not infringe the patent's claims
- Hack
- Jury rig
- Kludge
- Normalization of deviance
- Planned obsolescence
- Preventive maintenance
- Program temporary fix (PTF)
