= Venetian Patent Statute =

Statute of the Republic of Venice

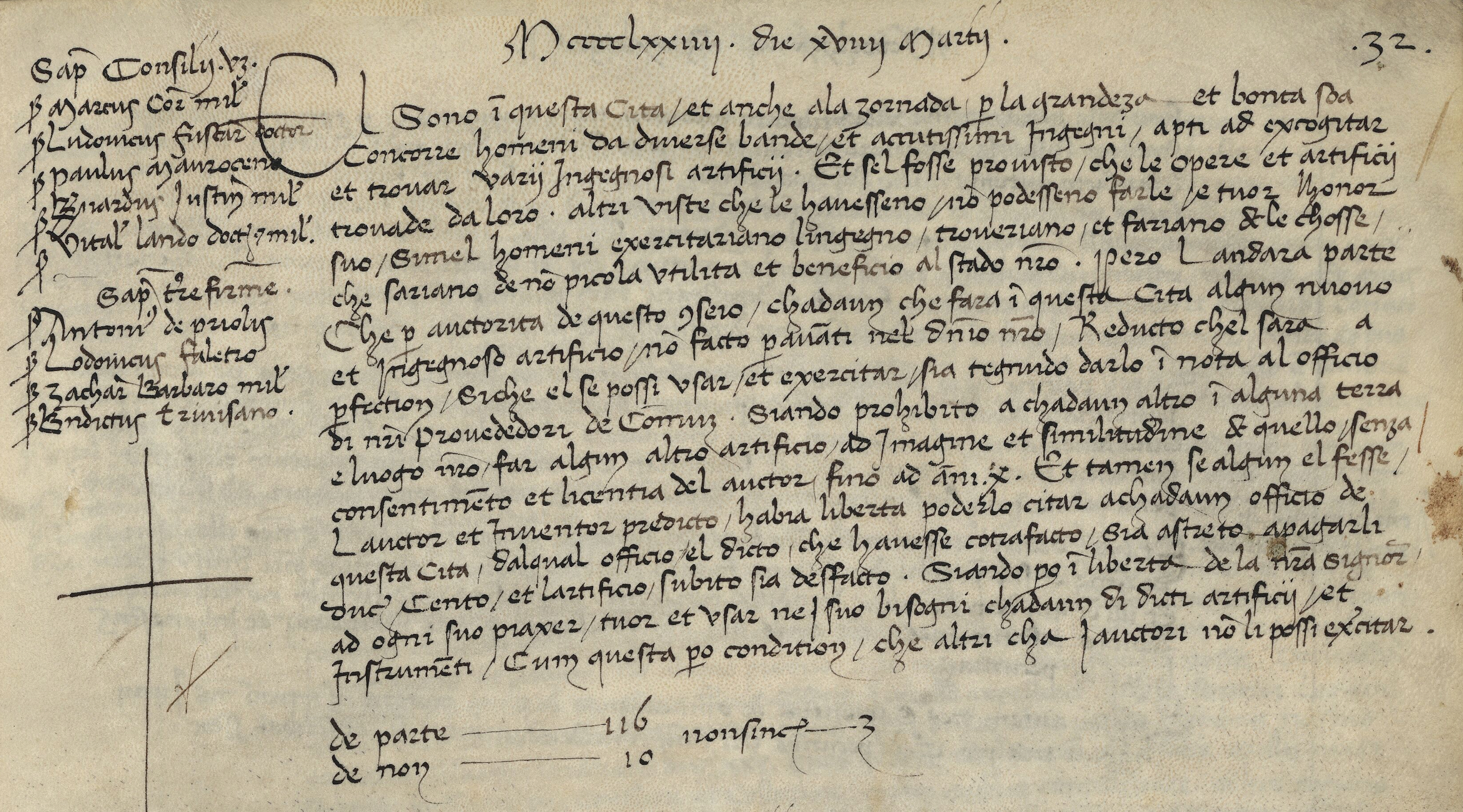
The Venetian Patent Statute, enacted by the Senate of Venice in 1474, is widely accepted to be the basis for the earliest patent system in the world.

The Venetian Patent Statute of March 19, 1474, established in the Republic of Venice the first statutory patent system in Europe, and may be deemed to be the earliest codified patent system in the world. The Statute is written in old Venetian. It provided that patents might be granted for "any new and ingenious device, not previously made", provided it was useful. By and large, these principles still remain the basic principles of patent law.

== Significance ==
The dominant view among historians and legal scholars is that the Venetian Patent Act provides the legal foundation of the modern patent system. Meshbesher observing "the impact of the Venetian patent law and practice on the history of patent law has been studied by several authors and is well-recognized, hence the first patent statute [author's emphasis] is usually considered to be the one was enacted (sic) in the Republic of Venice in 1474".

The most widely accepted translation of the old Venetian dialect original is as follows:

[T]here are in this city, and also there come temporarily by reason of its greatness and goodness, men from different places and most clever minds, capable of devising and inventing all manner of ingenious contrivances. And should it be provided, that the works and contrivances invented by them, others having seen them could not make them and take their honor, men of such kind would exert their minds, invent and make things which would be of no small utility and benefit to our State. Therefore, decision will be passed that, by authority of this Council, each person who will make in this city any new ingenious contrivance, not made heretofore in our dominion, as soon as it is reduced to perfection, so that it can be used and exercised, shall give notice of the same to the office of our Provisioners of Common. It being forbidden to any other in any territory and place of ours to make any other contrivance in the form and resemblance thereof, without the consent and license of the author up to ten years. And, however, should anybody make it, the aforesaid author and inventor will have the liberty to cite him before any office of this city, by which office the aforesaid who shall infringe be forced to pay him the sum of one hundred ducates and the contrivance immediately destroyed. Being then in liberty of our Government at his will to take and use in his need any of the said contrivances and instruments, with this condition, however, that no others than the authors shall exercise them.

One leading patent scholar also stating that "the international patent experience of nearly 500 years has merely brought amendments or improvements upon the solid core established in Renaissance Venice".

Some historians question this dominant view and claim that the Venetian Patent Statute of 1474 "functioned primarily as a codification of prior customs [and] did not introduce new principles. "Neither did it mark the beginnings of the modern patent system." According to Joanna Kostylo, "[i]t should best understood as declaratory instrument codifying existing general principles and customs of granting patent rights for innovations in Venice". Accordingly she states that the significance of the Venetian statute lies "in its broad and general character," in the sense that it attempted to "apply general rules to the granting of patents rather than conferring occasional individual favours (gratiae) in response to individual petitions." It is also significant that the "legislation focuse[d] on protecting and rewarding individual inventors, in contrast to monopolies reserved to organized groups (guilds)."

This alternative view is hard to reconcile with the large shift in patenting activity observed after 1474. As observed by Allan Gomme, former librarian of the UK Patent Office, "there was, then, a regular practice of granting patents in Venice which began about 1475..". See also Statistics, below. The majority view remains that the Venetian Patent Statute marked a watershed moment and was indeed the first basis for a patent system, notwithstanding earlier isolated patents having been issued.

== Statistics ==
Between 1474 and 1788, the Venetian Senate granted about 2000 patents: 28 between 1474 and 1500, 593 between 1500 and 1600, 605 between 1600 and 1700, and 670 between 1700 and 1788. Venetian patents were granted free of payment, "which explains their relatively high number".

== See also ==
- Filippo Brunelleschi, famous Florentine architect and engineer, who claimed ownership over engineering techniques against "corporatist interests and monopoly of the guilds." In 1421, he effectively obtained a patent for a cargo boat. The Republic of Florence granted him a three-year exclusive right on his invention in exchange for disclosing it to the public. The cargo boat sank on its first voyage on the river Arno.
