= Amye Everard Ball =

First woman in England to be granted a patent

Amye Everard Ball was the first woman in England to be granted a patent. Her patent for tincture of saffron was registered in 1637, during the reign of Charles I of England, merely 76 years after Elizabeth I had awarded the very first patent. Mrs. Ball's original patent registration is held at the British Library.

Mrs. Amye Everard Ball was a widow when she registered the patent for a “tincture of saffron, roses &c”. The description explained "The mistery, skill and invention of making, ordering or contribing [sic] of saffron into a manner or forme which shall dissolve into tincture and of divers other vegetables (as of roses, gilliflowers and the like) into an essence, after a newe way by her invented...which shall continue and remaine in full strength and virtue for manie yeares more than saffron in the sheyve or leafe vsually doth or can”.
