= Breveté SGDG =

French patent law

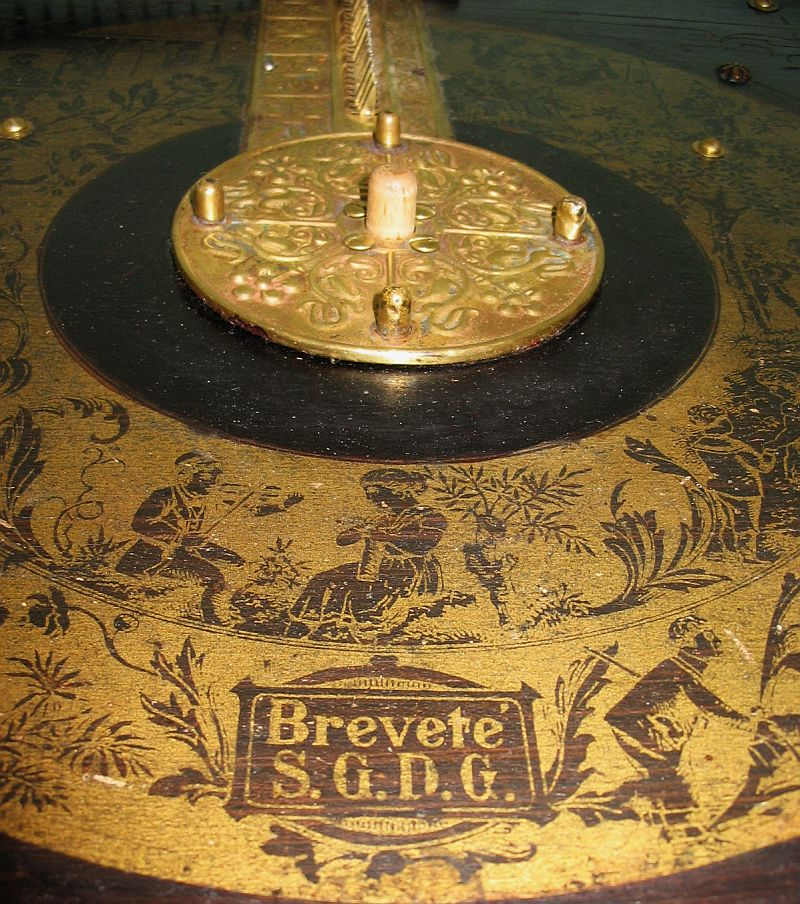
Breveté SGDG on an Ariston music player

Breveté SGDG was a French type of patent that ceased to exist in 1968. The name was a common abbreviation for "Breveté Sans Garantie Du Gouvernement“ (patent without government guarantees).

== Background ==
France and Belgium maintained a system of simple registration of patents. It was believed that patents registered in this way are free from any liability from the government perspective.

In France, the law of 1844 states that patents are issued "without prior examination, at the risk of the applicant and with no guarantee of function, novelty and merit of the invention also in terms of precision or accuracy of the description".

In Belgium, a similar regulation was in place in article 22 of the 1984 Patents Act, and, as of 2019, is still in place.
