= Patent thicket =

Overlapping set of patent rights

A patent thicket is "an overlapping set of patent rights" which requires innovators to reach licensing deals for multiple patents. This concept has negative connotations and has been described as "a dense web of overlapping intellectual property rights that a company must hack its way through in order to actually commercialize new technology".

== Etymology ==
The expression may come from SCM Corp. v. Xerox Corp., 645 F.2d 1195 (2d Cir. 1981), a patent litigation case in the 1970s, wherein SCM's central charge had been that Xerox constructed a "patent thicket" to prevent competition.

== Uses and alternative names ==
Patent thickets are used to defend against competitors designing around a single patent. It has been suggested by some that this is particularly true in fields such as software or pharmaceuticals, but Sir Robin Jacob has pointed out that "every patentee of a major invention is likely to come up with improvements and alleged improvements to his invention" and that "it is in the nature of the patent system itself that [patent thickets] should happen and it has always happened".

Patent thickets are also sometimes called patent floods, or patent clusters. According to a report by Professor Ian Hargreaves, published in May 2011, patent thickets "obstruct entry to some markets and so impede innovation." Patent thickets are said to have become common in fields like nanotechnology as more fundamental science is patented. Some authors have expressed concern that this could reduce technological development and innovation.

== Economic effects ==
The economics of innovation literature suggests that patent thickets may have an ambiguous effect on patent transactions. On one hand, dispersion in the ownership of patents increases the number of patent owners with whom bargains have to be struck, and this may reduce the incentives to conduct patent transactions. But there is a second, countervailing effect: the presence of overlapping patent rights may reduce the value at stake in each individual patent licensing negotiation, and this may facilitate licensing deals.

== Potential antitrust implications in American law ==
Patent thickets also have potential antitrust implications. In In re Humira, 465 F.Supp.3d 811 (N.D. Ill. 2020), a class of third-party payors for Humira argued that pharmaceutical company AbbVie's patent thicket on Humira, consisting of over 100 patents, was in violation of antitrust laws. This patent thicket extended the term of AbbVie's monopoly past the twenty year limit and effectively prevented a generic version of the drug from entering the market keeping prices inflated to upwards of $72,000 a year. The district court ruled that the patents were protected from the allegations by the First Amendment regardless of anti-competitive effect. The case is currently on appeal at the Seventh Circuit.

== See also ==
- Patent ambush
- Patent map
- Patent pool
- Patent portfolio
- Tragedy of the anticommons
