= Recoverable expense =

Commercial real estate operating expense billed back to tenants as additional rent

In commercial real estate, recoverable expenses are operating costs of running a property that a landlord bills back to tenants as a form of additional rent, in addition to base rent. Recoverable expenses are distinguished from non-recoverable expenses — costs that the landlord absorbs as a cost of property ownership and does not pass through to tenants.

The recovery of operating expenses is a fundamental mechanism in commercial leasing that determines the true economic cost of occupancy to tenants and the net income retained by landlords. The structure, scope, and calculation methodology of recoverable expenses are negotiated at lease execution and documented in the lease agreement.

== Recoverable vs. non-recoverable expenses ==
Not all property operating expenses are recoverable. The general principle is that expenses that directly benefit tenants — or are incurred to maintain the property in the condition required by the leases — are recoverable, while expenses that primarily benefit the landlord or relate to the landlord's ownership interest are non-recoverable.

=== Typically recoverable ===
- Electricity, water, and natural gas for common areas and shared building systems
- Common area maintenance (CAM) — cleaning, lighting, landscaping, snow removal, pest control
- Property taxes (subject to expense stop or base year provisions)
- Building insurance premiums — property insurance, liability insurance, and related coverage
- Property management fees
- Security services
- Elevator maintenance and inspection
- Parking lot maintenance and repaving (often subject to amortization)
- Roof repairs and building envelope maintenance (subject to caps)

=== Typically non-recoverable ===
- Leasing commissions and tenant improvement allowances paid to attract new tenants
- Advertising and marketing expenses for vacant space
- Depreciation and amortization of the landlord's basis in the property
- Mortgage debt service — principal and interest on loans secured by the property
- Income tax obligations of the landlord
- Costs of major structural repairs or capital replacements that extend the life of the building (unless specifically permitted and capped)

== Tenant share calculation ==
The calculation of a given tenant's proportionate share of a recoverable expense is based on the tenant's pro rata share of the building's rentable area:

$$\text{Tenant Share} = \frac{\text{Tenant Rentable Area}}{\text{Total Building Rentable Area}} \times \text{Total Recoverable Expense}$$

This formula applies to expenses that are truly shared across the entire building — building-wide utilities, property taxes, and insurance. For expenses that are specific to a subset of the building — such as the higher cleaning costs of a food court relative to standard office corridors — the expense may be allocated only against the relevant area rather than the total building area, producing a separate recovery pool for that expense category.

== Lease structures for expense recovery ==
=== NNN (Triple Net) lease ===
In a net-net-net or triple-net (NNN) lease, the tenant pays base rent plus its pro rata share of all three major expense categories: CAM, property taxes, and insurance. The landlord receives base rent as a relatively net income stream, with operating cost variability passed through to tenants. NNN leases are standard in single-tenant retail, industrial, and net lease investment properties.

=== Gross lease ===
In a gross lease, the landlord pays all operating expenses out of base rent and does not recover them separately from tenants. The base rent in a gross lease is set higher than in a net lease to compensate the landlord for absorbing operating costs. True gross leases are increasingly rare in commercial markets; most commercial leases are modified gross or net leases with partial recovery provisions.

=== Modified gross lease ===
A modified gross lease falls between a full gross lease and a NNN lease. The landlord and tenant negotiate which expenses are recoverable and which the landlord absorbs. A common modified gross structure covers base rent plus electricity, with CAM, taxes, and insurance included in the base rent up to a negotiated level.

== Expense stops and base years ==
=== Expense stop ===
An expense stop (or recovery stop) is a threshold below which the landlord absorbs operating expenses and above which the tenant is responsible for its pro rata share of the excess. For example, a lease may provide that the landlord pays the first $8.00 per square foot of operating expenses per year, and the tenant pays its share of any excess above that amount. The stop is negotiated based on the estimated current year expense level so that the landlord bears initial costs and tenants absorb only future increases.

=== Base year ===
A base year provision sets the landlord's recoverable expense obligation at the actual expenses incurred in a specified base year — typically the first full calendar year of the lease. In subsequent years, the tenant pays its pro rata share of any increase in operating expenses above the base year level. The base year method is common in office leases and produces an effect similar to an expense stop, but automatically adjusts the threshold to actual incurred costs rather than a fixed dollar amount.

== Caps, floors, and ceilings ==
To protect tenants from large or unpredictable expense spikes, leases frequently include:

- Cap — a limit on the year-over-year percentage increase in recoverable expenses (commonly 3% to 5% per year on controllable expenses). Amounts exceeding the cap may be carried forward to future periods.
- Ceiling — an absolute maximum dollar amount of recoverable expenses payable by the tenant in any given period, regardless of actual costs.
- Floor — a minimum recovery amount payable by the tenant even if actual expenses fall below that level.

Caps typically apply only to controllable expenses — those within the landlord's management discretion, such as management fees and cleaning costs — and exclude uncontrollable expenses such as property taxes, insurance premiums, and utility costs, which are subject to market forces outside the landlord's control.

== Gross-up provisions ==
A gross-up provision addresses the distortion in expense allocation that arises when a building is not fully occupied. If operating expenses are divided among tenants based on their share of total building area, and a portion of the building is vacant, the occupied tenants' combined recoveries will not cover the full expense — the landlord absorbs the shortfall attributable to vacant space.

For expenses that vary with occupancy — such as electricity consumption and cleaning costs — landlords address this through a gross-up: the actual expense is adjusted upward to reflect what it would have been if the building were at a specified occupancy level (typically 90% to 95%), and this grossed-up figure is used as the basis for tenant recovery calculations:

$$\text{Grossed-Up Expense} = \text{Actual Expense} \times \frac{\text{Gross-Up Occupancy}\,\%}{\text{Actual Occupancy}\,\%}$$

Gross-up provisions ensure that the landlord does not subsidize vacancy costs and that each tenant's recovery obligation reflects a stabilized expense basis. Tenants negotiate gross-up provisions carefully because they can materially increase recovery obligations during periods of high building vacancy.

== Expense groups and CAM ==
To simplify recovery calculations across buildings with hundreds of individual expense line items, leases commonly group related expenses into expense pools or expense groups. The most prevalent grouping is common area maintenance (CAM), which typically includes:

- Janitorial and cleaning services for common areas
- Lighting and electricity for lobbies, corridors, and parking structures
- Landscaping and exterior maintenance
- Snow removal and de-icing
- Pest control
- Security (where not separately metered)
- Repairs and maintenance of common area systems

In NNN leases, CAM is combined with property taxes and insurance into a single recovery line item billed to tenants on a monthly estimated basis, with an annual reconciliation to actual costs. The reconciliation process — comparing estimated recovery payments to actual incurred expenses — results in either a refund to the tenant or a true-up payment owed by the tenant.

== Audit rights ==
Commercial leases typically grant tenants the right to audit the landlord's operating expense records to verify that recovery charges are calculated in accordance with the lease. Audit rights provisions specify the notice period required to initiate an audit, the lookback period covered (commonly one to three years), and the allocation of audit costs. Where an audit reveals a material overcharge — commonly defined as exceeding 3% to 5% of the amount billed — the lease may require the landlord to reimburse the tenant's audit costs in addition to correcting the overcharge.

== See also ==
- Additional rent
- Common area maintenance charges
- NNN lease
- Tenant inducement
- Net effective rent
- Leasing commission
- Commercial real estate
- Property management
- Operating expense
