= Net effective rent =

Net present value of lease payments after abatements and incentives

Net effective rent (NER), also called net effective rate, is a measure of the true economic income a landlord receives from a tenant over the full term of a lease, expressed as a per-period rate equivalent. It represents the net present value of all rental cash flows — including base rent payments, free rent periods, tenant improvement allowances, and other tenant inducements — divided by the total number of payment periods in the lease, and converted to the same units as the face rent.

NER is contrasted with face rent (also called gross rent or asking rent) — the stated contractual rental rate for the space before any abatements or concessions are applied. In markets where landlord concessions are common, the face rent overstates the landlord's actual economic return, making NER the more accurate basis for comparing lease transactions and valuing income-producing properties.

== Context and usage ==
Net effective rent is used primarily in commercial real estate — office, retail, and industrial leasing — where landlord concessions are standard negotiating tools. It is also applied in the residential rental market, particularly in high-density urban markets such as New York City, where free rent concessions are widely advertised.

NER allows landlords, tenants, brokers, and appraisers to compare leases with different concession structures on a common economic basis. Two leases with identical face rents but different concession packages will have different NERs, and the lease with the larger concession package will have a lower NER — reflecting the landlord's lower actual income and the tenant's lower actual cost.

== Components of net effective rent ==
NER incorporates all economic elements of the lease that affect the landlord's actual cash receipts:

=== Abatements (rent-reducing items) ===
- Free rent periods — months at the beginning or during the lease term in which no rent is payable; common as a move-in incentive or lease renewal concession
- Tenant improvement allowance — a landlord-funded credit applied against the tenant's cost of improving the space; economically equivalent to a reduction in rent
- Rent step reductions — periods in a stepped lease where rent is set below the long-term face rate
- Parking or storage concessions — waived fees for ancillary services that would otherwise add to occupancy cost

=== Additions (rent-increasing items) ===
- Rent escalations — scheduled rent increases over the lease term, whether fixed-dollar, fixed-percentage, or CPI-indexed
- Percentage rent — additional rent tied to tenant sales volume, common in retail leases
- Operating expense pass-throughs — recoverable expenses billed to the tenant above a base year or expense stop

== Formula ==
For a simplified NER calculation without time-value discounting:

$$\text{NER} = \frac{\text{Total Rent Paid over Lease Term} - \text{Total Abatements}}{\text{Total Lease Periods}}$$

For a rigorous NER calculation incorporating the time value of money:

$$\text{NER} = \frac{\displaystyle\sum_{t=1}^{n} \frac{CF_t}{(1+r)^t}}{n}$$

Where:

- $CF_t$ = net cash flow received in period $t$ (rent received minus concessions granted)
- $r$ = discount rate per period
- $n$ = total number of periods in the lease term

== Examples ==
=== Residential — free rent concession ===
A landlord offers one month of free rent on a 12-month lease at $1,500 per month (face rent). The tenant occupies for 13 months but pays rent for only 12:

$$\text{Total rent paid} = \$1{,}500 \times 12 = \$18{,}000$$
$$\text{NER} = \frac{\$18{,}000}{13} \approx \$1{,}385 \text{ per month}$$

The net effective rent of $1,385/month is the landlord's true average monthly income over the 13-month occupancy period, compared to the $1,500 face rent.

=== Commercial — periodic free rent ===
A landlord leases 10,000 square feet of office space for five years at $20 per square foot per month ($200,000/month face rent), with three months of free rent in years 2 and 4:

$$\text{Total face rent} = \$200{,}000 \times 60 = \$12{,}000{,}000$$
$$\text{Total abatements} = \$200{,}000 \times 6 = \$1{,}200{,}000$$
$$\text{NER} = \frac{\$12{,}000{,}000 - \$1{,}200{,}000}{60} = \$180{,}000 \text{ per month} = \$18\text{/psf}$$

The net effective rent of $18/psf reflects a 10% discount to the $20/psf face rent. A rigorous analysis would discount each future cash flow to today's dollars using an appropriate discount rate, reducing the NER further.

=== Commercial — tenant improvement allowance ===
A landlord offers a $50/psf tenant improvement allowance on a 5,000 square foot space leased for five years at $30/psf per year:

$$\text{Total face rent} = \$30 \times 5{,}000 \times 5 = \$750{,}000$$
$$\text{TI allowance} = \$50 \times 5{,}000 = \$250{,}000$$
$$\text{NER} = \frac{\$750{,}000 - \$250{,}000}{5} = \$100{,}000 \text{ per year} = \$20\text{/psf per year}$$

The TI allowance reduces the landlord's effective annual income from $30/psf to $20/psf on a simple basis.

== NER vs. face rent in market analysis ==
In commercial real estate markets experiencing high vacancy, landlords frequently maintain elevated face rents while competing aggressively on concession packages. This practice — sometimes called "shadow discounting" — preserves the nominal asking rent for comparable transaction purposes and appraisal records while delivering greater economic value to tenants through concessions.

Market analysts and appraisers use NER rather than face rent to track true rental market conditions because face rents in high-concession environments systematically overstate landlord income and understate the effective cost of occupancy to tenants.

== Relationship to property valuation ==
Because income-based property valuation depends on the landlord's actual economic income, NER rather than face rent is the appropriate input for direct capitalization and discounted cash flow models when significant concessions are present. Using face rent in valuation without adjusting for concessions overstates net operating income and inflates estimated property value.

== See also ==
- Tenant inducement
- Leasing commission
- Percentage rent
- Commercial real estate
- Net operating income
- Discounted cash flow
- Real estate appraisal
- Gross rent multiplier
