= Lease audit =

Lease audit is also referred to as Rent Audit, CAM Audit and Escalation Expense Audit. However, as the audit involves the inspection of other rights and obligations, names such as Lease Compliance Consulting and Lease Review are more appropriate.

Lease Audit is a systematic process consisting of the examination of all documents associated with the lease, the measurement of space and the interpretation of lease language.

Normally, it is the landlord who overcharged a tenant and the tenant therefore needs to perform a lease audit. Landlords, on the other hand, may also perform a lease audit against a tenant; this is mainly because of the percentage rent charged.

== Process ==
There are only a few books that talk about this subject. Articles are also limited.

Documents such as invoices, statements, amendment to lease and other correspondence from the landlord, as well as data from other sources will be audited to determine whether charges assessed by the landlord under a tenant’s lease have been proper.

Actual measurement of the tenant’s space and the total space in the property may be required while architectural drawings and surveys will be studied in order to find out the actual rental space of the tenant and the total rental space of the building. This will directly affect the tenant’s shares on the additional rental payments.

The lease will also be studied and interpreted in order to find out all the rights and obligations (such as exclusive right and the method to calculate percentage rent) associated with it, then the lease auditor will find out and advise the client if those obligations have been properly met and rights have never been lost.

Typically, lease auditors will look closely at items like base rent, percentage rent, proportion on additional rent, real estate taxes, repair and maintenance, exclusive right etc.

== Lease auditor ==
Lease audit involves different kind of proficiency: audit, law and real estate. Lease auditors need to have in-depth knowledge in general ledgers; assets and liabilities; realty tax assessment, real estate laws, leasing practice and more. Lease auditors are also expected to have excellent lease interpretation skills; analytical skills; research skills; communication skills and negotiation skills.

"In the past, when lease audit was a new term, lease auditors were traditionally lawyers, accountants and leasing managers who wanted to develop their career path on lease audit. Nowadays, lease audit is a very distinctive profession and its expertise is so special that it goes beyond the scope of each of those professions. One has to combine the knowledge of legal, leasing and auditing together in order to become a competent lease auditor. Broad leasing knowledge is needed to perform a professional lease audit and the lease auditors have to be professionally trained for years".

Regardless of the original professions, all lease auditors have to be trained in all the accounting, legal and real estate fields. Lease auditors are sensitive to figures and lease provisions, so that they can easily find out the “red flag” in the lease and locate the problems.

== Fee structure ==
A lease auditor can be an employee or an independent contractor. For independent contractors, there are 3 different type of fee structure: flat fee, hourly charge and contingent fee.

The first one is a piece job, the lease auditor will evaluate the time needed to perform the lease audit and then quote a price.

The second one is like what lawyers charge for their hourly jobs.

The last one is a percentage charge based on the saving (earning) that the customer (usually the tenant) can get from the lease audit. That is, the lease auditor will split the money saved from performing the audit with the customer. Rates depend on the scale of the assignment and can range from a 50/50 sharing over the life of the lease term to something more weighted to the Tenant’s benefit such as a 65/35 split.

Since the customers do not have to pay any out of pocket money and the obligation to pay only exists when the audits can get them the savings, most customers will choose the contingency basis one.
