= Feoffment =

Transfer of land under feudalism

In the Middle Ages, especially under the European feudal system, feoffment /ˈfɛfmənt/ or enfeoffment was the deed by which a person was given land in exchange for a pledge of service. This mechanism was later used to avoid restrictions on the passage of title in land by a system in which a landowner would give land to one person for the use of another. The common law of estates in land grew from this concept.

== Etymology ==
The word feoffment derives from the Old French feoffement or fieffement; compare with the Late Latin feoffamentum.

== England ==
In English law, feoffment was a transfer of land or property that gave the new holder the right to sell it as well as the right to pass it on to his heirs as an inheritance. It was total relinquishment and transfer of all rights of ownership of an estate in land from one individual to another. In feudal England a feoffment could only be made of a fee (or "fief"), which is an estate in land, that is to say an ownership of rights over land, rather than ownership of the land itself, the only true owner of which was the monarch under his allodial title. Enfeoffment could be made of fees of various feudal tenures, such as fee-tail or fee-simple. The term feoffment derives from a conflation of fee with off (meaning away), i.e. it expresses the concept of alienation of the fee, in the sense of a complete giving away of the ownership.

The medieval English law of property was based on the concept of transferring ownership by delivery: easy to do with a horse, but impossible with land, i.e. with immoveable property. Thus the conveyance (i.e. delivery) of land to the new tenant, known as the delivery of seisin, was generally effected on the land itself in a symbolic ceremony termed "feoffment with [de]livery of seisin." In the ceremony, the parties would go to the land with witnesses "and the transferor would then hand to the transferee a lump of soil or a twig from a tree – all the while intoning the appropriate words of grant, together with the magical words 'and his heirs' if the interest transferred was to be a potentially infinite one."

A written deed (traditionally a document impressed with the signature and seal of the transferor and the signatures of the witnesses), confirming the symbolic delivery, was customary—and became mandatory after 1677. Gradually the delivery of this deed to the new owner replaced the symbolic act of delivering an object representing the land, such as a piece of the soil. The feoffee (transferee) was henceforth said to hold his property "of" or "from" the feoffor, in return for a specified service (money payments were not used until much later). What service was given depended on the exact form of feudal land tenure involved. Thus, for every parcel of land, during the feudal era there existed a historical unbroken chain of feoffees, in the form of overlords, ultimately springing from feoffments made by William the Conqueror himself in 1066 as the highest overlord of all.

This pattern of land-holding was the natural product of William the Conqueror claiming an allodial title to all the land of England following the Norman Conquest of 1066, and parcelling it out as large fees in the form of feudal baronies to his followers, who then in turn subinfeudated (i.e. sub-divided) the lands comprising their baronies into manors to be held from them by their own followers and knights (in return, originally, for military service).

When the feoffee sub-enfeoffed his holding, for example when he created a new manor, he would become overlord to the person so enfeoffed, and a mesne lord (i.e. intermediate lord) within the longer historical chain of title. In modern English land law, the theory of such long historical chains of title still exists for every holding in fee simple, although for practical purposes it is not necessary at the time of conveyance to recite the descent of the fee from its creation. By the early 20th century it had become traditional to show the chain of former owners for a minimum period of 15 years only, as occupation for 12 years now barred all prior claims. And the establishment, in 1925, of a national Land Registry (a voluntary public record of land ownership) obviated the need for recitals of descent for registered parcels.

Subinfeudation of estates in fee simple was abolished in England in 1290 with the statute Quia Emptores. Thereafter, land could be alienated only by substitution, in which the seller gave up all interest in the land and the buyer owed any feudal duties to the overlord.

== Asia ==
In China and some other East Asian countries, from the time of the Zhou Dynasty (1046–256 BC) relatives and descendants of the ruling family were granted enfeoffments in return for pledging military service to the King or Emperor in times of war. The practice continued into the Han Dynasty, with people such as Cai Lun who was enfeoffed as the lord of a small village, Longting, for his services in papermaking innovations.

== See also ==
- Feoffee
- Fief
- Subinfeudation
- Frank almoin
- Sac and soc
