= Single net lease =

In the real estate industry within the United States a N Lease is one of the less widely utilized net lease structures, in which the tenant takes responsibility for some of the property's real estate expenses in addition to their business' operating expenses, unlike a gross lease. "N" stands for "Net", is pronounced "Single Net" and represents the property tax expense, which the tenant is responsible for paying in addition to operating expenses, in a single net lease. Unlike double and triple net leases, the landlord/lessor remains responsible for paying any insurance and maintenance expenses (i.e. in a single net lease the rent the landlord receives is net of property taxes, but not insurance and maintenance).
