= Common area =

Place in a building designated for all its inhabitants' use

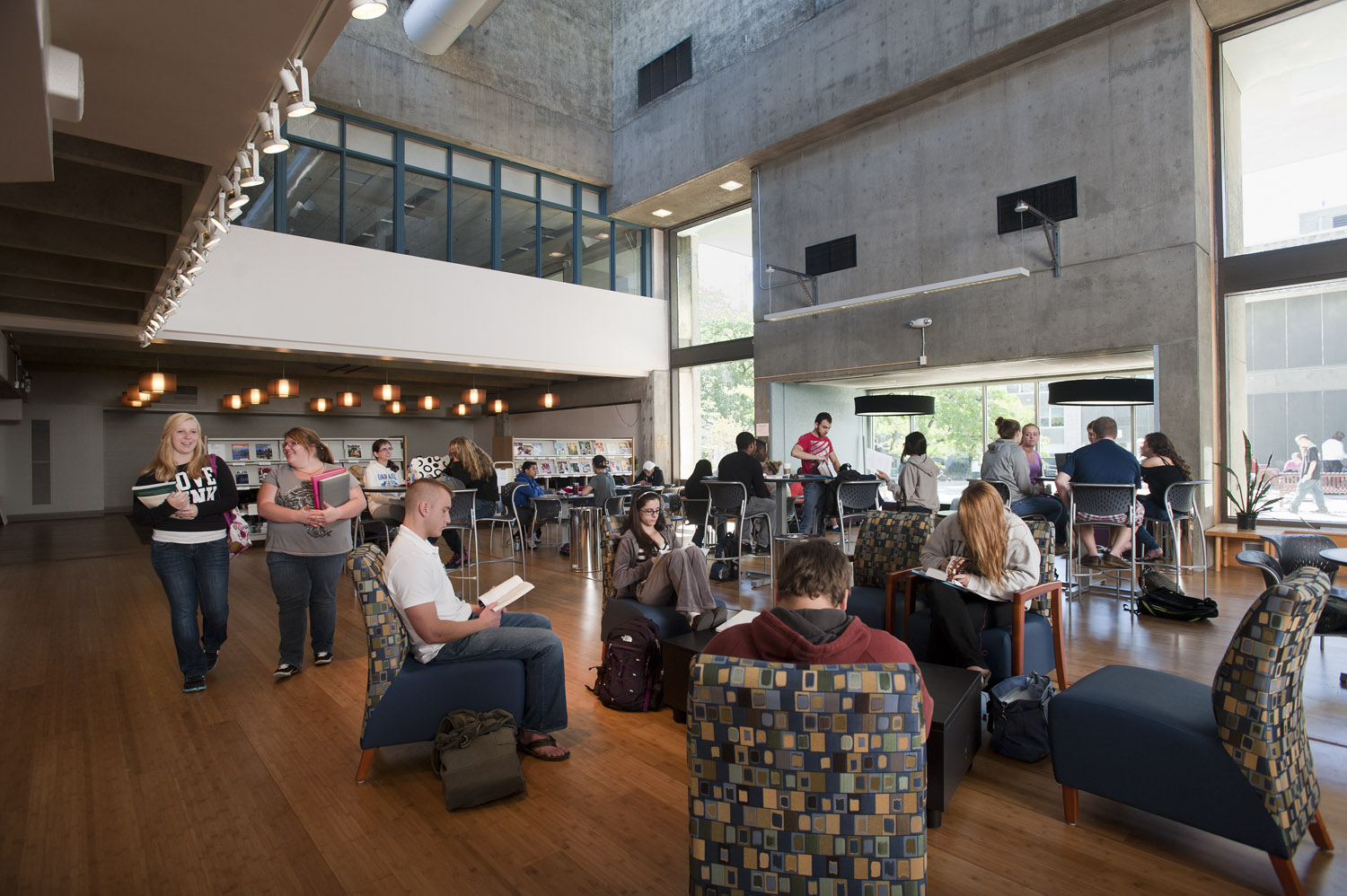
A common area in a library

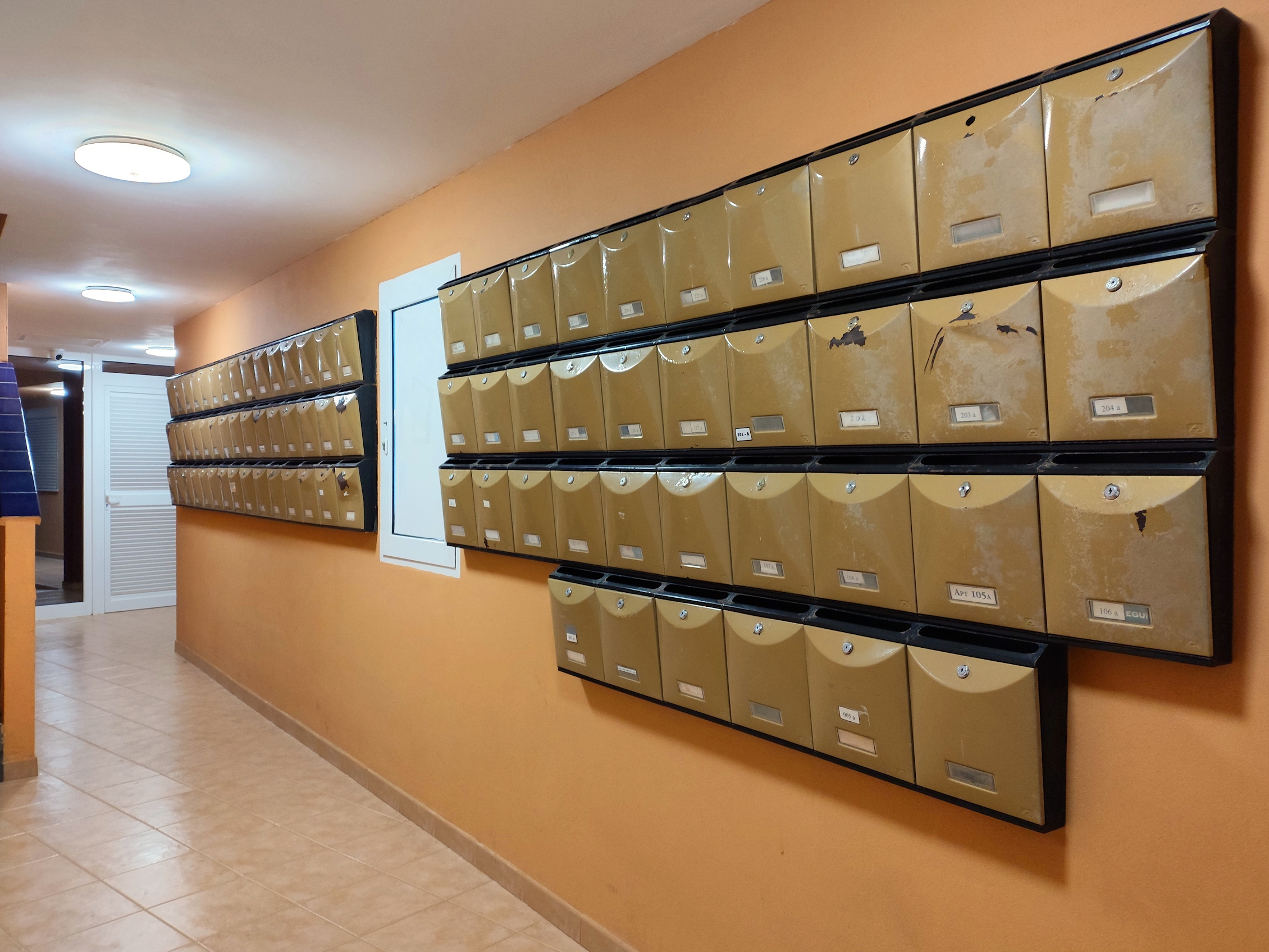
Common area letter boxes in an apartment building in Spain

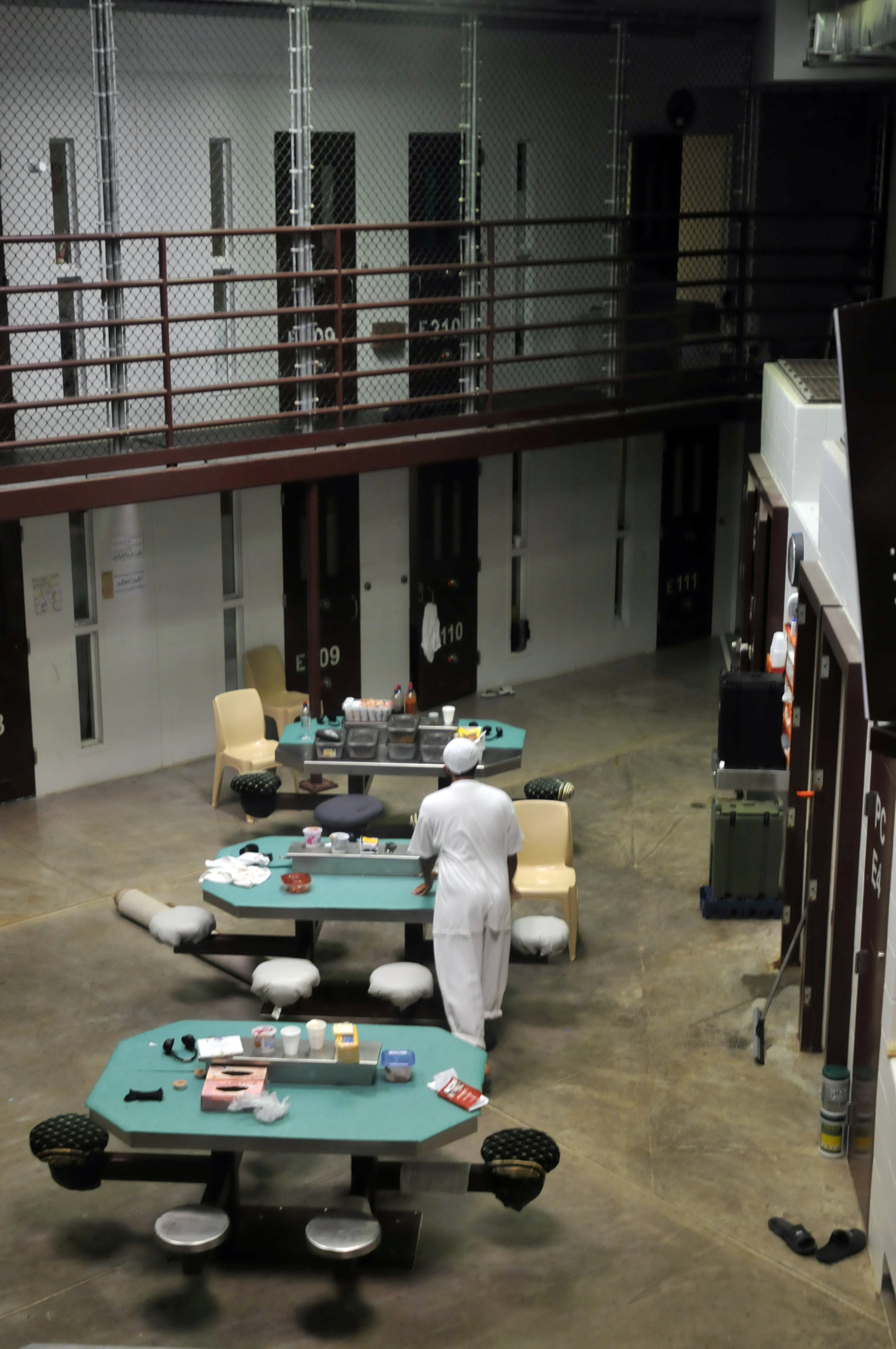
Common area at the Guantanamo Bay detention camp

A common area is, in real estate or real property law, the "area which is available for use by more than one person..." The common areas are those that are available for common use by all tenants, (or) groups of tenants and their invitees. In Texas and other parts of the United States, it is "An area inside a housing development owned by all residents or by an overall management structure which charges each tenant for maintenance and upkeep."

Common areas often exist in apartments, gated communities, condominiums, cooperatives, and shopping malls.

In any situation where there is a tenancy in common, all the tenants in common collectively own the common areas, meaning that any one individual owner does not possess more control over the land than any other owner.

This differs from a commons or common land, as used in English law, which is owned by one person, but which may be used by a group of persons.

== Examples ==
Examples of common areas include:

- lobbies,
- corridors,
- stairways,
- parking lots, spots, ramps, or other such areas,
- washing machines or laundry room,
- the roof of an apartment building,
- elevators,
- washrooms in lobby area,
- driveways, and
- store rooms.
- living rooms
- kitchens
- fitness facilities
- recreational areas
- club house

== Case law ==
In Maryland v. Garrison, the US Supreme Court found that police may enter a common area when executing a search warrant. Also, in Illinois v. Rodriguez the US Supreme Court held that "a warrantless entry is valid when based upon the consent of a third party whom the police, at the time of the entry, reasonably believe to possess common authority over the premises, but who in fact does not do so." Furthermore, the court held:

a person who permits others to have "joint access or control for most purposes ... assume[s] the risk that [such persons] might permit the common area to be searched." 415 U.S., at 171, n. 7; see also Frazier v. Cupp, 394 U.S. 731, 740 (1969) (holding that defendant who left a duffel bag at another's house and allowed joint use of the bag "assumed the risk that [the person] would allow someone else to look inside"). As the Court's assumption-of-risk analysis makes clear, third-party consent limits a person's ability to challenge the reasonableness of the search only because that person voluntarily has relinquished some of his expectation of privacy by sharing access or control over his property with another person.

—

== Residence halls ==
In residence halls of colleges and universities, the common areas are those spaces in a dorm that are for the use of all the student residents. In order to paint murals, improve with fixtures, or otherwise change the common area, permission may have to be obtained from the director of residential life. Legally, there is nothing that a tenant can do if they do not approve of their common area furnishings, decorations, etc. unless it interferes directly with a disability. Anything pertaining to religion or beliefs are all covered under the Fair Housing Law. The only way to control common areas in this regard is if a serious threat was posed. State-run universities do have the authority to prohibit use of common areas should they see fit (whether that be decorating, furnishings, or physical use). For-profit housing can only limit these things to some extent. They cannot legally control every aspect of common area use because of the aforementioned Fair Housing Laws.

== Business spaces ==
Common area also applies to organizations such as shopping malls and strip malls, in which multiple businesses operate. Oftentimes, business parks, malls, and other multi-company facilities will have a common area. This could be any one of the examples listed above or it could take form of a "break room". These areas are generally centrally located and for everyone's use within the businesses involved. There can be stipulations on conduct within the common areas as well as availability of the common areas. Businesses may also have common areas within themselves. Typically the businesses with common areas will have their own rules that cater to their business type, policy, and company vision.

== Real estate taxation of common areas ==
States vary in how they tax common areas, for real estate tax purposes. It may depend on whether it is a condo or a co-op. For example, the state of Arizona taxes "residential common areas" in housing developments with a flat tax, but common areas of condominiums and golf courses are assessed separately.

== Stipulations with various common area types ==
Depending upon the common area type (i.e. business, residential, state-owned) there are certain precautions one must take with utilizing them. Some require leases, some require contracts, and some only require a spoken pledge. For example, businesses may share common areas in a store that accepts vendors from multiple backgrounds. It is understood in a lease or contract that they will share space with these different vendors. With apartments, there are two different types of common areas a developer can have. One would be under contract and the other would be under lease. Apartments that rent by the unit (i.e. conventional housing) are signed for by one individual. That one individual legally decides the use of the common area should they ever gain a roommate in the future. If an apartment complex leases by the bedroom, there is a clause or paragraph detailing how the space is to be used equally between all lease holders. Lastly, there are state-owned and mandated common areas. Forts and bases, government run facilities, and even jails have common areas. There is no agreement in a lease stating how those areas should be used. There are different kinds of common areas and all of them have different rules and stipulations. They all have different legal proceedings should something happen in those areas.

== Loss factor ==
In commercial real estate in the US, a building's loss factor is the percentage of the building's area shared by tenants or space that are dedicated to the common areas of a building used to calculate the difference between the net (usable) and gross (billable) areas.

That portion of the space is considered "lost" because it cannot be directly leased and the maintenance and operation costs must be covered by the other rentable areas.

The loss factor is often confused with load factor, but the formulas for each term vary.

The loss factor is calculated as follows:

$$\text{Loss factor } = \frac{\text{(Rentable area – Usable area)}}{\text{Rentable area}}$$

The Building Owners and Managers Association has established a standard with American National Standards Institute, ANSI/BOMA Z65.1-2010 for measuring floor area and calculating gross leasable area and loss factor.

== See also ==
- Common area maintenance charges
- Common land, also known as a "commons"
- Common law
- The Common Law
- Common Travel Area
- Condominium
- Curtilage
- Kehrwoche
- Loss factor (real estate)
- Reserves for common-interest developments
