= Porter's wages =

Porter's wages is an accounting method used in commercial real estate to calculate inflation of certain recoverable expenses.

The term "porters" normally refers to people who carry objects, like bellhops in hotels, but for historical reasons in the United States it also came to cover the cleaning and maintenance staff as they were represented by the same unions. Union membership resulted in scheduled increases in pay, typically every three years. In the porter's wages methodology, these increases are used as an index for inflationary adjustments.

The system was normally calculated on a pennies per penny basis, in which the expense would increase over a base year value by a certain amount of pennies per penny of wage increase. So for instance, if the wages in a given year increased from $15/hour to $16, that represents a 100 pennies increase. If the rate was "one penny per penny", then a $1 per-square-foot charge would be added to the additional rent to account for this.

The system is based on the underlying assumption that the cost of cleaning is primarily due to labour and scales roughly with building size - a building that is twice as large will likely take twice as long to clean and thus cost twice as much to do so. In this case, the increases in the wages will be roughly linear with the per-square-foot costs.

The method was mostly used in New York City and Chicago. In most other jurisdictions, a simple inflationary figure, like "1.5% per year" is more common. The system has fallen from use for a variety of reasons, the main one being that the porter's wages are only a portion of the overall cost of cleaning maintenance, whose actual costs might change out of proportion to any wage inflation. As a result, increases based on this system tended to lead or lag the actual costs being recovered.
