= Habendum clause =

Deed or lease clause defining the type of interest conveyed to the grantee

A habendum clause is a clause in a deed or lease that defines the type of interest and rights to be enjoyed by the grantee or lessee. In a deed, the habendum clause follows the granting clause and specifies the estate being conveyed, whether fee simple, life estate, leasehold, or another form of ownership interest, along with any conditions, limitations, or restrictions attached to that interest.

== Etymology and historical origins ==
The term habendum derives from the Latin phrase habendum et tenendum, meaning "to have and to hold." This phrase historically opened the habendum clause in common law deeds and remains in widespread use in contemporary conveyancing practice as a formulaic introduction to the clause.

Technically, the Latin phrase combines two distinct legal concepts:

- Latin: habendum ("to have") — addressed the quantity of interest or estate which the grantee was to receive in the property
- Latin: tenendum ("to hold") — addressed the tenure upon which the land was to be held relative to a superior lord

The tenendum clause is therefore sometimes considered a conceptually separate clause from the habendum proper. The habendum dealt with the relationship between the possessor and the land, how the land was to be had, while the tenendum dealt with the relationship between the possessor and his immediately superior lord, how the land was to be held in the feudal tenure system. The obsolescence of land tenure in modern common law jurisdictions has rendered this distinction largely historical and academic, and the two are now treated as a single unified clause in practice.

== Function in deeds ==
In a modern deed, the habendum clause performs several functions:

=== Defining the estate conveyed ===
The habendum clause specifies the estate in land being transferred. Common formulations include:

- Fee simple absolute — "to have and to hold... to the grantee, their heirs and assigns forever" — conveys the fullest possible ownership interest with no restrictions
- Fee simple defeasible — conveys fee simple subject to a condition subsequent or a condition precedent, allowing the grantor to reclaim the property upon occurrence of a specified event
- Life estate — "to have and to hold... for the duration of the natural life of [grantee]" — limits ownership to the lifetime of a named individual
- Fee tail — historically limited descent to lineal heirs; largely abolished in modern jurisdictions

=== Defining limitations and conditions ===
Where the grantor conveys an interest less than fee simple absolute, such as a time share interest, a conservation easement, or a use-restricted parcel, the habendum clause specifies the owner's rights as well as how those rights are limited. Limitations may include a specific time frame, a prohibition on certain activities, or a restriction tied to a qualifying condition.

=== Agreement with the granting clause ===
The provisions of the habendum clause must be consistent with and cannot contradict the granting clause. Where a conflict exists between the granting clause and the habendum clause, courts have historically given priority to the granting clause on the grounds that it is the operative conveyancing language, though this rule varies by jurisdiction.

=== Recording requirements ===
Many U.S. states require a deed to contain a habendum clause to be officially recorded. In Pennsylvania, for example, the absence of a habendum clause may prevent a deed from being recognized and recorded by the Recorder of Deeds, affecting the enforceability of the conveyance against third parties.

== Function in oil and gas leases ==
Habendum clauses appear prominently in oil and gas leases, where they serve a distinct function from their role in deeds. In the oil and gas context, the habendum clause defines the duration of the leasehold interest: specifically, the primary and secondary terms of the lease.

=== Primary term ===
The primary term is a fixed period, typically one to ten years, during which the lessee may hold the lease without being required to produce oil or gas. The lessee pays a delay rental to maintain the lease in force during this period. If no drilling or production activity commences before the primary term expires, the lease terminates automatically.

=== Secondary term ===
The secondary term is defined by production rather than by a fixed period. A standard habendum clause for an oil and gas lease provides that the lease will remain in force "for a term of [X] years and so long thereafter as oil and gas is produced in paying quantities." The phrase "paying quantities" is a term of art requiring that production revenues exceed operating costs, not merely that hydrocarbons are physically present.

If production in paying quantities ceases during the secondary term, the lease terminates unless savings clauses, such as a shut-in royalty clause, a force majeure clause, or a continuous drilling clause, operate to preserve it.

=== Variations ===
Some oil and gas habendum clauses include additional provisions that extend the lease beyond a cessation of production, including:

- Shut-in royalty clause — allows a lessee to pay a nominal royalty to hold a lease when a completed well is capable of production but shut in due to lack of pipeline connection or market
- Continuous operations clause — preserves the lease if the lessee maintains active drilling or completion operations without interruption
- Pugh clause — severs a lease as to non-producing depths or non-pooled acreage when a portion of the lease is committed to a unit

== Comparison with related clauses ==
| Clause | Location in deed | Function |
|---|---|---|
| Granting clause | Precedes habendum | Identifies grantor, grantee, and property; operative words of conveyance |
| Habendum clause | Follows granting clause | Defines type of estate and limitations on the interest conveyed |
| Tenendum clause | Historically part of habendum | Defined tenure relationship; now merged into habendum in modern deeds |
| Reddendum clause | Follows habendum | Reserves rights or interests in the grantor (e.g., easement, covenant) |
| Warranty clause | Near end of deed | Grantor's covenant to defend title against third-party claims |

== See also ==
- Oil and gas law
