= Rule in Dumpor's Case =

Common law rule in property law

The Rule in Dumpor's Case is a common law rule of property law first set forth by Sir Edward Coke in 1578 (4 Coke 119b [1578]), in the case of Dumpor v. Syms. In its most basic form, it states that once a landlord has consented to an assignment of a tenant's interest in a leasehold estate, the landlord implicitly consents to all future assignments by the assignee.

This rule is still operative in some U.S. states and some other jurisdictions which follow English common law. The rule was abolished in England in 1859, as it has been in a number of U.S. states, but this does not automatically invalidate the rule in other jurisdictions which follow English common law. Parties sometimes seek to contract around the rule by putting a clause in the lease agreement (or in the document approving an assignment) reserving the landlord's right to approve or disapprove a future assignment. Whether this is valid, or how the parties may circumvent the rule in a different way if they are in a jurisdiction that follows the rule, depends the law of the jurisdiction where the real property is located.
