= Ecuadorian Institute of Intellectual Property =

- Industry: R&D
- Founded: 1998
- Headquarters: Av. República 396 y Diego de Almagro. Edif. Forum 300, Quito, Ecuador
- Key people: Santiago Cevallos
- Services: Processing of registration application, registration or granting of rights, trademarks, trade name, slogan, dress, appellation of origin. Recognition process of foreign appellation of origin. Search Report general and special logos. Patent rights, patents, industrial designs and utility models. Issuance of grant or registration of rights to patents, industrial designs and utility models. Processing of request for changes to patents, industrial designs and utility models. Amendments to the patent application for division or merger. Annual maintenance of patents nationally or internationally, and utility models.
- Number of employees: 150+ (2011)
- Website: IEPI

The Ecuadorian Institute of Intellectual Property or (IEPI) is the only public agency in Ecuador, whose function is to ensure on behalf of the Ecuadorian State Intellectual Property Rights established in the Law, as in treaties and conventions, according to the Universal Declaration of Human Rights adopted by United Nations Organization, recognizing it as a fundamental protection of intellectual creations.

== History ==
In Ecuador there was a body responsible for ensuring the rights of intellectual property, specialized carriers were divided between the Ministry, Copyright was the responsibility of the Ministry of Education, the industrial property under the direction of the Ministry of Industry and Varieties Plants run by the Ministry of Agriculture.

The IEPI was created May 19, 1998 with the aim of bringing together all airlines, industrial property, copyrights, plant varieties, traditional knowledge and Wine. The IEPI exercises powers and authority established by the Copyright Act, considering the same for the purposes set out in decisions of the Commission of the Andean Community.

== Industrial property ==
It is the Directorate responsible for promoting respect for Intellectual Property, through education, dissemination and enforcement of existing legal rules, based on the recognition of industrial property rights in all its manifestations, with quality management in the registry and ensuring access and dissemination of state of the art.

Industrial property including inventions, patents, trademarks, industrial designs and geographical indications of origin, and copyright, which includes literary and artistic works such as novels, poems and plays, films, musical works, works of art such as drawings, paintings, photographs and sculptures, and architectural designs. It promotes and abiding respect for Industrial Property, through education, outreach and monitoring the implementation of existing legal provisions established in recognition of industrial property rights in all its manifestations, management, quality recording and ensuring access and dissemination of it.
