= National Bank of New Zealand Ltd v Ram =

- Court: District Court of New Zealand
- Full case name: National Bank of New Zealand Limited v Martin Ram
- Citation: (1992) 4 NZBLC 102,618

Court membership
- Judge sitting: Williams M

Keywords
- minor

National Bank of New Zealand Ltd v Ram [1992] 4 NZBLC 102,619 is a New Zealand case that covers the grey area of the legal capacity of minors when they are between 18 and 20 years old.

== Background ==
Martin Ram was an 18-year-old high school student. His brother was in the process of purchasing a takeaway bar, and was using a company structure to own it. Due to a legal requirement at the time, a company needed at least two shareholders, resulting in Ram taking only a nominal shareholding of only one share (and his brother owning the remaining shares). Ram took no involvement in his brother's new business.

Unfortunately for Ram, the company sought a loan from the National Bank, which required all shareholders to personally guarantee the debt. The loan later came into default, and the bank sued both shareholders individually under the guarantees they gave earlier.

Ram filed a defense under section 5(2) of the Minors Contracts Act claiming the guarantee was oppressive, as he claimed the bank did not explain the nature and effect of the guarantee at the time he signed.

== Decision ==
Ram if he was aged under 18 or less when he signed the guarantee, would have a rock solid defence because contracts entered into by minors aged under 18 are legally void i.e. not legally enforceable (although there are some exceptions). However, because he was aged 18, Ram had to meet the much tougher standard of the contract being merely voidable, i.e. he had to show that the contract was unfair to him.

Master Williams QC said:

The result is that contracts with persons under the age of 18 years are unenforceable against them if the District Court orders to the contrary, contracts with persons aged 18 and 19 years of age are enforceable against them unless the District Court orders to the contrary and contracts with persons 20 years of age and over all married persons of whatever age are fully enforceable against them.

Ultimately Ram's defence failed, as the judge found it improbable that the bank officer would not have explained the terms of the contract to him. Ram's defense also failed because at the time he had a lawyer that he could have consulted with, but ultimately chose not to discuss this with his lawyer. Ram was ordered liable to pay the debt.
