= Bond lease =

In United States real estate, a bond lease, also called an absolute triple net lease, true triple net lease or even a hell-or-high-water lease is the most extreme form of the NNN lease, in which the tenant is responsible for every fathomable real estate risk related to the property and is responsible for every single property related expense, even in instances of a material casualty/condemnation.

== Casualties and acts of God ==
The term bond or bondable is primarily used in higher structured lease forms which also include a requirement that the tenant completely backstop casualty and condemnation loss in addition to assuming all other payment and performance obligations generally associated with a standard triple net lease. At first glance a bond lease may appear identical to a triple net lease, as the tenant is usually responsible for paying all the property taxes, insurance, and maintenance under both lease structures; however in a bond lease the tenant is obligated to rebuild after a casualty (acts of God included) or continue paying rent should the property be condemned.

== Lease termination ==
Further, the tenant cannot terminate the lease or seek any rent abatements. Should a material casualty or condemnation occur (a 50% threshold is generally utilized) resulting in the tenant's inability to restore the property to operable condition of its original intended use, tenant may only attempt to terminate the lease upon delivering a rejectable purchase offer which is usually calculated to cover any debt as well as provide a return of any equity.

== Environmental matters ==
Further, tenant is responsible for all environmental matters, no matter what the cause. It has been argued that following a major casualty or irreparable condemnation, the tenant isn't required to continue paying rent without abatements, even under a bond lease. The argument follows that under certain circumstances such a material event may even be construed as "constructive eviction" ultimately allowing the bond tenant to walk away from the property without providing a rejectable offer or other termination payment provision. Examples of case law exist however; which uphold the "hell or high water" clause as well as the constructive eviction argument. When analyzing any commercial lease it is always advisable to have the lease reviewed by legal counsel and pay close attention to the local state real estate laws.
