= Good guy clause =

Lease provision releasing tenant from liability upon early vacation of premises

A good guy clause is a provision commonly found in commercial lease agreements, particularly in New York City, that allows a tenant to be released from personal liability for the remainder of the lease term, provided the tenant gives advance written notice of intent to vacate, surrenders the premises in the condition required by the lease, and pays all rent and charges accrued up to the date of surrender. The clause functions as a conditional early termination mechanism that protects both parties: the landlord recovers an empty, rentable space without litigation, and the tenant — or more precisely, the personal guarantor of the lease — extinguishes future liability on a lease that would otherwise run to its stated expiration date.

Good guy clauses are most prevalent in New York City commercial real estate but appear in other major urban markets. They are found primarily in office and retail leases rather than residential leases, and most frequently in transactions where a personal guarantee accompanies the lease.

== History ==
New York City's commercial leasing market in the 1980s and 1990s generated significant friction between landlords and tenants of small businesses and start-ups. Landlords routinely required personal guarantees from principals of closely held companies as a condition of leasing office space. When a tenant company encountered financial difficulty, principals had competing incentives: surrendering the space triggered personal liability for the remaining lease term, while staying in occupancy — even without paying rent — delayed that liability and forced the landlord into a costly eviction proceeding.

Landlords bore the litigation burden of eviction while simultaneously being unable to re-lease the space to a paying tenant. The good guy clause emerged as a market solution to this standoff, offering guarantors a defined exit path that extinguished personal liability in exchange for cooperative, timely surrender of the premises.

The clause became a standard negotiating point in New York City commercial leases throughout the 1990s and 2000s, and its use has since expanded to commercial markets in other major U.S. cities.

== Structure and operation ==
A good guy clause is typically embedded within or appended to a personal guarantee of lease rather than in the body of the lease itself, though it may also appear as a standalone lease provision. Its core elements are:

=== Notice requirement ===
The tenant or guarantor must deliver written notice of intent to vacate to the landlord within a specified period before the surrender date. Notice periods of 60 to 90 days are standard in New York City commercial practice, though the parties may negotiate shorter or longer periods. Failure to provide timely notice typically voids the good guy protection, leaving the guarantor fully liable for the remainder of the lease term.

=== Surrender conditions ===
The tenant must vacate the premises and return them to the landlord in the condition specified by the lease — typically described as vacant, broom clean, and free of the tenant's personal property and trade fixtures. The clause may also require that the tenant restore any alterations made during occupancy unless the landlord has previously consented to their retention.

=== Payment of accrued obligations ===
All monetary obligations due and payable through the date of surrender — including base rent, additional rent, operating expense escalations, and any other charges under the lease — must be paid current as a condition of activating the good guy release. The guarantor's liability for amounts accrued prior to surrender is not extinguished; only future rent obligations are released.

=== Release of future liability ===
Upon satisfying all conditions, the guarantor is released from personal liability for rent and charges that would have accrued after the surrender date through the original lease expiration. The tenant entity itself may remain obligated under the lease depending on the specific language of the clause and any related agreements, though in practice a compliant good guy surrender typically results in a negotiated termination of the lease itself.

== Relationship to personal guarantees ==
The good guy clause is most significant in the context of a personal guarantee of lease. Without a good guy provision, a personal guarantor of a commercial lease is liable for all rent and charges through the end of the lease term regardless of whether the tenant vacates. In a long-term lease, this exposure can represent years of rent obligations.

The good guy clause caps this exposure at the point of compliant surrender, converting an open-ended personal guarantee into a conditional liability instrument. For this reason, the clause is sometimes called a good guy guarantee when structured as a modified personal guarantee document rather than as a lease clause.

Landlords accept good guy clauses because the alternative — pursuing a guarantor for future rent while simultaneously managing an occupied but non-paying tenant through eviction — is operationally and economically worse than recovering the space cleanly and promptly re-letting it to a new tenant.

== Landlord and tenant considerations ==
=== Tenant considerations ===
- Activates early termination without litigation
- Eliminates personal liability for post-surrender rent
- Requires strict compliance with notice and surrender conditions — partial compliance does not trigger the release
- Early surrender forfeits any remaining tenant improvement allowance or unamortized landlord concessions unless otherwise negotiated

=== Landlord considerations ===
- Recovers rentable space without eviction proceedings
- Receives the space in lease-required condition, ready for re-letting
- Loses the rent stream for the balance of the original term
- May negotiate a minimum occupancy period — a floor below which the good guy clause cannot be invoked — to ensure a baseline tenancy duration before early exit is permitted

== Minimum occupancy floor ==
Landlords frequently negotiate a minimum occupancy requirement as a counterweight to the good guy clause. This provision prohibits the tenant from invoking the good guy termination right until a minimum period — often 12 to 24 months — of the lease term has elapsed. The minimum floor protects the landlord's tenant improvement investment and leasing commission expenditures, which are typically amortized over the full lease term and are not recovered if the tenant exits in the early months of occupancy.

== See also ==
- Lease
- Personal guarantee
- Commercial property
- Eviction
- Landlord
- Habendum clause
- New York City real estate
