= Credit tenant lease =

Method of financing real estate

A credit tenant lease (also known as a "bondable lease") is a method of financing real estate. A "credit tenant lease" is a lease from a landlord to a tenant that carries sufficient guarantees that lenders will perceive the rent cash flows from the lease are as reliable as a corporate bond. This typically requires that the tenant have exceptionally good credit (thus, the name "credit tenant lease"), often that the property is essential to the tenant (corporate headquarters, a key manufacturing facility, or the like), and contractual obligations that ensure that these rents will be among the tenant's highest obligations. Usually, the lease is structured as a triple net lease, in which a tenant is responsible for insurance, property taxes, and most or all repair and maintenance costs.

When a landlord borrows money to finance the property, the lender needs adequate collateral in order to lend to the landlord who wants to buy the property. If the landlord has a committed lessee who has an outstanding record of timely payment, then the lender is willing to accept the tenant's commitment to pay the lease payments to the landlord to pass through the landlord as collateral for payment to the lender. In other words, if the lease payments from tenant to landlord have the credit rating of a bond, the lender will accept that synthetic bond due to the landlord as collateral for a loan to the landlord. In credit tenant financing, typically the loan from the lender to the landlord is structured as nonrecourse debt.

Credit tenant leases may be created either in sale/leaseback transactions, or new purchase transactions.

Credit tenant lease loans are typically coterminous (i.e., ending at the same time) as the lease itself. Occasionally, credit tenant leases are arranged as double net leases, which can increase cash on cash returns for a landlord, but will increase their overall risk, especially as a property grows older.

A "credit tenant" is a tenant with exceptionally good credit, such that the lender to the landlord has very high assurance of timely payment of principal and interest. A credit tenant is almost always a Aa or better corporation, a large regional tenant, or a local tenant with excellent credit that may be better than their national competitors. Only larger companies are eligible for credit tenant treatment by lenders. A lender will offer better financing terms for a development with a certain amount of space preleased or currently leased to credit tenants.
