= Step rent =

Step rent, also known as step-up rent or step-up lease, is a type of additional rent term found in commercial real estate where the rent increases or decreases at defined periods. It is generally used to simplify accounting by separating out the increases due to inflation into a separate row in the accounts.

For instance, a lease might specify the rent to be $1000 per month, and then add a second step rent term of $20 per year to account for inflation. Depending on the methodology, the term might be a simple dollar term, or it might be a percentage increase. The later is sometimes known as CPI rent, referring to the consumer price index, or CPI.

Modern electronic accounting systems can automatically apply such adjustments, and on such systems step rent may no longer be entered separately, but instead as part of the base rent terms.
