= Kehrwoche =

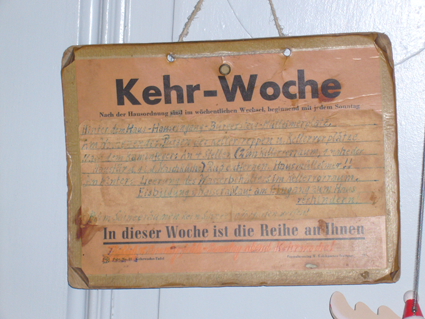
Sign "Kehr-Woche". The text says: "This week it is your turn"

Kehrwoche ("week of sweeping") is the weekly duty of cleaning communal living areas, and is a custom in the Swabia region of southwest Germany. The custom began at the end of the 15th century as a way to improve household cleanliness. Until 1988, communal law required households to take turns every Saturday cleaning common property both indoors and outdoors, such as stairways, adjacent pathways, etc. Nowadays, Kehrwoche may be included in rental agreements as a weekly obligation for residents.

== History ==
Stuttgart's municipal law from 1492 states, "To ensure that the city stays clean, everyone should remove their soil, (...) from your own street corner every 14 days, although only at night. Those who do not have a privy, must bring the waste to the stream." In the 18th century, a new law, the "clean alley regulation" came about, that added detail. In 1988 the kehrwoche was abolished as a communal law. It doesn't apply to public order in any part of Baden-Wurtemberg, but it can be part of house rules and rental contracts. The communal order obliges every owner of a house to hold parts of his property, like entrance areas and access paths as well as the public pavements free of dirt, snow and ice. There is no determined time or interval, making it a permanent obligation, contrary to the weekly duty on Saturdays as in the tradition of the kehrwoche.

== Situation today ==
In Württemberg, as generally in Germany and other countries, it is typical to include the cleaning activities in the rental agreement, describing which parties on which days clean the pavement, shovel snow and clean the staircases. Also a sign displaying the bolded letters "Kehrwoche" is often hung on the door of the party responsible for the Kehrwoche activities of the week. The rental owner as well as the other tenants can see who is responsible for such tasks.

Agreements distinguish between "small" and "large" kehrwoche. Small kehrwoche includes hallways and staircases. Large kehrwoche includes the pavement in front of the house. Outside Württemberg, the cleaning of multi-tenant property is organised very similarly, using "large and small house rules" with identical meaning, as long as the delegation of cleaning responsibilities is not given to costly outside vendors or building superintendent.

The Kehrwoche is often cited as something highly characteristic of Swabians or of Wurttemberg, often seen as proving their pettifogging obsession with order. In fact it proves to be more of a myth, or a projection of a German characteristic on one particular of its ethnic subgroups.

== Books ==
- Wolfgang Brenneisen, Peter Ruge: G'schimpft und g'lacht über d' Kehrwoch. Drw, 2003. ISBN 3-87181-490-3
- Andreas Reichert: Die Schwäbische Kehrwoche, ISBN 3925185038
- Christoph Sonntag, Gerhard Drexel: Schwäbische populäre Irrtümer. Ein Lexikon. Edition Q, 2006. ISBN 3-86124-603-1
