= Estate in land =

Concept in English and Welsh property law

An estate in land is, in the law of England and Wales, an interest in real property that is or may become possessory. It is a type of personal property and encompasses land ownership, rental and other arrangements that give people the right to use land. This is distinct from sovereignty over the land, which includes the right to government and taxation.

This should be distinguished from an "estate" as used in reference to an area of land, and "estate" as used to refer to property in general.

In property law, the rights and interests associated with an estate in land may be conceptually understood as a "bundle of rights" because of the potential for different parties having different interests in the same real property.

== Categories of estates ==
Estates in land can be divided into four basic categories:

1. Freehold estates: rights of conveyable exclusive possession and use, having immobility and indeterminate duration
  - fee simple
    - fee simple absolute—most rights, least limitations, indefeasible
  - defeasible estate—voidable possession and use
    - fee simple determinable
    - fee simple subject to a condition subsequent
    - fee simple subject to executory limitation
  - finite estate—limited to lifetimes
    - life estate—fragmented possession and use for duration of someone's life
    - fee tail—inalienable rights of inheritance for duration of family line
2. Leasehold estates: rights of possession and use but not ownership. The lessor (owner/landlord) gives this right to the lessee (tenant). There are four categories of leasehold estates:
  1. estate for years (a term of year absolute or tenancy for years)—lease of any length with specific begin and end date
  2. periodic estate (periodic tenancy)—automatically renewing lease (month to month, week to week)
  3. estate at will (tenancy at will)—leasehold for no fixed time or period. It lasts as long as both parties desire. Termination is bilateral (either party may terminate at any time) or by operation of law.
  4. tenancy at sufferance—created when tenant remains after lease expires and becomes a holdover tenant, converts to holdover tenancy upon landlord acceptance.
  - Types of leases:
    - gross lease
    - net lease
    - percentage lease
3. Concurrent estates: owned or possessed by two or more individuals simultaneously.
  1. tenancy by the entirety
  2. joint tenancy
  3. tenancy in common
  4. statutory estates: created by statute:
    - community property
    - homestead — protection from claim by creditors
    - dower—interest a wife has in the property of her husband
    - curtesy—interest a husband has in the property of his wife
4. Equitable estates: neither ownership nor possession
  - Future interests — interests in real or personal property, a gift or trust, or other things in which the privilege of possession or of enjoyment is in the future and not the present
    - reversions
    - possibilities of reverter
    - powers of termination, also known as rights of reentry for condition broken
    - remainders
    - executory interests
  - Incorporeal interests — those that cannot be possessed physically, since they consist of rights of a particular user, or the right to enforce an agreement concerning use
    - easement
      - easement in gross
      - easement appurtenant
        - ingress
        - egress
    - profits
    - real covenants
      - covenant appurtenant
      - covenant in gross
    - equitable servitudes
    - licenses
  - Lien
    - general
    - specific
