= NNN lease =

Lease arrangement in US property law

In commercial real estate leases in the United States, the tenant, rather than the landlord, is usually responsible for real estate taxes, maintenance, and insurance. In a "net lease", in addition to base rent, the tenant or lessee is responsible for paying some or all of the recoverable expenses related to real-estate ownership. As the rent collected under a net lease is "net" after expenses are passed through to tenants to be paid, the rent tends to be lower than rent charged under a "gross lease".

Net lease types include single net, double net, and triple net leases, depending on the number of items they include. The term "net lease" is often used as a shorthand expression for any of these arrangements. The three most common expenses charged back are property taxes, insurance, and maintenance, often called the "three nets". A triple net lease that includes the three nets is particularly common and is often abbreviated in writing as "NNN lease" but is still pronounced as "triple net lease".

== Variations ==
=== Single-tenant net lease ===
NNN leased investments are generally leased to one single tenant and are thus referred to as STNLs or Single Tenant Net Leases. A NNN lease investment can however have two or more tenants, and it would not be considered an STNL investment. An example of this would be a Starbucks & MetroPCS which share a building under two separate NNN leases, or a retail strip center where all tenants are wrapped into one NNN lease. Both examples would be considered NNN leased investments; however, they would not be STNLs. The risk of default is spread out over more than one tenant in such NNN deals (e.g., if either Starbucks or MetroPCS goes bankrupt, the other tenant continues to pay the rent due under their NNN lease). Such deals can appeal to investors seeking to spread risk, though the simplicity of collecting one rent check from one tenant is forfeited.

=== Double net lease ===
Another variation of the NNN lease is the NN lease, or "Net-Net" lease, which is pronounced "double net" where the "net" amounts generally are property tax and insurance. Double net leases, like triple net leases, are usually, though not always, single-tenant arrangements. However, the landlord carries some extra financial maintenance obligation. The term "Net Lease" is tossed around loosely in the net lease industry, often used when referring to a triple or double net lease; however, there is a definite distinction between a triple net and a double net lease even though some brokers erroneously use the term "Net Lease" to describe both. Double net leased investments generally trade at a slightly higher CAP rate than triple net leased investments because of the maintenance expenses which the landlord is responsible for. Brand new NN Deals with long-term builder warranties covering the roof and sometimes structure can be attractive to investors looking for a higher return.

== Risk ==
The largest risk associated with a NNN lease from a property owner’s perspective is the tenant terminating the lease early or failing to renew, which can result in loss. There are several factors used to determine the riskiness of a lease, including remaining term on the lease and creditworthiness of the tenant.

In one variation of a NNN lease contract, the "bondable NNN lease" (sometimes referred to as a "true triple net" or "absolute triple net" lease), the tenant cannot terminate the lease or seek any rent abatements under any circumstances, a provision that mitigates some of the risk for the landlord.

From a tenant’s perspective, a surge in local property taxes related to the value assessed of the property may make the lease unaffordable. In Nashville’s Lower Broadway entertainment district for example, taxes linked to the assessed value of the Acme Farm Supply Building increased property taxes by 365% in one year significantly impacting the tenant’s operating margins.

== Benefits ==
=== NNN lease ===
Investors can benefit from NNN lease properties in a variety of ways. In NNN leases, tenants take on the responsibility of major expenses, such as HVAC and roof repairs, keeping the operation cost lower for the landlord. Typically, NNN leases have lower rent per square foot rates which increases the tenant pool when a landlord is ready to lease the property. For specific tenants, landlords will frequently modify leases allowing for greater flexibility and higher tenant retention.

==== Absolute net lease ====
Most investors in today's net lease market prefer an investment that is truly passive; therefore, an absolute net lease is a requirement for many of these investors. Investors prefer to hold these assets long-term, which means there is likely some wear and tear maintenance, as well as a roof that will need to be replaced at some point. With an absolute net lease in, the risk of expenses associated with building maintenance shifts solely to the tenant, allowing the landlord to receive a 100% passive investment.

==== NNN 1031 exchange ====
In its simplest form, a 1031 exchange is a tax deferral strategy for real estate transactions in which a property owner or investor sells one property and purchases another within a specific time frame. The transaction, however, must qualify as a "like kind" exchange.

== Components and values of single-tenant leases ==
The value of a net leased investment is determined by the value of the real estate, the value of the credit tenant, and the value of the lease itself.

1. In a standard NNN leased investment the landlord owns the land and building while collecting rent from the tenant. If the tenant chooses to leave or the landlord decides he or she wants a different tenant when the lease term is up, he or she still owns the building and land. Planned developments in the area as well as current and future demographic trends all affect the real estate's value. The value of the physical building should also be factored in when determining the real estate's value.
2. The second determinant of value is the quality of the credit tenant. This is generally determined by the tenant's current credit rating and past financial reports. Most investors use the Standard and Poor's credit ratings. In order to qualify as an investment grade tenant, the company must be rated at lease BBB− by Standard and Poor's. Properties leased by credit tenants are in the highest demand and therefore command a lower capitalization rate than non-investment grade tenants.
3. The third determinant of value is the lease itself. NNN leases are more valuable than NN leases because the landlord is responsible for some of the expenses in a double net lease. The length of the lease is also a determinant of value (e.g., 20 years of guaranteed income will be worth more 10 or 15 year terms). Generous rental increases, also known as rent bumps, add value to the lease and protect the landlord against inflation. Some leases also have a percentage rent kick in if the tenant's gross sales hits a certain CAP. Most leases grant the tenant options to renew with several short term options putting the landlord in a weaker position when it comes time to renew the lease. If the current rents in the lease are below market, the landlord has the opportunity to command higher rents when the lease term is up.

== Net lease planning as an investment tool ==
NNN lease investments are essentially inflation-protected bonds guaranteed by a credit tenant, rather than a state or local municipality. The tenant makes monthly payments to the landlord, while the real estate (and often rent bumps called for in the lease) provides the investor protection against inflation. NNN lease investments provide similar tax advantages as tax-exempt municipal bonds without forcing the investor to settle for lower yields. If investors were to purchase a bond in the secondary market and sell it for a profit years later, they would have to pay a capital gains tax on the profit regardless of whether or not the bond is exempt from income tax. This is not the case when investing in NNN leases because, although structured like a bond, they are still considered real estate investments and therefore can be depreciated in the same manner as similar income producing commercial real estate. The taxes on the income they generate can be reduced or deferred over the life of the asset. Investors, of course, have to pay taxes on recaptured depreciation back when property is sold; however, this can be circumvented by utilizing a 1031 exchange by purchasing a like-kind property. NNN leased investments are also financeable, allowing the investor to leverage the credit of their tenant while also creating tax-deductible interest payments.

== See also ==
- Real Estate Investment Trust
