= Rental agreement =

Contract used in renting

A rental agreement is a contract of rental, usually written, between the owner of a property and a renter who desires to have temporary possession of the property; it is distinguished from a lease, which is more typically for a fixed term. As a minimum, the agreement identifies the parties, the property, the term of the rental, and the amount of rent for the term. The owner of the property may be referred to as the lessor and the renter as the lessee.

There is typically an implied, explicit, or written rental agreement or contract involved to specify the terms of the rental, which are regulated and managed under contract law. Examples include letting out real estate (real property) for the purpose of housing tenure (where the tenant rents a residence to live in), parking space for a vehicle(s), storage space, whole or portions of properties for business, agricultural, institutional, or government use, or other reasons.

== Real estate rental ==
When renting real estate, the person(s) or party who lives in or occupies the real estate is often called a tenant, paying rent to the owner of the property, often called a landlord (or landlady). The real estate rented may be all or part of almost any real estate, such as an apartment, house, building, business office(s) or suite, land, farm, or merely an inside or outside space to park a vehicle, or store things all under real estate law.

The tenancy agreement for real estate is often called a lease, and usually involves specific property rights in real property, as opposed to chattels. In addition to the basics of a rental (who, what, when, how much), a real estate rental may go into much more detail on these and other issues. The real estate may be rented for housing, parking a vehicle(s), storage, business, agricultural, institutional, or government use, or other reasons.

- Who: The parties involved in the contract, the lessor (sometimes called the owner or landlord) and the lessee (sometimes called the renter or tenant) are identified in the contract. A housing lease may specify whether the renter is living alone, with family, children, roommate, visitors. A rental may delineate the rights and obligations of each of these. For example, a "sub-let" to a stranger might not be permitted without permission of the landlord. This also applies to whether or not pets may be kept by the renter. On the other hand, the renter may also have specific rights against intrusions by the landlord (or other tenants), except under emergency circumstances. A renter is in possession of the property, and a landlord would be trespassing upon the renter's rights if entry is made without proper notice and authority (e.g., 24 hours' notice, daytime, knock first, except for emergency repairs, in case of fire, flood, etc.).
- What: Rented real estate may include all or part of almost any real property, such as an apartment, house, building, business office(s) or suite, land, farm, or merely an inside or outside space to park a vehicle, or store things. The premises rented may include not only specific rooms, but also access to other common areas such as off-street parking, basement or attic storage, laundry facility, pool, roof-deck, balconies, etc. The agreement may specify how and when these places may be used, and by whom. There may be detailed description of the current condition of the premises, for comparison with the condition at the time the premises are surrendered. Property may be rented furnished, unfurnished, or partly-furnished. Partly-furnished may mean that major appliances or "white goods" are made available but not tables and chairs.
- When: the term of the rental may be for a night (e.g., a hotel room), weeks, months, or years. There may be statutory provisions requiring registration of any rental that could extend for more than a specified number of years (e.g., seven) in order to be enforceable against a new landlord.

A typical rental is either annual or month-to-month, and the amount of rent may be different for long-term renters (because of lower turnover costs). Leaving a long-term lease before its expiration could result in penalties, or even the cost of the entire agreed period (if the landlord is unable to find a suitable replacement tenant after diligent pursuit). If a tenant stays beyond the end of a lease for a term of years (one or more), then the parties may agree that the lease will be automatically renewed, or it may simply convert to a tenancy at will (month-to-month) at the pro-rated monthly cost of the previous annual lease. If a tenant at will is given notice to quit the premises, and refuses to do so, the landlord then begins eviction proceedings. In many places it is completely illegal to change locks on doors, or remove personal belongings, let alone forcibly eject a person, without a court order of eviction. There may be strict rules of procedure, and stiff penalties (triple damages, plus attorneys' fees) for violations.

- How much: Rent may be payable monthly, annually, or in advance, or as otherwise agreed. A typical arrangement for tenancy at will is "first and last month's rent" plus a security deposit. The "last month's rent" is rent that has yet to be earned by the landlord. A rental agreement or lease may include a "rent review" clause which makes provision for the rental amount to be increased, the process for the landlord to provide notice of a rent increase and the options available to the tenant regarding acceptance or rejection of the proposed increase.

=== Deposit ===
The security deposit is often handled as an escrow deposit, owned by the tenant, but held by the landlord until the premises are surrendered in good condition (ordinary wear and tear excepted). In some states, the landlord must provide the tenant with the name and account number of the bank where the security deposit is held, and pay annual interest to the tenant. Other regulations may require the landlord to submit a list of pre-existing damage to the property, or forfeit the security deposit immediately (because there is no way to determine whether a prior tenant was responsible).

=== Insurance ===
In order to rent or lease in many apartment buildings, a renter (also referred to as a “lessee") is often required to provide proof of renters insurance before signing the rental agreement. There is a special type of the homeowners insurance in the United States specifically for renters — HO-4. This is commonly referred to as renter's insurance or renter's coverage. Similar to condominium coverage, referred to as a HO-6 policy, a renter's insurance policy covers those aspects of the apartment and its contents not specifically covered in the blanket policy written for the complex. This policy can also cover liabilities arising from accidents and intentional injuries for guests as well as passers-by up to 150' of the domicile. Renter's policies provide "named peril" coverage, meaning the policy states specifically what you are insured against. Common coverage areas are:

- Fire or Lightning
- Windstorm
- Smoke
- Vandalism or Malicious Mischief
- Theft
- Accidental Discharge of Water

Additional events including riot, aircraft, explosion, smoke, hail, falling objects, volcanic eruption, snow, sleet, and weight of ice may also be covered.

== Rental of personal property ==
The time use of a chattel or other so called "personal property" is covered under general contract law, but the term lease also nowadays extends to long term rental contracts of more expensive non-Real properties such as automobiles, boats, planes, office equipment and so forth. The distinction in that case is long term versus short term rentals. Some non-real properties commonly available for rent or lease are:

- motion pictures on VHS or DVD, of audio CDs, of computer programs on CD-ROM.
- transport equipment, such as an automobile or a bicycle.
- ships and boats, in which case rental is known as chartering, and the rent is known as hire or freight (depending on the type of charter)
- aircraft, in which case rental is known as chartering, or leasing if the rental is longer term
- specialized tools, such as a chainsaw, laptop, IT equipment or something more substantial, such as a forklift.
- large equipment such as cranes, oil rigs and submarines.
- a deckchair or beach chair and umbrella.
- furniture
- designer handbags, jewelry, sunglasses and watches.
- electrical items such as washing machines
- rental

In various degrees, renting can involve buying services for various amounts of time, such as staying in a hotel, using a computer in an Internet cafe, or riding in a taxicab (some forms of English use the term "hiring" for this activity).

As seen from the examples, some rented goods are used on the spot, but usually they are taken along; to help guarantee that they are brought back, one or more of the following applies:

- one shows an identity document
- one signs a contract; any damage already present when renting may be noted down to avoid that the renter is blamed for it when the good is returned
- one pays a damage deposit (a refundable fee that may be used in part to pay for damage caused by the renter)

If the customer has a credit account with the rental company, they may rent over several months (or years) and will receive a recurring or continuation invoice each rental period until they return the equipment. In this case deposits are rarely required.

In certain types of rental (sometimes known as operated or wet rental) the charge may be calculated by the rental charge + timesheets of operators or drivers supplied by the rental company to operate the equipment. This is particularly relevant for crane rental companies.

Sometimes the risk that the good is kept is reduced by it being a special model or having signs on it that cannot easily be removed, making it obvious that it is owned by the rental company; this is especially effective for goods used in public places, but even when used at home it may help due to social control.

Persons and businesses that regularly rent goods from a particular company generally have an account with that company, which reduces the administrative procedure (transaction costs) on each occasion.

Signing out books from a library could be considered renting when there is a fee per book. However the term lending is more common.

=== Car rental ===
In addition to the above, a car rental agreement may include various restrictions on the way a renter can use a car, and the condition in which it must be returned. For example, some rentals cannot be driven off-road, or out of the country, or towing a trailer, without specific permission. In New Zealand you may have to specifically endorse a promise that the car will not be driven onto Ninety-mile Beach (because of the hazardous tides).

There will certainly be a requirement to show a driver's license, and only those drivers appearing on the contract may be authorized to drive. It may include an option to purchase auto insurance (motor insurance, UK), if the renter does not already have a policy to cover rentals—another important consideration for multiple drivers. Some agencies may even require a bond payable if the car is not returned in order, often held in the form of a credit-card authorization—voided if the car is returned per agreement. Renters should be advised about their responsibility for any parking or traffic violations incurred upon the vehicle during the rental period. There should also be advice on handling thefts, accidents, break-downs, and towing.

Further terms may include added fees for late returns, drop-off at a different location, or failure to top up the petrol immediately before the return.

Finally, there may be provisions for making a non-refundable deposit with a booking, terms for payment of the initial period (with discounts, vouchers, etc.), extended periods, and any damages or other fees that accrue prior to the return.

== Specific jurisdictions ==
=== India ===
In India, the rental income on property is taxed under the head "income from house property". A deduction of 30% is allowed from total rent which is charged to tax.

=== Italy ===
Italian rental agreements on real estate properties are not uniquely regulated by the written pact agreed by the owner and the tenant. Italian civil law requires a correspondence between the destination of use (e.g. residential, commercial activity) agreed by the contractual parties and the effective destination of use adopted by the tenant after his take of possession of the property. In case of relevant differences, the owner has the faculty to resolve the contract for grave non-fulfillment.

If the owner does not opt for the express resolutive option established by law or by the contract, the contract remains in force and the civil judge is entitled by law to appreciate the effective use of the real estate, as well as the awareness and implicit tolerance manifested by the owner (in absence of any resolutive action taken with regard to the contract). The judge is entitled to determinate the new contractual agreement, making its clauses compliant with the effective destination of use of the property. The new import of the contractual obligation (the annual rent) is usually recalculated in application of standard contracts defined by the association of the real estates' owners and lessees, both at a national and at a provincial level.

=== United States ===
In New York City, rental agreements may contain a good guy clause provision.

== See also ==
- Leasehold estate
- Leasing
- Renting
