= Washington Treaty on Intellectual Property in Respect of Integrated Circuits =

1989 international treaty

Washington Convention
Washington Treaty on Intellectual Property in Respect of Integrated Circuits
- Signed: May 26, 1989
- Location: Washington, DC, US
- Parties: 10
- Depositary: Director General of the World Intellectual Property Organization
- Languages: English, Arabic, Chinese, French, Russian and Spanish

The Washington Treaty on Intellectual Property in Respect of Integrated Circuits was adopted on 26 May 1989, by the Diplomatic Conference convened for that purpose under the auspices of the WIPO in Washington, DC. 73 states, the European communities and a variety of intergovernmental and non-governmental organizations were represented at the conference.

It provides protection for the layout designs (topographies) of integrated circuits. The Treaty has not yet entered into force because it lacks the required number of ratifications; however, it has been ratified or acceded to by Bosnia and Herzegovina (2007), Egypt (1990), and Saint Lucia (2000).

== Contracting Parties ==
Member	Signature	Instrument
Bosnia and Herzegovina	—	Accession: March 8, 2007
China	May 1, 1990	—
Egypt	December 5, 1989	Ratification: July 26, 1990
Ghana	May 26, 1989	—
Guatemala	May 31, 1989	—
India	May 25, 1990	—
Liberia	May 26, 1989	—
Saint Lucia	—	Accession: December 18, 2000
Serbia	May 26, 1989	—
Zambia	May 26, 1989	—
