= Leasing commission =

Fee paid to a broker for securing a commercial real estate tenant

A leasing commission (LC) is a fee paid by a commercial real estate landlord to a real estate broker in exchange for procuring a tenant who successfully executes a lease for the landlord's property. Leasing commissions are the primary form of compensation in commercial real estate brokerage and are typically calculated as a percentage of the total rent to be paid over the lease term, or as a flat fee per square foot of leased space.

Leasing commissions are most common in office, retail, and industrial leasing transactions. They are typically negotiated between the landlord and the listing broker prior to marketing a space, and are documented in a listing agreement or exclusive leasing agency agreement.

== Structure and calculation ==
Leasing commissions are calculated using one of several conventions depending on market, property type, and transaction size.

=== Percentage of total lease value ===
The most common structure in U.S. commercial markets calculates the commission as a percentage of the aggregate base rent payable over the full lease term:

$$\text{LC} = \text{Annual Base Rent} \times \text{Lease Term (years)} \times \text{Commission Rate}$$

Commission rates typically range from 3% to 6% of total lease value, with higher rates applied to shorter leases or smaller transactions where the absolute dollar commission would otherwise be insufficient to compensate the broker for time expended.

Example: A tenant signs a 5-year lease at $50,000 per year in annual base rent. At a 4% commission rate:

$$\text{LC} = \$50{,}000 \times 5 \times 0.04 = \$10{,}000$$

=== Flat fee per square foot ===
Some markets — particularly for industrial and large-format retail leasing — calculate commissions as a flat dollar amount per square foot of leased area, multiplied by the lease term in years. This structure is common in markets where lease rates are low per square foot but space sizes are large.

=== Declining schedule ===
For long-term leases, many markets apply a declining commission schedule that pays a higher percentage on early lease years and a lower percentage on later years. A typical declining schedule might apply a 6% rate on years one through five and a 3% rate on years six through ten. This structure reflects the time value of money and the fact that the broker's work is concentrated at lease execution rather than distributed across the full term.

== Payment timing ==
Leasing commissions are typically paid by the landlord at one of the following points:

- At lease execution — the full commission is paid when the lease is signed, regardless of when the tenant takes occupancy
- At rent commencement — payment is deferred until the tenant begins paying rent, protecting the landlord against a tenant who executes a lease but never occupies
- In installments — the commission is split between lease execution and rent commencement, or paid in tranches over the first several months of the lease

Commission advance facilities offered by specialty finance companies allow brokers to receive the present value of a future commission stream immediately upon lease execution, at a discount, rather than waiting for installment payments.

== Cooperating broker splits ==
In most commercial leasing transactions, two brokers are involved:

- The listing broker (also called the landlord's broker or leasing agent) — retained by the landlord under a listing agreement to market the space and represent the landlord's interests
- The tenant representative broker (also called the tenant's broker or tenant rep) — retained by the tenant, sometimes under an exclusive tenant representation agreement, to identify suitable spaces and negotiate lease terms on the tenant's behalf

The total leasing commission is paid by the landlord to the listing broker, who then splits a portion of the commission with the tenant representative broker according to the terms of the listing agreement or a cooperating broker agreement. A standard split is 50/50, though splits of 60/40 or other ratios are common depending on the transaction and the relative contribution of each broker.

In some transactions — particularly renewals and expansions by existing tenants — no tenant representative broker is involved, and the listing broker retains the full commission.

== Renewal and expansion commissions ==
Leasing commissions are payable not only on new leases but also on lease renewals and expansions, though typically at a reduced rate. Renewal commissions commonly range from 1% to 3% of the renewal term's aggregate rent, reflecting the reduced marketing effort required to retain an existing tenant compared to procuring a new one.

Lease agreements frequently include provisions specifying whether and at what rate a commission is payable upon exercise of a renewal option, expansion option, or right of first refusal.

== Relationship to tenant inducements ==
Leasing commissions are closely associated with tenant inducements (TIs) — landlord expenditures made to attract or retain tenants, including tenant improvement allowances, free rent periods, and moving allowances. Both leasing commissions and tenant inducements represent direct costs incurred by the landlord to generate or maintain occupancy revenue.

In commercial real estate bookkeeping and financial reporting, leasing commissions and tenant inducements are commonly grouped together as a single cost-of-business line item, frequently referenced as "TIs and LCs." Both are typically capitalized on the landlord's balance sheet and amortized over the lease term for accounting purposes under Generally Accepted Accounting Principles (GAAP) and IFRS 16.

== Accounting treatment ==
Under U.S. Generally Accepted Accounting Principles (GAAP), leasing commissions paid by a landlord are treated as deferred costs — capitalized as an asset on the balance sheet and amortized on a straight-line basis over the term of the lease to which they relate. If a lease is terminated early, the unamortized balance of the leasing commission is expensed immediately in the period of termination.

For income tax purposes, leasing commissions may be deductible as ordinary and necessary business expenses, though the specific treatment depends on the taxpayer's accounting method and applicable tax regulations.

== See also ==
- Tenant inducement
- Commercial real estate
- Lease
- Real estate broker
- Tenant improvement
- Listing agreement
- Good guy clause
