= Industrial property =

Intellectual property applied to industry

Industrial property is one of two subsets of intellectual property (the other being copyright), it takes a range of forms, including patents for inventions, industrial designs (aesthetic creations related to the appearance of industrial products), trademarks, service marks, layout-designs of integrated circuits, commercial names and designations, geographical indications and protection against unfair competition. In some cases, aspects of intellectual creation, although present, are less clearly defined. The object of industrial property consists of signs conveying information, in particular to consumers, regarding products and services offered on the market. Protection is directed against unauthorized use of such signs that could mislead consumers, and against misleading practices in general.

In United States legal terminology, industrial property refers to patented goods, trademarks, copyrights, and industrial designs that are owned by a business, and that the business may exclude others from using.

== History and context ==
=== Early patents ===
The earliest patents were recognitions for exclusive exploitation or exclusive practice of new processes or creations; which are considered to have been granted in Europe in the fourteenth century. Several possible origins are attributed to the first patents: the Republic of Florence, the Republic of Venice or, according to some authors, the Kingdom of England. In all cases the main motivations seem to have been the introduction of "new arts", the attraction of more skilled craftsmen and the transfer of technology in order to reduce imports and increase the exports of their territories.

The industrial property researcher Maximilian Frumkin considers that the first invention patent was granted in Florence in 1421 to the famous architect Filippo Brunelleschi, to whom the Florentine state granted an exclusive right, with a duration of three years, to build and use an apparatus of his invention to transport heavy loads on the Arno and other rivers, excluding any other person from such uses under penalty of burning any invention other than the architect's in case of contradiction of the prohibition. The invention was a boat intended to transport the marble needed for the construction of the dome of the Florence Cathedral, Brunelleschi's greatest work. In practice, the boat was not built until 1427 and was known as "Il Badalone."

Later, during sixteenth century, the patent history had a new development with the recognition given by queen Elizabeth I to the inventor Jacobus Acontius, who asked for a prohibition against any use of his invention but founding his petition on his "rights and labors," providing a shift in the recognition of industrial property as a kind of natural right.

=== Modern age ===
Industrial property is not rigidly defined; it is a portion of the superordinate concept of intellectual property (intangible property) that excludes copyright. The purpose of industrial property law is to regulate the rights to certain inventions and industrial or commercial creations. It is regulated on a state, community and international level.

The importance of protecting industrial property was recognized in the Paris Convention for the Protection of Industrial Property in 1883 and the Berne Convention for the Protection of Literary and Artistic Works in 1886. Both treaties are administered by the World Intellectual Property Organization.

The Convention Establishing the World Intellectual Property Organization (1967) does not seek to define intellectual property, but lists the following as protected by IP rights:

- literary, artistic and scientific works;
- performances of performing artists, phonograms and broadcasts;
- inventions in all fields of human endeavor;
- scientific discoveries;
- industrial designs;
- trademarks, service marks, and commercial names and designations;
- protection against unfair competition;
- and “all other rights resulting from intellectual activity in the industrial, scientific, literary or artistic fields.”

The TRIPS Agreement, adopted in 1995, requires to World Trade Organization members to provide protection and recognition to trademarks (including service marks); geographical indications (including appellations of origin); industrial designs; patents (including the protection of new varieties of plants); the layout-designs of integrated circuits; and undisclosed information including trade secrets and test data.

Other international instruments have created systems of international registration for industrial property signs, such as the Lisbon Agreement (1958) and the Madrid Protocol (1989), both administered by the World Intellectual Property Organization.

Countries generally have laws to protect IP for two main reasons:

1. To give statutory expression to the rights of creators and innovators in their creations and innovations, balanced against the public interest in accessing creations and innovations;
2. To promote creativity and innovation, so contributing to economic and social development.

== Patents for invention ==
Patents, also referred to as patents for invention, are the most widespread means of protecting technical inventions. The patent system is designed to contribute to the promotion of innovation and the transfer and dissemination of technology, to the mutual advantage of inventors, users of inventions and the general public. Once a patent is granted by a state or by a regional office acting for several states, the owner of a patent has the right to prevent anyone else from commercially exploiting the invention for a limited period, generally 20 years. The patent applicant must disclose the invention in order to obtain protection, and their rights can be enforced only within the territory in which the patent was granted.

=== Definitions ===
Most laws dealing with the protection of inventions do not actually define what an invention is. A number of countries, however, define inventions as new solutions to technical problems. The problem may be old or new, but the solution, in order to be considered an invention, must be a new one. Merely discovering something that already exists in nature will not generally qualify as an invention; an adequate amount of human ingenuity, creativity and inventiveness must be involved. But an invention need not be technically complex: the safety pin was an invention that solved a “technical” problem.

=== Exclusive rights ===
By granting an exclusive right, patents provide incentives, offering inventors recognition for their creativity and material reward for their marketable inventions. These incentives encourage innovation, which in turn contributes to continued enhancement of the quality of life. In return for the exclusive right, the inventor must adequately disclose the patented invention to the public, so that others have access to the new knowledge, leading to further innovation. The disclosure of the invention is thus an essential consideration in any patent granting procedure. The word “patent”, or “letters patent”, also denotes the document issued by the relevant government authority. In order to obtain a patent for an invention, the inventor, or often the inventor's employer, submits an application to the national or regional patent office concerned. In the application, the applicant must describe the invention in detail and compare it with previous existing technologies in the same field in order to demonstrate that it is new.

=== Patentability ===
Not all inventions are patentable. Patent laws generally require that an invention fulfill the following conditions, known as the requirements or conditions of patentability:

- Patentable subject matter: The invention must fall within the scope of patentable subject matter as defined by national law. This varies from one country to another. Many countries exclude from patentability such subject matter as scientific theories, mathematical methods, plant or animal varieties, discoveries of natural substances, methods for medical treatment (as opposed to medical products), and any invention where prevention of commercial exploitation is necessary to protect public order, morality or public health.
- Industrial applicability (utility): The invention must be of practical use, or capable of some kind of industrial application.
- Novelty: The invention must show some new characteristic that is not known in the body of existing knowledge (referred to as prior art) in its technical field.
- Inventive step (non-obviousness): The invention must show an inventive step that could not be deduced by a person with average knowledge of the technical field.
- Disclosure of the invention: The invention must be disclosed in a clear and complete manner in the patent application to be carried out by a person skilled in the art (a person conversant in the field of technology concerned).

The conditions of novelty and inventive step must be fulfilled by a certain date, generally the date on which the application is filed. An exception to this rule, covered by an applicant's right of priority, is regulated by the Paris Convention. The right of priority means that, having filed an application in one member country of the Paris Convention, the same applicant (or their successor in title) may, within a specified time period, apply for protection for the same invention in any of the other member countries. These subsequent applications will not be invalidated by reason of any acts occurred between the filing date of the earliest application and the subsequent applications.

For example, if an inventor first files an application for patent protection in Japan, and later a second application, with respect to the same invention, in France, it is sufficient that the conditions of novelty and non-obviousness existed at the date on which the Japanese application was filed. In other words, the later, French application retains priority over any applications relating to the same invention filed by other applicants between the date of the inventor's first and second application. This is subject to the period between the two dates not exceeding 12 months.

== Utility models ==
Although not as widespread as patents, utility models are also used to protect inventions. The rights conferred by utility models are similar to patent rights. Utility models are found in the laws of more than 50 countries, as well as in the regional agreements of the African Regional Intellectual Property Organization (ARIPO) and the African Intellectual Property Organization (OAPI). In addition, certain countries, such as Australia and Malaysia, provide for titles of protection called innovation patents or utility innovations which are similar to utility models. Other countries, like Ireland and Slovenia, have a short-term patent equivalent to the utility model. The expression “utility model” refers to a title of protection for certain inventions, such as inventions in the mechanical field.

Utility model protection is usually sought for technically less complex inventions or for inventions that have a short commercial life. The procedure for obtaining protection for a utility model is usually simpler than that for seeking patent protection. Substantive and procedural requirements under the applicable laws vary widely among the countries and regions with a utility model system; however, utility models usually differ from patents for invention in the following main respects:

- The requirements for acquiring a utility model are less stringent than for patents. While the “novelty” requirement must always be met, that of “inventive step” (or “non-obviousness”) may be much less evident or absent altogether. In practice, protection for utility models is often sought for innovations of an incremental nature that may not meet patentability criteria.
- The maximum term of protection provided for by law for a utility model is generally shorter than that provided for a patent for invention, usually between 7 and 10 years.
- The fees required for obtaining and maintaining the right are generally lower than those for patents.

== Industrial designs ==
Industrial designs are applied to a wide variety of industrial products and handicrafts. They refer to the ornamental or aesthetic aspects of an article, including compositions of lines or colors or any three-dimensional forms that give a special appearance to a product or handicraft. The design must have aesthetic appeal. Moreover, it must be able to be reproduced by industrial means; this is the essential purpose of the design and the reason the design is called “industrial”. In a legal sense, an industrial design refers to the right granted in many countries, pursuant to a registration system, to protect the original, ornamental and nonfunctional features of a product resulting from design activity. Aesthetic appeal is one of the main factors influencing consumers in their product choice. Where the technical performance of a product offered by different manufacturers is relatively similar, consumers will make their selection based on price and aesthetic appeal.

=== Aims of industrial design protection ===
By rewarding creators for their efforts, industrial design protection also serves as an incentive to invest in design activity. One of the basic aims of industrial design protection is to stimulate the design element of production. Industrial design laws therefore usually only protect designs that can be used in industry, or that can be produced on a large scale. This condition of industrial production is a notable difference between industrial design protection and copyright, since the latter concerns only aesthetic creations. However, in some cases, industrial designs may qualify for protection under copyright, for example where the design can be categorized as a work of applied art.

=== Originality ===
Industrial designs can generally be protected if they are new or original. Designs may not meet these criteria if they do not differ significantly from other existing designs or combinations thereof. In most industrial design laws, designs dictated solely by the article's function are excluded from protection. If the design for an article produced by many manufacturers, such as a screw, were to be dictated purely by the function the screw was intended to perform, then protection for that design would have the effect of excluding all other manufacturers from producing items intended to perform the same function. Such exclusion is not warranted unless the design is sufficiently novel and inventive to qualify for patent protection. In other words, the legal protection offered by industrial designs concerns only the design that is applied to, or embodied in, articles or products. This protection does not prevent other manufacturers from producing or dealing in similar articles or products, as long as these do not embody or reproduce the protected design.

=== Protections ===
Industrial design registration protects against unauthorized exploitation of the design in industrial articles. It grants the owner of the design the exclusive right to make, import, sell, hire or offer for sale articles to which the design is applied or in which the design is embodied. The term for an industrial design right varies from country to country. The usual maximum term is from 10 to 25 years, often divided into terms requiring the proprietor to renew the registration in order to obtain an extension of protection. The relatively short period of protection may be related to the association of designs with more general styles of fashion, which tend to enjoy somewhat transient acceptance or success, particularly in highly fashion-conscious areas such as clothing or footwear.

== Integrated circuits ==
Although prefabricated components of electrical circuitry have been used in the manufacture of electrical equipment (e.g. radios) for some time, large-scale integration of a multitude of electrical functions in a very small component became possible as a result of advances in semiconductor technology. Integrated circuits are manufactured in accordance with very detailed plans or layout-designs. The layout-designs of integrated circuits are creations of the human mind. They are usually the result of vast investment, in terms both of expertise and financial resources. There is a continuing need for the creation of new layout-designs that simultaneously reduce the dimensions of existing integrated circuits and increase their functions. The smaller an integrated circuit, the less material is needed for its manufacture, and the smaller the space needed to accommodate it. Integrated circuits are used in a wide range of products, including articles of everyday use such as watches, televisions, washing machine sand cars, as well as sophisticated computers and servers.

Although creating a new layout-design for an integrated circuit involves a major investment, it is possible to copy layout designs for a fraction of that cost. Copying may be done by photographing each layer of an integrated circuit and preparing masks for the production of the integrated circuit on the basis of those photographs. The high cost of creating layout-designs and the relative ease of copying them are the main reasons they need protection.

Layout-designs of integrated circuits are not considered industrial designs in the sense described in the laws providing for the registration of industrial designs. This is because they do not determine the external appearance of integrated circuits but rather the physical location, within the integrated circuit, of each element having an electronic function. Moreover, layout-designs of integrated circuits are not normally patentable inventions, because their creation usually does not involve an inventive step – even though it requires a great deal of work by an expert. Furthermore, copyright protection may not apply if national law determines that layout-designs cannot be copyrighted. In response to the uncertainty surrounding the protection of layout-designs, the WIPO Treaty on Intellectual Property in Respect of Integrated Circuits was adopted on May 26, 1989. The Treaty has not entered into force; however, its substantive provisions have, to a large extent, been incorporated by reference in the Agreement on Trade-Related Aspects of Intellectual Property Rights (TRIPS Agreement), concluded in 1994.

== Trademarks ==
A trademark is a sign, or a combination of signs, that distinguishes the goods or services of one company from those of another. Such signs may use words, letters, numerals, pictures, shapes and colors, or any combination thereof. An increasing number of countries also allow for the registration of less traditional forms of trademarks, such as three-dimensional signs (like the Coca-Cola bottle or Toblerone chocolate bar), audible signs (sounds such as the roar of the lion at the beginning of films produced by MGM), or olfactory signs (such as the smell of a particular type of motor oil or embroidery yarn). However, many countries have set limits on what may be registered as a trademark, generally allowing only signs that are visually perceptible or can be represented graphically. Trademarks are used on goods or in connection with the marketing of goods or services. The trademark may appear not only on the goods themselves but also on the container or packaging in which the goods are marketed. When used in connection with the sale of goods or services, the sign may appear in advertisements, for example in newspapers, on television or in shop windows.

=== Functions of trademarks ===
Broadly speaking, trademarks perform four main functions:

- Distinguish the products or services of one company from those of other companies. Trademarks facilitate the choices consumers make when buying certain products or using certain services. The trademark helps consumers to identify a product or service they are already familiar with or one that has been advertised. The distinctive character of a mark must be evaluated in relation to the goods or services to which the mark is applied. For example, the word “apple” or the image of an apple cannot distinguish apples, but it is distinctive for computers. Trademarks not only distinguish products or services; they also distinguish them in relation to the company offering the products or services.
- Refer to a particular company, not necessarily known to the consumer, that offers the products or services on the market. Trademarks therefore distinguish products or services from a given source from identical or similar products or services from other sources. This function is important in defining the scope of trademark protection.
- Refer to a particular quality of the product or service for which a mark is used, so that consumers can rely on the consistent quality of the goods or services offered under that mark. This function is commonly referred to as the guarantee function of trademarks. A trademark is not always used by only one company, since the trademark owner may grant licenses to other companies to use the trademark. Moreover, companies often use trademarks for products they acquire from various sources in the course of business. In such cases, trademark owners are not responsible for producing the products, but instead (and this may be equally important) for selecting those that meet their quality standards and requirements. Even when trademark owners manufacture a particular product, they may use parts they selected but did not produce.
- Promote the marketing and sale of products, and the marketing and provision of services. Trademarks are not only used to distinguish or refer to a particular company or quality, but also to stimulate sales. A trademark used in this way must be carefully selected. It must appeal to the consumer, create interest, and inspire confidence. This is sometimes called the communication function. The owner of a registered trademark has an exclusive right in respect of the mark: the right to use the mark and to prevent unauthorized third parties from using it, or a confusingly similar mark, so as to prevent consumers and the public in general from being misled. The period of protection varies, but a trademark can be renewed indefinitely on payment of the necessary fees, provided the mark is used. Trademark protection is enforced by the courts, which, in most systems, have the authority to block trademark infringement.

== Trade names ==
Another category of industrial property covers commercial names and designations. A commercial or trade name is the name or designation that identifies a company. In most countries, trade names may be registered with a government authority. However, under Article 8 of the Paris Convention, a trade name must be protected without the obligation of filing or registration, whether or not it forms part of a trademark. Protection generally means that the trade name of one company may not be used by another company, either as a trade name or a trade or service mark – and that a name or designation similar to the trade name may not be used by another company if it is likely to mislead the public.

== Geographical indications ==
A geographical indication is a sign used on goods that have a specific geographical origin and possess qualities or a reputation due to that place of origin. Agricultural products typically have qualities deriving from their place of production and that are influenced by specific local factors, such as climate and soil. Whether a sign functions as an indication is a matter of national law and consumer perception. Geographical indications may be used for a wide variety of agricultural products, such as “Tuscany” for olive oil produced in a specific area of Italy, or “Roquefort” for cheese produced in a certain region of France.

The use of geographical indications is not limited to agricultural products. They may also highlight particular qualities of a product that are due to human factors found in the product's place of origin, such as specific manufacturing skills and traditions. That place of origin may be a village or town, a region or a country. An example of a country geographical indication is “Switzerland” or “Swiss” for products made in Switzerland, in particular watches.

An appellation of origin is a special kind of geographical indication used on products that have a specific quality exclusively or essentially due to the geographical environment in which the products are produced. The term geographical indication encompasses appellations of origin. Examples of appellations of origin protected in states party to the Lisbon Agreement for the Protection of Appellations of Origin and their International Registration are “Habana”, for tobacco grown in the Havana region of Cuba, and “Tequila”, for spirits produced in particular areas of Mexico.

=== Protections ===
Geographical indications are protected in accordance with national laws in a wide range of ways, such as under laws against unfair competition, consumer protection laws, laws for the protection of certification marks or special laws for the protection of geographical indications or appellations of origin. In essence, unauthorized parties may not use geographical indications where that use is likely to mislead the public as to the true origin of the product. Applicable sanctions range from court injunctions preventing unauthorized use to the payment of damages and fines or, in serious cases, imprisonment.

The World Intellectual Property Organization is an international organization dedicated to ensuring that the rights of creators and owners of intellectual property are protected worldwide, and that inventors and authors are recognized and rewarded. As a specialized agency of the United Nations, the organization provides a forum for its member states to create and harmonize rules and practices for protecting intellectual property rights. Most developed countries have protection systems that are centuries old, while developing countries continue to create legal and administrative frameworks to protect their patents, trademarks, designs and copyright.

== Protection against unfair competition ==
Article 10 bis of the Paris Convention requires member countries to provide for protection against unfair competition. According to this article, the following acts of competition are considered contrary to honest trade and industry practices:

- All acts of such a nature as to create confusion with the establishment, the goods or the industrial or commercial activities of a competitor;
- False allegations in the course of trade of such a nature as to discredit the establishment, the goods or the industrial or commercial activities of a competitor; and
- Indications or allegations, the use of which in the course of trade are liable to mislead the public as to the characteristics of certain goods.

Protection against unfair competition supplements the protection of inventions, industrial designs, trademarks and geographical indications. It is particularly important for the protection of knowledge, technology or information that is not protected by a patent but that may be required in order to make best use of a patented invention.

== Instruments and international agreements ==
Instruments of protection	What they protect	Relevant international agreements	Year	Administered by
Patents and utility models	Inventions	Paris Convention for the Protection of Industrial Property	1883	WIPO
Patents and utility models	Inventions	Patent Cooperation Treaty	1970	WIPO
Patents and utility models	Inventions	Budapest Treaty on the International Recognition of the Deposit of Microorganisms for the Purposes of Patent Procedure	1977	WIPO
Patents and utility models	Inventions	Strasbourg Agreement Concerning the International Patent Classification	1971	WIPO
Patents and utility models	Inventions	Patent Law Treaty	2000	WIPO
Industrial designs	Independently created industrial designs that are new or original	Hague Agreement Concerning the International Registration of Industrial Designs	1925	WIPO
Industrial designs	Independently created industrial designs that are new or original	Locarno Agreement Establishing an International Classification for Industrial Designs	1968	WIPO
Trademarks, certification marks and collective marks	Distinguishing signs and symbols	Madrid Agreement for the Repression of False or Deceptive Indications of Source on Goods	1891	WIPO
Trademarks, certification marks and collective marks	Distinguishing signs and symbols	Madrid Agreement Concerning the International Registration of Marks	1891	WIPO
Trademarks, certification marks and collective marks	Distinguishing signs and symbols	Protocol Relating to the Madrid Agreement Concerning the International Registration of Marks	1989	WIPO
Trademarks, certification marks and collective marks	Distinguishing signs and symbols	Nice Agreement Concerning the International Classification of Goods and Services for the Purposes of the Registration of Marks	1957	WIPO
Trademarks, certification marks and collective marks	Distinguishing signs and symbols	Vienna Agreement Establishing an International Classification of the Figurative Elements of Marks	1973	WIPO
Trademarks, certification marks and collective marks	Distinguishing signs and symbols	Trademark Law Treaty	1994	WIPO
Trademarks, certification marks and collective marks	Distinguishing signs and symbols	Singapore Treaty on the Law of Trademarks	2006	WIPO
Geographical indications and appellations of origin	Geographical names linked to a country, region or locality	Lisbon Agreement for the Protection of Appellations of Origin and their International Registration	1958	WIPO
Integrated circuits	Layout-designs	Washington Treaty on Intellectual Property in Respect of Integrated Circuits	1989	WIPO
Protection against unfair competition	Honest practices	Paris Convention for the Protection of Industrial Property	1883	WIPO

== See also ==
- Intellectual property organization
- Glossary of patent law terms

== Sources ==
This article incorporates text from a free content work. Licensed under CC-BY-SA IGO 3.0 (license statement/permission). Text taken from Understanding Copyright and Related Rights, 5, WIPO. This article incorporates text from a free content work. Licensed under CC-BY-SA IGO 3.0 (license statement/permission). Text taken from Understanding Industrial Property, WIPO.
