= Discount rate =

Discount rate may refer to:

- Social discount rate (of consumption), the rate at which the weight given to future consumption decreases in economic models
- Pure time preference, or utility discount rate, the rate at which the weight given to future utility decreases in economic models
- Annual effective discount rate, an alternative measure of interest rates to the standard Annual Percentage Rate
- Bank rate, the rate of interest a central bank charges on its loans to commercial banks
- Discount yield, a rate used in calculating cash flows
- Fees and other charges associated with merchant accounts.
