= Reserves for common-interest developments =

Funds for a common-interest development

Reserves for common-interest developments are funds (reserves) collected for the long-term maintenance or replacements of the common areas in a common-interest development (CID). The funds accumulate until they are needed for such.

In a common-interest development, the funds are managed through a board of directors (BOD) elected by the homeowners' association (HOA) from the existing owners. The board performs its duties based upon the covenants, conditions, and restrictions (CC&Rs). As outlined in the CC&Rs the board is responsible for producing budgets for the maintenance fees to be assessed to the owners.

A reserve study is a coordinated effort between HOA management, BOD, contractors/vendors, interior designers, architects, engineers, accountants, investment counselors and sometimes lenders for producing an overall reserve plan. The process begins with the identification of the individual common area items (or reserve items) which need to be reserved for in the reserve study analysis.

There is a standardized four-part test for determining if an asset is appropriate for reserve designation:

1. The asset must be a common area maintenance responsibility
2. The asset must have a useful life
3. The asset must have a predictable remaining useful life
4. The asset must be above a minimum threshold cost

Once the reserve items have been identified and established as the reserve component list, the following information will then be determined for each item by the professionals outlined above:

1. Project description (e.g. "fence - paint" or "fence - replace")
2. Description/quantity
3. Useful life
4. Remaining useful life
5. Current replacement cost

Additional useful information such as:

1. Cost basis (current cost by square yards, linear feet, each, etc.)
2. Freight and labor (costs to receive and install)
3. Salvage (estimated value of the item when replaced, if any)
4. Date placed in service or the date last maintained or replaced

From this a reserve financial plan and budget is created to determine the amount to be assessed to the owners in their maintenance fees.

Since the governing body is charged with the responsibility of maintaining and protecting the association's assets, it is important that cash reserves are available in case major repairs or replacements are needed. The most equitable way is a process whereby financial assets (reserve funds) accumulate over time as physical assets (fixed components) wear out.

Insufficient funding of reserves could lead to financial difficulties for the association. Major repairs and unexpected expenses may not be covered, putting a burden on homeowners. A lack of reserve funds could result in the imposition of special assessments or loans, which would affect the financial stability of the community and property values.

One of the toughest challenges for reserve (fund and facility) analysis and reporting has always been the timeshare/shared ownership/vacation rental industry. Typically, nearly two-thirds of the total replacement/maintenance costs for a particular property are associated with apartment interiors, with the remainder for common area facilities. It is critical for reserve advisors to plan ahead for most estates of this type, or the process can become unmanageable.

All associations, regardless of size, must prepare a reserve study, unless the total replacement cost is less than 50% of the association's gross budget, excluding the association's reserve account for the period. The reserve fund is for the repair, replacement, restoration, or maintenance of major components of the general area.
