= Additional rent =

Additional rent is a term used in commercial real estate to describe a variety of rent-like cash flows from tenants that are not part of the traditional base rent. In retail settings, especially shopping malls, these often include percentage rent and various recoverable expenses.

Common forms of additional rent include operating expenses, property taxes, and insurance costs, which are passed through to tenants under a net lease structure. In a triple net lease (NNN), the tenant is responsible for all three categories of additional rent on top of the base rent, making it a widely used structure for single-tenant commercial properties. Additional rent clauses are typically defined in the lease agreement and may be subject to annual reconciliation, where estimated payments made throughout the year are adjusted against actual costs incurred by the landlord.
