= Percentage rent =

Commercial lease structure where rent is tied to tenant gross income

Percentage rent, or a percentage lease, is a type of lease used in commercial real estate in which the rental charge is based partly or wholly on the gross income of the tenant, rather than a fixed monthly or annual value. Percent rent is classified as an additional rent term and is most prevalent in retail leasing.

== Structure ==
In a standard percentage lease, the tenant pays a base rent — a fixed minimum — plus a percentage of gross sales above a threshold known as the breakpoint. The percentage component only activates once the tenant's income exceeds that threshold.

Some leases are purely percentage-based with no base rent component, though such structures are uncommon and typically limited to short-term or pop-up retail arrangements.

== Breakpoint calculation ==
There are two types of breakpoints:

=== Natural breakpoint ===
The natural breakpoint is derived mathematically from the base rent and percentage rate:

$$\text{Natural Breakpoint} = \frac{\text{Annual Base Rent}}{\text{Percentage Rate}}$$

Example:

- Base rent: $1,000/month ($12,000/year)
- Percentage rate: 5%
- Natural breakpoint: $12,000 ÷ 5% = $240,000

The tenant pays only base rent until annual gross income exceeds $240,000. Above that threshold, percentage rent applies only to the excess:

$$\text{Percentage Rent} = (\text{Gross Income} - \text{Breakpoint}) \times \text{Rate}$$

If annual income is $260,000:

($260,000 − $240,000) × 5% = $1,000 percentage rent
Total annual rent = $12,000 + $1,000 = $13,000

=== Artificial breakpoint ===
An artificial breakpoint is a negotiated threshold that differs from the natural breakpoint. It may be set higher (benefiting the tenant) or lower (benefiting the landlord) depending on the lease negotiation and the landlord's assessment of the tenant's sales potential.

== Common use cases ==
=== Retail and seasonal businesses ===
Percentage leases are common in shopping mall and strip mall retail settings where monthly income is highly variable. Many retailers generate the majority of annual revenue during the holiday shopping season. In such cases, a landlord may offer a base rent below fair market value — within the tenant's capacity during slower periods — and recover potential losses through the percentage component during peak months. For the tenant, rent scales with revenue, reducing fixed cost exposure during low-sales periods.

=== New or startup tenants ===
Percentage leases are also used for new tenants occupying large spaces — warehouses, factories, or anchor retail units — who do not expect to generate significant revenue in early trading periods. In such cases, leases commonly include a tiered breakpoint structure with a declining percentage rate as sales increase:

Sales Tier	Percentage Rate
First $1,000,000	5%
$1,000,001 – $10,000,000	4%
Over $10,000,000	3%

This structure reduces the landlord's percentage take as the tenant scales, making large-space leases more accessible to growing businesses.

== See also ==
- Additional rent
- Base rent
- Commercial lease
- Triple net lease
- Gross lease
- Shopping mall
