= Personal guarantee =

A personal guarantee is a promise made by a person or an organization (the guarantor) to accept responsibility for some other party's debt (the debtor) if the debtor fails to pay it. In the case of a personal guarantee made by an individual on behalf of another, the person who makes the personal guarantee is usually referred to as a co-signer of a note for a loan. A guarantor can be any party, including an individual or another organization, with a credit history.

A common purpose of a personal guarantee is to allow a loan to be extended to an organization or person with either no credit history or one with a credit rating that is too poor to qualify for a loan.

If a small corporation or limited liability company lacks a credit history, and it wants the entity to be able to borrow funds, the managers and/or stockholders personally guarantee to be liable for the debt in case the organization fails to pay the debt. That is common in the case of corporate credit cards issued to small organizational borrowers in which the person issued the card also accepts personal responsibility for the debt as well as the corporation, so the issuer can go after either party if the debt is not paid.

In the case of individuals parents will sometimes provide guarantees for their adult children who lack a credit history.

The issuer of the guarantee, in effect, provides joint and several responsibility for the debt so that while the organization, as the debtor, is primarily liable to pay the debt; the creditor can also go after the guarantor as a secondary responsible party if the debtor is unwilling or unable to pay the debt. A personal guarantee means that even if the debtor declares bankruptcy and is discharged from responsibility for the debt, the guarantor is still liable for it.

== See also ==
- Surety
- Co-signing
