= Common area maintenance charges =

Charges in US commercial real estate leases

Common area maintenance charges (CAM) are one of the net charges billed to tenants in a commercial triple net (NNN) lease, and are paid by tenants to the landlord of a commercial property. A CAM charge is an additional rent, charged on top of base rent, and is mainly composed of maintenance fees for work performed on the common area of a property

Each tenant pays their pro rata share of a property's total CAM charges, which prorated share is the percentage of the tenant's rented square footage of the total, rentable square footage of the property.

A common example of a CAM item is the cost of cleaning the walkways in a shopping mall. It is assumed that every tenant benefits from a clean environment, and should share in that cost. An example of a CAM that is charged to only a subset of tenants might be the charges for cleaning the food court area, where all of the vendors in the court collectively cover the higher cost of cleaning the tables on a frequent schedule.

== Breakdown of charges ==
Landlord and Tenant negotiate CAM charges before signing the lease, so the charges vary from lease to lease, and operating costs that can be billed as CAM charges by the landlord vary from tenant to tenant. Generally, landlords want CAM charges defined so broadly that they can pass through a majority of their operating expenses to tenants. The tenant generally wants CAM charges defined narrowly in hopes that the landlord pays a majority of the operating costs.

Examples of services often billed to tenants as CAM charges include portering, parking lot striping, parking lot lighting, and landscaping. CAM charges can be broken into two subcategories—controllable and uncontrollable. Uncontrollable CAM charges are taxes, security costs, utilities, and snow removal expenses. All other expenses charged as a CAM charge are considered controllable.

In certain leases, CAM charges also consists of administrative and management fees. Administrative fees are a negotiated percentage of all costs of operating and maintaining a property. Management fees are a percentage of gross rents collected, which percentage is defined in the management agreement between the management company and ownership of the property.

== Caps and floors ==
CAM charges are subject to wide variations, as tenants move in and out and various inflationary items occur. This can make it difficult for both the tenant and landlord to predict their future cash flows with any accuracy. To address this, some leases include "cap" and "floor" terms, which limit these changes to fixed values on a year-over-year basis.

A cap on CAM charges limits the amount by which CAM charges can rise each year, and are presented as a percentage. Again, as with the CAM charges themselves, caps are also negotiated between the tenant and landlord, and thus vary from lease to lease. Caps can be cumulative or compounded, and calculated year-over-base or year-over-year.

Year-over-base caps allow the cap to raise each year by a certain, predetermined percentage of a pre-determined, initial (base) CAM charge. Year-over-year caps mean the percentage increase applies not to a base amount, but to the actual CAM charge of the previous year. Cumulative caps allow the yearly percentage increase of the CAM Cap to accumulate. Thus, a yearly 5% cap would grow the cap each year by 5%, so that the first year it was a 5% cap, the 2nd year a 10% cap, the third year 15, and so on. Compounded caps allow the yearly percentage increase of the CAM Cap to grow at a compounded rate each year.

If actual CAM charges are lower than the cap, the cap does not apply. In these cases, a floor might be used instead. Floors are useful when there is some assumption that there will be inflation in CAM charges over time, even if there is no inflation in a given year. A floor will budget in a minimum increase in the charges, with the expectation that it will lessen a more major increase in the future.

== Recoveries ==
Also known as reconciliations, true-ups, pre-bills, or billbacks, CAM Recoveries are the annual reconciliation of the actual Common Area Maintenance Charges for a fiscal year versus the monthly charges billed to the tenant.

The monthly CAM charges a tenant pays as a part of the rent are actually estimates of that tenant's monthly, pro-rated CAM charge for the current fiscal year. The estimate is created from a property's budget by the property manager. After the fiscal year ends, an audit is done of the paid CAM charges versus the actual CAM charges, and the difference is either paid to the landlord, or the tenant.
