= Fee simple =

Form of freehold land ownership

In English law, a fee simple (pl. fees simple) is one of the estates in land recognised at common law. A "fee" is a vested, heritable, present possessory interest in land. A "fee simple" is land held without being subject to a term of years (i.e., indefinitely), and thus a form of freehold ownership. Though freehold, a fee simple may nonetheless be subject to limitations on how the land may be used, such as qualifiers or conditions that disallow certain uses, or subject the vested interest to termination. For example, a condition that requires the land to be used as a public park, with a reversionary interest reserved to the grantor (the person who held the land before) if the condition fails; this is a fee simple conditional.

A fee simple without such limitations is a "fee simple absolute", the amplest form of property ownership (allodial title excepted).

The rights of the owner of a fee simple may still be extrinsically limited, say by government powers of taxation, compulsory purchase, police power, and escheat.

== History ==
The word "fee" is related to (as a reduced form of) the term fief, meaning a feudal landholding. Feudal land tenures existed in several varieties, most of which involved the tenant having to supply some service to his overlord, such as knight-service (which was military service). If the tenant's overlord was the king, grand serjeanty, then this might require providing many different services, such as providing horses in time of war or acting as the king's ceremonial butler. These fiefs gave rise to a complex relationship between landlord and tenant, involving duties on both sides. For example, in return for receiving his tenant's fealty or homage, the overlord had a duty to protect his tenant. When feudal land tenure was abolished, all fiefs became "simple", without conditions attached to the tenancy.

=== Etymology ===
The origin of this term lies in Medieval French fief simple, which in Latin was feudum simplex. Under such influence, by tradition and contrary to normal English grammar, the adjective is postpositive (it follows the noun fee), just as in many other Medieval terms connected with the French-speaking invaders and their royal court (cf. Princess Royal, heir apparent/presumptive, Lords spiritual and temporal).

Simplex, the Latin source of simple, is from sem- + -plex, meaning 'onefold', from a Proto-Indo-European *sem 'one', root also of semi- ('half'). Feudum (also spelt feodum) was the Latin rendering of the Frankish word *fehu ('livestock'; the asterisk means that it is not attested), related to Modern German Vieh ('cattle, or any beast'; pronounced FEE-uh), ultimately going back to the Proto-Indo-European root *péḱu 'livestock', which referred to mobile wealth, that is, cattle. The Latin word pecunia ('money') also comes from this root, having become the English word pecuniary via its pecuniarium form.

== Common law ==
In English common law, the Crown had radical title or the allodium of all land in England, meaning that it was the ultimate "owner" of all land in the past feudal era. Allodial title is reserved to governments under a civil law structure.

However, the Crown can grant ownership in an abstract entity – called an estate in land – which is what is owned rather than the land it represents. The fee simple estate is also called "estate in fee simple" or "fee-simple title", or sometimes simply "freehold" in England and Wales. From the start of the Norman period, when feudalism was introduced to England, the tenant or "holder" of a fief could not alienate (sell) it from the possession of his overlord. However, a tenant could separate a parcel of the land and grant it as a subordinate fief to his own sub-tenant, a process known as sub-enfeoffing or "subinfeudation". The 1290 Statute of Quia Emptores abolished subinfeudation and instead allowed the sale of fee simple estates.

William Blackstone defined fee simple as the estate in land that a person has when the lands are given to him and his heirs absolutely, without any end or limit put to his estate. Land held in fee simple can be conveyed to whomsoever its owner pleases; it can also be mortgaged or put up as security. Owners of real property in fee simple have the privilege of interest in the property during their lifetime and typically have a say in determining who gets to own an interest in the property after their death.

Historically, estates could be limited in time. Common temporal limitations include life estate, a land ownership that terminates upon the grantee's (or another person's) death even if the land had been granted to a third party, or a term of years, a lease for a specified term, such as in an estate for years. A fee also could be limited through the method of its inheritance, such as by an "entailment", which created a fee tail. Traditionally, fee tail was created by words of grant such as "to N. and the male heirs of his body", which would restrict those who could inherit the property. If no heirs could be found, then the property would revert to the original grantor's heirs. Most common law countries have abolished entailment by statute.

== Duration ==
An estate in fee simple denotes the maximum ownership in land that can be legally granted; it is the greatest possible aggregate of rights, powers, privileges and immunities available in land. The three hallmarks of the fee simple estate are that it is alienable, devisable and descendible.

== Creation and characteristic of fee simple ==
Rules requiring words of general inheritance to create fee simple by conveyance have been abolished by statute in the United States. To convey an estate in fee simple at common law, the deed or will must state "to B and his heirs". Anything short of those words transferred a smaller estate.

Modern deeds usually follow a standardized form. There is a presumption that the testator intends to convey his or her property in fee simple unless the will indicates an intention to transfer a smaller estate, such as a life estate.

== Life estate ==
Many jurisdictions retain the possibility of creating a life estate, although this is uncommon. In the United States, life estates are most commonly used either to grant someone use of the property for the remainder of that person's life in a will, or by a grantor to reserve the right to continue using the property for the remainder of the grantor's life after it is sold. The right to ownership of the property after the death of the life estate owner is called the remainder estate. In England and Wales fee simple is the only freehold estate that remains; a life estate can only be created in equity and is not a right in property.

=== Retained life estate gift ===
In the United States, retained life estates are often used by donors who intend to leave property as bequests to charitable organizations while retaining the use of the property during their lifetimes. The donor receives a tax deduction for the gift of their remainder interest in the property, and at the donor's death, the property passes to the organization without being subject to probate. Retained life estate gifts often involve agreements about acceptable uses of the property, payment of real estate taxes, property maintenance, etc. during the donor's lifetime.

== Types of fee simple ==
If previous grantors of a fee simple estate do not create any conditions for subsequent grantees, then the title is called fee simple absolute. A fee simple absolute is the highest estate permitted by law, and it gives the holder full possessory rights and obligations now and in the future. Other fee simple estates in real property include fee simple defeasible (or fee simple determinable) estates. A defeasible estate is created when a grantor places a condition on a fee simple estate (in the deed). When a specified event happens, the estate may become void or subject to annulment. There are two types of defeasible estates: fee simple determinable and the fee simple subject to a condition subsequent. If the grantor uses durational language in the condition such as "to A. as long as the land is used for a park", then upon the happening of the specified event (in this case if the land is used for anything other than a park), the estate will automatically terminate and revert to the grantor or the grantor's estate; this is called a fee simple determinable. If the grantor uses language such as "but if alcohol is served", then the grantor or the heirs have a right of entry if the condition occurs, but the estate does not automatically revert to the grantor; this is a fee simple subject to a condition subsequent. In most jurisdictions in the United States these concepts have been modified by statute. Fee simple determinable was generally preferred by courts in the common law of the early United States. Recently, that trend has reversed, and most courts in the United States will find a fee simple subject to condition subsequent in situations where the conveying document's language is unclear.

== Rent ==
The claim that no rent or similar obligations are due from the owner of property in fee simple is only partially true. For example, a rentcharge may exist requiring a freeholder to pay a fixed sum of money closely resembling rent, and many jurisdictions have created financial obligations that may be imposed on a freehold estate. England and Wales impose an estate charge. In the United States, fee simple owners are usually subject to property tax and the revenue generated is directed to the municipality's general fund. Other local tax assessments called "special purpose taxes" may be assessed in addition to the property taxes for specific purposes such as infrastructure improvements. Real estate owned as a condominium is usually similarly owned in fee simple, but typically subject to rules in the declaration of condominium or created by the condominium association, such as paying required monthly fees for maintaining the property's common areas; however, these are generally treated legally as covenants running with the land (contracts binding on the possessors of real property) imposing an affirmative duty to pay money rather than as rent for property held in fee simple.

== See also ==
- Freehold (law), covering all types and mentioning trusts and most common, major, adverse interests.
  - Freehold (Scots law)
- Allodial title
- Fee tail
- Leasehold
- Life estate
- Quia Emptores
