= Net lease =

Commercial real estate lease agreement

In the field of commercial real estate, especially in the United States, a net lease requires the tenant to pay, in addition to rent, some or all of the property expenses that normally would be paid by the property owner (known as the "landlord" or "lessor"). These include expenses such as property taxes, insurance, maintenance, repair, and operations, utilities, and other items. These expenses are often categorized into the "three nets": property taxes, insurance, and maintenance. In US parlance, a lease where all three of these expenses are paid by the tenant is known as a triple net lease, NNN Lease, or triple-N for short and sometimes written NNN.

The term "net lease" is distinguished from the term "gross lease". In a net lease, the property owner receives the rent "net" after the expenses that are to be passed through to tenants are paid. In a gross lease, the tenant pays a gross amount of rent, which the landlord can use to pay expenses or in any other way as the landlord sees fit. Gross leases typically have higher rent charges to recuperate some of these expenses in the rent line, as opposed to doing so through a net arrangement.

The precise items that are to be paid by the tenant are usually specified in a written lease. For properties that are leased by more than one tenant, such as a shopping center, the expenses that are passed on to the tenants are usually pro-rated among the tenants based on the size (square footage) of the area occupied by each tenant. Many variations exist, with options to control any year-to-year variations in fees and such.

== Types of net leases ==
There are standard names in the commercial real estate industry for different sets of costs passed on to the tenant in a net lease.

=== Single net lease ===
In a single net lease (sometimes shortened to Net or N), the lessee or tenant is responsible for paying property taxes. These are generally not common.

=== Double net lease ===
In a double net lease (Net-Net or NN), the lessee or tenant is responsible for property tax and building insurance. The lessor or landlord is responsible for any expenses incurred for structural repairs and common area maintenance.

=== Triple net lease ===
A triple net lease (triple-Net or NNN) is a lease agreement on a property where the tenant or lessee agrees to pay all real estate taxes, building insurance, and maintenance (the three "nets") on the property in addition to any normal fees that are expected under the agreement (rent, utilities, etc.). In such a lease, the tenant or lessee is responsible for all costs associated with the repair and maintenance of any common area (also known as CAM - Common Area Maintenance). CAM fees typically are negotiated up front as a set dollar figure per square foot.

This form of lease is most frequently used for commercial freestanding buildings. However, it has also been used in single-family residential rental real estate properties.

=== Bondable lease ===
A bondable lease (also called an "absolute triple net lease", "true triple net lease", "hell-or-high-water lease", or "absolute net lease") is the most extreme variation of a triple net lease, where the tenant carries every imaginable real estate risk related to the property. Notably, these additional risks include the obligations to rebuild after a casualty, regardless of the adequacy of insurance proceeds, and to pay rent after partial or full condemnation. These leases are not terminable by the tenant, nor are rent abatements permissible. The concept is to make the rent absolutely net under all circumstances, equivalent to the obligations of a bond: hence the "hell-or-high water" moniker. An example of this type of lease would be a leaseback arrangement in which a retailer leases back the building it formerly owned and continues to run the store.

Bondable leases are typically used in so-called credit tenant lease deals, where the main driver of value is not so much the real estate, but the uninterrupted cash flow from the usually investment-grade rated "credit" tenant. Because bondable lease investments offer such low risk, higher investment rates can indicate a recovery in not only the bond market, but also in the overall real estate market.

=== Ground lease ===
A "ground lease" is another variation of a net lease. Under a ground lease, the landowner leases the land to the lessee which gives the lessee the opportunity to construct a building. The lessee will then have a leasehold interest in the property. Under a ground lease the tenant will typically pay for the same items they pay for under a Triple Net Lease or Bondable Lease. Generally, ownership of the building will revert to the landowner at conclusion of the lease.

== Economics ==
Typically, the buildings in which landlords use triple net leases (NNN) are "equity investments", rather than "cash flow investments". For example, the owner will finance a significant portion of the purchase price on a property and pay the resulting mortgage with the lessee's monthly owed rent. There is usually a small amount left over as monthly profit for the owner (positive cash flow), but the greater investment payoff comes from the tax shields afforded to the owner through the use of leverage or gearing. The resulting property is then sold after a period of equity-building, usually five years – the typical commercial mortgage term.
