= Tenant inducement =

Consideration given by landlord to attract or keep a tenant

In commercial real estate, a tenant inducement (TI) is some sort of consideration given by a landlord in order to attract a new tenant or have an existing one renew their lease. Depending on the contents, the concept may be known as a concession or rent abatement, instead of inducement.

There are several different forms of inducements. One common one is a signing bonus, a direct payment of some sort but generally not related to the rent. One particular form of bonus is the lease pickup, where the landlord will pay penalties for breaking an existing lease. Another common type of inducement is some period of free rent, typically one or two months, as a reward for signing for a particular period of time. Free rent may also be known as rent abatement, a specific use of a term that may also be used more generically. Inducements can also be provided in the form of compensation for tenant improvements, which takes the form of either direct payments that the tenant can use to improve the rental unit, or similar renovations carried out by the landlord.

The roll of real estate agents and real estate brokers is sometimes conflated. The United States Department of Labor explains that, "Brokers and agents can represent either the buyer or the seller in a transaction. Buyers' brokers and agents meet with clients to understand what they are looking for in a property and how much they can afford."

== See also ==
- Leasing commission
