= Gross lease =

A gross lease is a type of commercial lease where the tenant pays a flat rental amount, and the landlord pays for all operating expenses regularly incurred by the ownership, including taxes, electricity and water. The term "gross lease" is distinguished from the term "net lease."

== Types of gross leases ==
Modified Gross (MG)

In a modified gross lease, tenants typically pay a proportional share of operating expenses.

Full-Service Gross (FSG)

In a full service gross lease, outgoings (operating expenses) are paid by the landlord, but are imputed into the price of the lease.
