= H. Allen Smith (politician) =

American politician

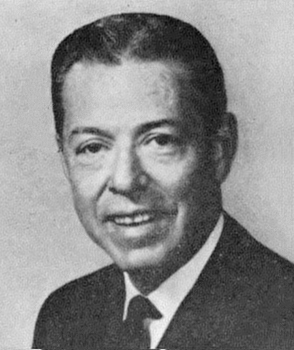

Member of the U.S. House of Representatives from California's 20th district
- In office January 3, 1957 – January 3, 1973
- Preceded by: Carl Hinshaw
- Succeeded by: Carlos Moorhead

Member of the California State Assembly from the 43rd district
- In office January 3, 1949 – January 3, 1957
- Preceded by: C. Don Field
- Succeeded by: Howard J. Thelin

Personal details
- Born: Harold Allen Smith; October 8, 1909 Dixon, Illinois, U.S.
- Died: June 4, 1998 (aged 88) Glendale, California, U.S.
- Resting place: Forest Lawn Memorial Park in Glendale
- Party: Republican
- Education: University of California, Los Angeles; University of Southern California (BA, LLB)

Harold Allen Smith (October 8, 1909 – June 4, 1998) was an American politician who served eight terms as a Republican representative from California from 1957 to 1973.

== Biography ==
Born in Dixon, Lee County, Illinois, October 8, 1909, Smith was an F.B.I. agent and later a member of the California State Assembly from the 43rd district from 1949 to 1957, a presidential elector for California in 1956, and a representative from California's 20th congressional district from 1957 to 1973.

=== Tenure ===
In Congress, Smith voted in favor of the Civil Rights Acts of 1957 and 1960, as well as the 24th Amendment to the U.S. Constitution, but voted against the Civil Rights Acts of 1964 and 1968 and the Voting Rights Act of 1965. He was also a delegate from California to the Republican National Convention in 1960.

=== Death ===
Smith died in Glendale, California on June 4, 1998, and was interred at Forest Lawn Memorial Park in Glendale.

== Family ==
He was married to the former Elizabeth McKay. They had two sons, Lauren and Stephen Smith.

== Electoral history ==
Allen Smith electoral history

1956 United States House of Representatives elections in California, 20th district
Party	Candidate	Votes	%
Republican	H. Allen Smith	85,459	70.8
Democratic	Eugene Radding	35,249	29.2
Total votes		120,708	100.0
Republican hold			

1958 United States House of Representatives elections in California, 20th district
Party	Candidate	Votes	%
Republican	H. Allen Smith (Incumbent)	72,311	66
Democratic	Eugene Radding	37,331	34
Total votes		109,642	100.0
Republican hold			

1960 United States House of Representatives elections in California, 20th district
Party	Candidate	Votes	%
Republican	H. Allen Smith (Incumbent)	90,214	70.1
Democratic	Eugene Radding	38,497	29.9
Total votes		128,711	100.0
Republican hold			

1962 United States House of Representatives elections in California, 20th district
Party	Candidate	Votes	%
Republican	H. Allen Smith (Incumbent)	119,938	70.6
Democratic	Leon Mayer	49,850	29.4
Total votes		169,788	100.0
Republican hold			

1964 United States House of Representatives elections in California, 20th district
Party	Candidate	Votes	%
Republican	H. Allen Smith (Incumbent)	132,402	67.9
Democratic	C. Bernard Kaufman	62,645	32.1
Total votes		195,047	100.0
Republican hold			

1966 United States House of Representatives elections in California, 20th district
Party	Candidate	Votes	%
Republican	H. Allen Smith (Incumbent)	128,896	73.4
Democratic	Raymond Freschi	46,730	26.6
Total votes		175,626	100.0
Republican hold			

1968 United States House of Representatives elections in California, 20th district
Party	Candidate	Votes	%
Republican	H. Allen Smith (Incumbent)	133,148	69.3
Democratic	Don White	56,008	29.2
Peace and Freedom	Robert J. Clarke	2,965	1.5
Total votes		192,121	100.0
Republican hold			

1970 United States House of Representatives elections in California, 20th district
Party	Candidate	Votes	%
Republican	H. Allen Smith (Incumbent)	116,437	69.1
Democratic	Michael M. Stolzberg	50,033	29.7
American Independent	Earl C. Harper	2,100	1.2
Total votes		168,570	100.0
Republican hold			

U.S. House of Representatives
Preceded by Carl Hinshaw	Member of the U.S. House of Representatives from California's 20th congressional district 1957–1973	Succeeded by Carlos Moorhead
