= California's 43rd district =

California's 43rd district may refer to:

- California's 43rd congressional district
- California's 43rd State Assembly district
