= Dario Frommer =

American politician (born 1963)

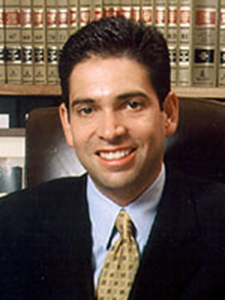
- Official portrait, 2005

Majority Leader of the California Assembly
- In office December 6, 2004 – November 30, 2006
- Preceded by: Wilma Chan
- Succeeded by: Karen Bass

Member of the California State Assembly from the 43rd district
- In office December 4, 2000 – November 30, 2006
- Preceded by: Scott Wildman
- Succeeded by: Paul Krekorian

Personal details
- Born: October 22, 1963 (age 63) Long Beach, California, U.S.
- Party: Democratic
- Spouse: Lorraine Paskett
- Children: 1
- Education: Colgate University (BA); University of California Davis (JD)

Dario J. Frommer (born October 22, 1963) is an American lawyer and politician. He is a former member of the California State Assembly for the 43rd district who served from 2000 until 2006. He served as Majority Leader from 2004 until 2006. Frommer also served as Chair of the Health Committee.

== Early life, education, and early career ==
Born on October 22, 1963 in Long Beach, California, Frommer grew up in Glendale and is Mexican Hungarian-Jewish. His Hungarian-American father Roger Frommer and his Mexican-American mother Rosa were members of the Democratic Party and active campaign volunteers. His grandparents were lower-income immigrants from Mexico.

Frommer graduated from Hoover High School in 1981. He was a member of the student government and Latin Club, and wrote for the school newspaper, The Purple Press, which sparked his interest in journalism. At the age of 17, he was elected youth governor of his school's YMCA program. Later on, in 2001, he was invited to his alma mater to speak on and celebrate the state of California's first observance of Cesar Chavez Day.

During the 1980 United States presidential election, while still in high school, Frommer and his friend attempted to draft their English teacher Leon Wiskup for president, but were dissuaded by the $500 filing fee; instead, he volunteered for John Anderson's Independent presidential bid and represented Anderson in a debate against then-Assemblyman Pat Nolan.

Frommer was a political science and international relations student, and graduated from Colgate University with a Bachelor of Arts in International Relations in 1985. In the summer of 1982, he interned for Art Torres's state assembly campaign; after graduation, he returned to Glendale and worked as a chief of staff and press secretary for Torres until 1988. In 1989, he was acquainted with State Controller Gray Davis, serving as his deputy controller and press secretary, but left Sacramento later that year to attend law school.

In 1992, Frommer graduated from UC Davis School of Law with a Juris Doctor. He worked as an environmental litigator after graduating, but remarked that the work was "horrible" and said he "[would]n't want to come back to that". As a result, in 1994, he helped with Art Torres's 1994 State Insurance Commissioner campaign, in which Torres lost. He also served as an advisor and spokesperson for the California Democratic Party. Additionally, he taught political science classes at two community colleges.

== Gubernatorial aide and 2000 State Assembly campaign ==
In 1998, Frommer served as the political director of Gray Davis's 1998 gubernatorial bid, Davis won, becoming California's first Democratic governor in 16 years. In December 1998, Davis appointed Frommer as his Appointments Secretary, whose responsibilities included advising the governor on possible appointees for various state level positions. Frommer became the first Latino to hold this position.

In October 1999, while living in Los Feliz, Frommer announced his bid for the State Assembly's 43rd district to succeed Scott Wildman, a Democrat who had represented the seat since 1996. He resigned from his secretary position in order to run.

Frommer faced Paul Krekorian and John Hisserich in the primary. Frommer was backed by the California Democratic Party, city councilor Alex Padilla, and United Teachers Los Angeles; meanwhile, Paul Krekorian was endorsed by the Democratic Party of San Fernando Valley and state senator Adam Schiff. Prior to the primary election, Frommer pulled an upset when he won the endorsement of the Verdugo Hills Democratic Club, which Krekorian was favored to receive, by one vote. In March 2000, Frommer defeated Krekorian by a narrow margin.

After defeating Republican former county prosecutor Craig Missakian in the general election by 51% to 48%, Frommer became the first Latino to represent the district.

== Political career ==
=== State Assembly ===
==== 2001–2002 legislative session ====
In January 2001, State Assembly Speaker Robert Hertzberg appointed Frommer to the California Film Commission, replacing Sheila Kuehl, and he held this position until 2005.

In April 2002, the California Fair Political Practices Commission required Frommer to pay a $6,000 fine after his then-attorney Steve Kaufman failed to report $40,000 in campaign contributions in 2000 in a timely manner; afterward, he no longer retained Kaufman.

In August 2002, Frommer's bill to prohibit online sales of cigarettes and other tobacco products to Californian residents under the age of 18 and require age verification for such purchases, AB 1830, passed both chambers of the California State Legislature.

In September 2002, California Governor Gray Davis signed two of Frommer's bills into law. On September 20, he signed Frommer's AB 2326, which would establish Braille literacy standards for visually-impaired students. On September 25, he signed Frommer's AB 915, which would require the California Department of Health Care Services to apply for a request of intergovernmental fund transfer to the federal government in order to provide a supplemental Medi-Cal reimbursement for adult day health centers and acute care hospitals.

==== 2003–2004 legislative session ====
In January 2003, State Assembly Speaker Herb Wesson appointed Frommer as chair of the Select Committee on Small Business. Wesson also appointed Frommer as chair of the Health Committee. As Health Committee chair, when a soda ban bill prohibiting sales of soft drinks in schools reached the committee in August 2003, he insisted on an exemption for high schools. As a result, the high school provision was put to a separate vote, which failed to get the votes needed, in exchange for the elementary and middle school soda ban passing with an earlier implementation.

Moreover, Frommer also appointed as chair of the Select Committee on Runway Film Production for the legislative session. In August 2003, Governor Gray Davis signed AB 1478 into law, a bill introduced by Frommer to prohibit and fine elected officials (Note: Up to $5,000 according to Variety Magazine and up to $10,000 according to Deadline Hollywood.) for soliciting campaign donations for support in obtaining a film permit. Frommer argued that the increased filming costs would encourage the movement of film production to Canada and Mexico instead, following reports involving Los Angeles City Councilors, and cited a drop of 7,400 jobs pertaining to film production.

==== 2004 Speakership bid ====
Since Speaker Herb Wesson was term-limited, Wesson said he would resign from the speakership in March instead of December 2004, with Frommer, Jenny Oropeza, and Fabian Nunez in a three-way race but unable to win the majority of the 48 State Assembly Democrats. After 10 moderate Frommer supporters met with him to urge him to withdraw his name from consideration and instead endorse Nunez, Frommer followed suit, citing the need for party unity, and Oropeza also conceded, resulting in Nunez's election as Speaker.

In 2004, he was instead elected as Majority Leader of the State Assembly.

==== 2005–2006 legislative session ====
In October 2005, Republican Governor Arnold Schwarzenegger signed Frommer's AB 1666 into law, which would allow active duty California National Guard members to cancel cellphone contracts without any penalty, get credits on their college tuition, waive state bar fees, and get an extension on utility bills; meanwhile, he vetoed Frommer's AB 73, which would have required the state to establish a website that displays the cheaper prescription prices from pharmacies in the United Kingdom, Canada, and Ireland.

==== 2006 California State Controller bid ====
In 2005, Frommer announced a bid for State Controller in 2006. Frommer was considered a frontrunner for the Democratic nomination; however, in March 2006, Frommer withdrew from the race, citing the need for a balance between family and workload.

In December 2022, CalMatters reported that Frommer had $593,000 sitting in a committee for a 2026 California State Controller election bid, with all the funds having been carried over from his 2006 bid.

=== Political career after the State Assembly ===
In January 2008, State Assembly Speaker Fabian Nunez appointed Frommer to the California Transportation Commission. Frommer served as Chair of the Commission and pushed for the expansion of high-speed rail. His term ended in January 2016.

In February 2008, Frommer declared his bid for the 21st State Senate district. In March 2008, he withdrew his bid, stating that he intended on running for the 2010 California Insurance Commissioner election, thereby leaving Carol Liu to run in the primary unopposed. He established a committee, but ultimately did not run.

In 2012, Frommer spoke in opposition to 2012 California Proposition 28, arguing it would not take into account legislative productivity and success.

In June 2013, Robert Hertzberg announced that Frommer and David Fleming would serve as campaign co-chairs for his 18th State Senate district bid in 2014. Hertzberg's bid was successful, and he was elected to the California Senate.

Frommer was appointed by Los Angeles Mayor Eric Garcetti to the oversight board for the dissolution of the Los Angeles Redevelopment Agency; he also served on the national advisory board of UC Davis Betty Irene Moore School of Nursing from 2015 to 2021.

In addition, Frommer served on the boards of YMCA of the Foothills, Children's Law Center of California, One Arroyo, Los Angeles Economic Development Corporation, and the Coalition for Clean Air.

== Legal career ==
In December 2006, Frommer joined as a partner of Mayer Brown for its government practice group, specializing on issues such as health care, tax reform and the environment

In November 2013, Frommer joined as a partner of Akin Gump Strauss Hauer & Feld LLP for public law and policy practice. In May 2024, Frommer rejoined Mayer Brown as a partner for public policy, regulatory, and government affairs practice.

== Personal life ==
In September 2004, Frommer married Lorraine Paskett, a fellow attorney, in Goleta. At the time of their marriage, Paskett had graduated from University of the Pacific St. George School of Law and was serving as the director of Pacific Gas and Electric Company. They have a son, also named Dario, born in 2005. The family resides in La Cañada Flintridge, California.

In 2015, Frommer's wife Paskett purchased a historical estate in Lodi, California developed by Benjamin F. Langford, who served in the California Senate for the 23rd and 33rd districts from 1880 to 1899. After renovating the estate, Paskett and her father Herb (Frommer's father-in-law) founded Paskett Vineyards & Winery in 2017.

== Notes ==
Political offices
Preceded by Scott Wildman	California State Assemblyman, 43rd District; 2000–2006	Succeeded by Paul Krekorian
Preceded by Marco Firebaugh or Wilma Chan	Majority Leader of the California State Assembly; 2004–2006	Succeeded by Karen Bass
