= Thelin =

Thelin may refer to:

- Sitaxentan, a medication

== People with the surname ==
- Björn Thelin (1942–2017), a member of The Spotnicks
- Eje Thelin (1938–1990), a Swedish trombonist
- Howard J. Thelin (1921–2011)
- Håkon Thelin (born 1976), a Norwegian musician
- Isaac Kiese Thelin (born 1992), a Swedish footballer
- Jimmy Thelin (born 1978), a Swedish footballer
- Mats Thelin (born 1961), a Swedish retired ice hockey player
- Tommy Thelin (born 1983), a Swedish footballer
- Adrien Thélin (1842–1922), a Swiss politician
