= Paul Krekorian =

American politician

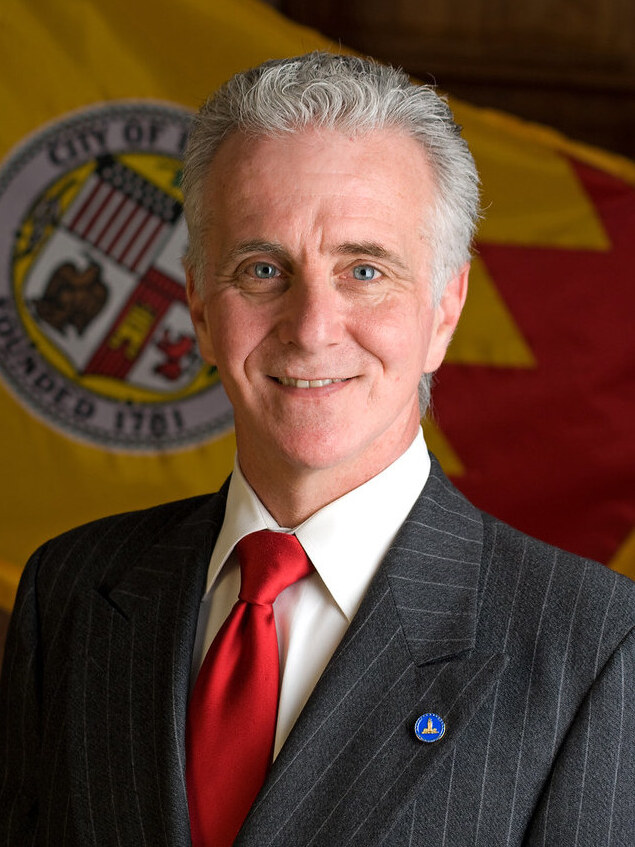
- Official portrait, 2010

President of the Los Angeles City Council
- In office October 18, 2022 – September 20, 2024
- Preceded by: Nury Martinez; Mitch O'Farrell (acting)
- Succeeded by: Marqueece Harris-Dawson

Member of the Los Angeles City Council from the 2nd district
- In office January 5, 2010 – December 9, 2024
- Preceded by: Wendy Greuel
- Succeeded by: Adrin Nazarian

Member of the California State Assembly from the 43rd district
- In office December 4, 2006 – January 5, 2010
- Preceded by: Dario Frommer
- Succeeded by: Mike Gatto

Personal details
- Born: March 24, 1960 (age 66) San Fernando Valley, California, U.S.
- Party: Democratic
- Education: University of Southern California (BA); University of California, Berkeley (JD)
- Website: Official website
- Paul Krekorian's voice Paul Krekorian on independent redistricting for the Los Angeles City Council; Recorded October 26, 2023

Paul Krekorian (born March 24, 1960) is an American politician who served as the Los Angeles city councilmember for the second district from 2010 until 2024. A member of the Democratic Party, he served as the president of the Los Angeles City Council from October 18, 2022 to September 20, 2024. He was previously a member of the California State Assembly, representing the 43rd Assembly district. Krekorian is the first Armenian American to be elected to office in the city of Los Angeles.

== Early life ==
Krekorian was born in California's San Fernando Valley, as a third-generation San Fernando Valley resident. He is the son of JoAnn, a North Hollywood native, and Erwin Krekorian, a Marine Corps WWII veteran. His father was of Armenian descent and ran a small business on Saticoy Street in Van Nuys. Krekorian completed his primary education entirely within the Los Angeles Unified School District, graduating from Cleveland High School in Reseda. As the first member of his family to attend college, Krekorian enrolled in the University of Southern California, where he first became active in political causes. He worked with then-Assemblyman Tom Bane, became the campus organizer for Jerry Brown's 1978 gubernatorial campaign and helped lead USC's Democratic student group. After graduating with a B.A. degree in political science from USC, Krekorian went on to earn a J.D. degree from the University of California, Berkeley School of Law. Krekorian became an organizer for Bill Clinton's 1992 presidential campaign and co-chaired the Saxophone Club, the Democratic National Committee's nationwide young professionals group.

Krekorian practiced law, with a focus on business, entertainment, and intellectual-property litigation, at the firms Skadden Arps, Dewey Ballantine and Leopold, Petrich & Smith, and Fisher & Krekorian, where he was a name partner. He served on the board of trustees of the LA County Bar Association, the Board of Trustees of the LA County Law Library and the California State Legislature's Task Force on Court Facilities. In the aftermath of the 1992 Los Angeles riots, Krekorian was counsel to the Webster Commission and was appointed to the Los Angeles City Ethics Commission. Krekorian has been praised for his efforts in preserving women's rights for his pro-bono work in the fight against domestic violence, and a program he developed for at-risk youth, called GenerationNext.

== Personal life ==
Krekorian lives in the San Fernando Valley with his wife Tamar and children Hrag, Andrew, and Lori.

== Political career ==
Krekorian has served the San Fernando Valley for more than two decades, first as a member of the Burbank School Board and then as a California State Assemblymember. He served as a member of the Los Angeles City Council until he termed out in December 2024, representing District 2 in the southeast San Fernando Valley. Council District 2 includes the communities of North Hollywood, Studio City, Valley Glen, Valley Village, Toluca Lake, and parts of Sun Valley and Van Nuys.

Krekorian was also the founding president of the Democrats for Neighborhood Action.

=== California State Assembly ===
==== 2000 State Assembly bid ====
In a bid to succeed Democrat Scott Wildman for the 43rd State Assembly district, Krekorian, who resided in Toluca Lake, faced two opponents in the race: Dario Frommer, Governor Gray Davis's former Appointment Secretary (who resigned in order to run), and USC healthcare administrator John Hisserich.

Krekorian was endorsed by the Democratic Party of San Fernando Valley and state senator Adam Schiff; meanwhile, Frommer was endorsed by the California Democratic Party, city councilor Alex Padilla, and United Teachers Los Angeles. Prior to the primary election, Frommer pulled an upset when he won the endorsement of the Verdugo Hills Democratic Club, which Krekorian was favored to receive due to his more senior membership in the club, by a margin of one vote. In March 2000, Frommer defeated Krekorian by a narrow margin.

==== Tenure in the State Assembly (2006–2010) ====
In 2006, Krekorian was elected to the 43rd district of the California State Assembly, succeeding term-limited Assembly Majority Leader Dario Frommer. During his first term in office, Krekorian held one of the best records in the Assembly with the highest number of bills signed into law by any freshman legislator. He was named Assistant Majority Floor Leader of the State Assembly, the third ranking leadership position in the Assembly, by then-Speaker Karen Bass. Krekorian's legislative priorities included making government more accessible and responsive, saving and creating jobs, protecting the environment and increasing public safety. He created the "Government at Your Doorstep" program in response to complaints about speeding, graffiti, and noise pollution in his district. As the state battled to pass a balanced budget in early 2009, Krekorian authored a historic bill to ensure film and TV production in California stays local. His bill was the first successful tax incentive aimed at saving California jobs by addressing runaway production. On-location feature production increased 9.1 percent in the second quarter of 2012, generating 160 production days in Southern California. Krekorian also introduced legislation that restricted plastic pollution in ocean run-off, expanded renewable energy generation for California public utilities and reduced carbon emissions. He worked closely with local police departments to reduce gang violence, along with crime in his district and throughout the state. In his first Assembly term, Krekorian's Weapons and Ammunition Nuisance Abatement Act of 2007 gave apartment owners greater latitude to evict tenants who harbor guns and ammo. That year, Krekorian also introduced and passed a bill to encourage participation with federal authorities to siphon off the state's stock of weapons.

=== Los Angeles City Council ===
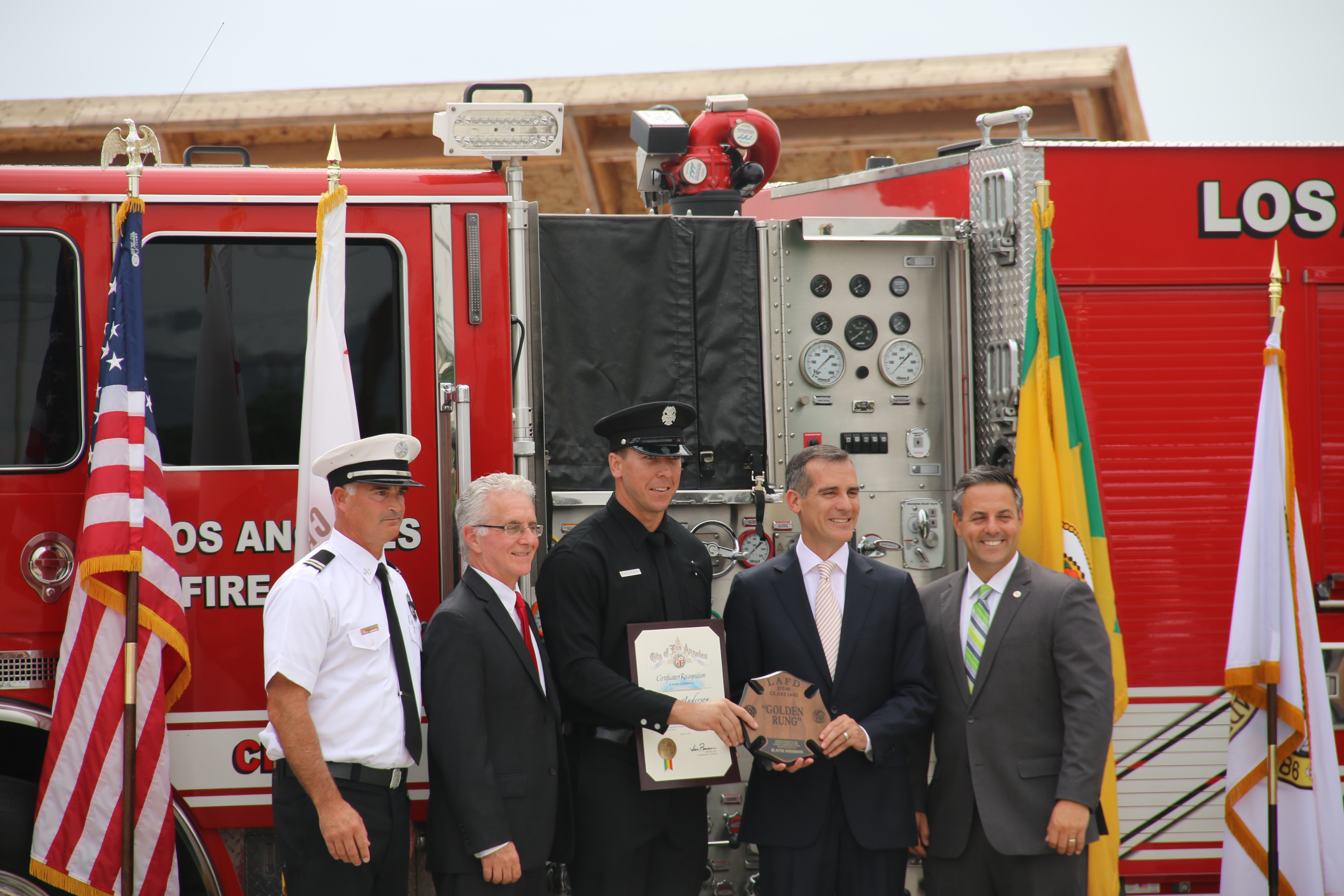
Krekorian with Joe Buscaino and Eric Garcetti, and members of the Fire Commission in 2015.

On December 8, 2009, Krekorian won a seat on the Los Angeles City Council, representing Los Angeles City Council District 2. He is the Chair of the city's powerful Budget and Finance Committee, the Vice Chair of the Housing Committee, and sits on the Energy, Climate Change and Environmental Justice Committee; Trade, Travel and Tourism Committee; Executive Employee Relations Committee; and the Board of Referred Powers. He also serves on the board of the Los Angeles County Metropolitan Transportation Authority (Metro) and Metrolink, and sits on the San Fernando Valley Council of Governments, a coalition of leaders advocating for the Valley's two million residents.

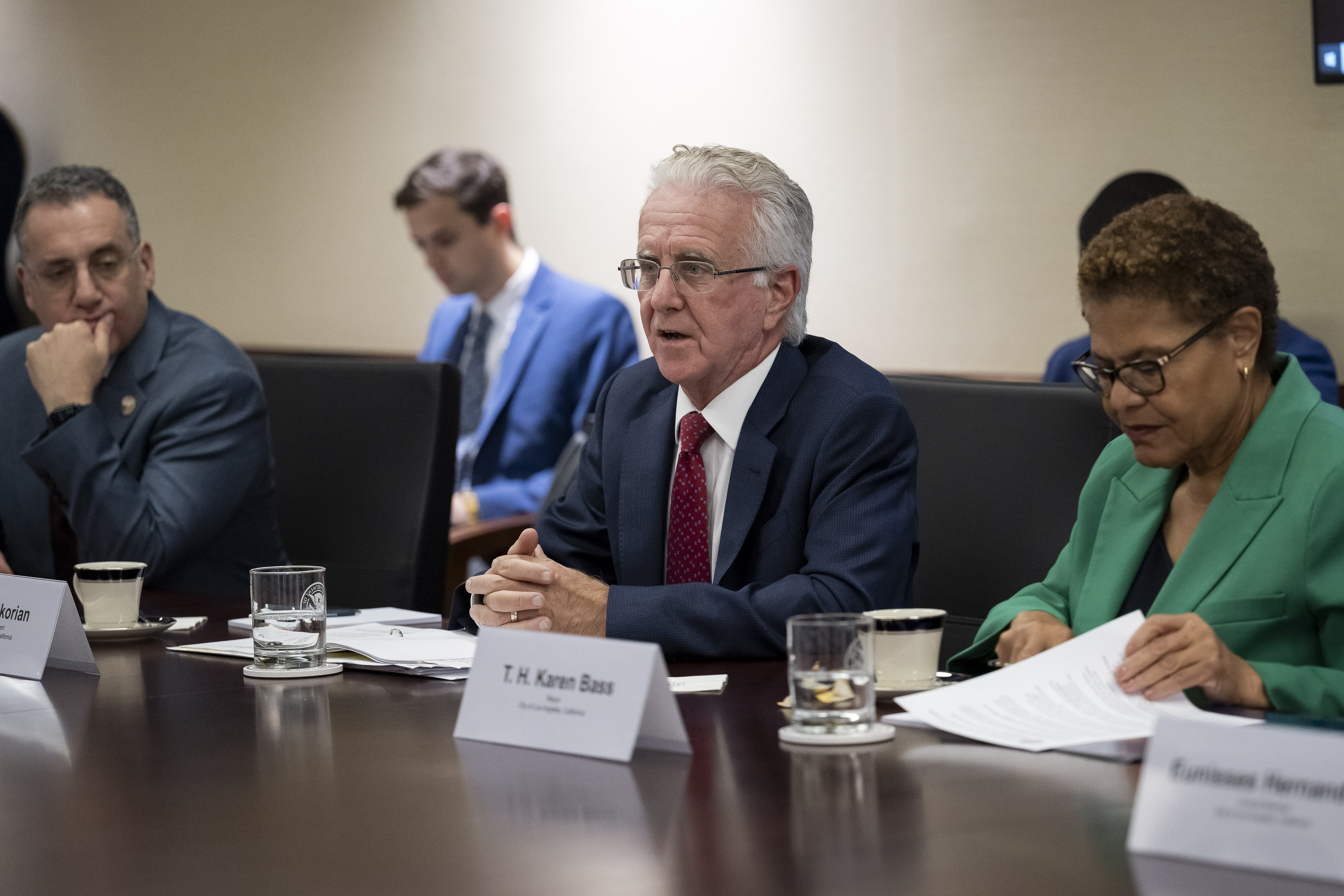
Krekorian with Mayor Karen Bass and other city councilmembers during a meeting with Alejandro Mayorkas, 2023.

In 2012, Krekorian was tapped to lead the Budget and Finance Committee, inheriting the responsibility of overseeing a multi-billion dollar General Fund budget. Since taking the helm, he has taken a "difficult but responsible approach to solving a $220 million deficit and enhancing the city’s solvency."

Krekorian has advocated for expanding rail and bus transit in the Valley, including electrifying and eventually converting the G Line (Los Angeles Metro) to light rail, completing the East Valley North-South Transit Corridor and Sepulveda Pass projects, linking the Red Line to the Hollywood Burbank Airport and connecting the San Fernando and San Gabriel Valleys by rail. He has also led the efforts to connect North Hollywood to Pasadena with a Bus Rapid Transit (BRT) line.

On October 18, 2022, Krekorian was elected the president of the Los Angeles City Council following the resignation of former council president Nury Martinez.

== Electoral history ==
His campaign officially began on July 10, 2009, when Krekorian officially announced his candidacy to fill the vacant District 2 seat in a special election. The primary was held on September 22, in which Krekorian placed first with 34% of the vote. A runoff was scheduled for December 8 and, aided by support from a number of public safety, environmental, and Democratic groups, including Los Angeles Daily News, the United Firefighters of Los Angeles City, the Los Angeles Chapter of the Sierra Club, and the Democratic Party of the San Fernando Valley, Krekorian soundly defeated Christine Essel with more than 56% of the vote, despite being outspent 2–1 in overall campaign dollars and 13–1 in third-party political committee donations.

He was overwhelmingly elected to his first full term in 2011 and again in March 2015 and June 2020. In their editorial endorsing his March 2015 campaign, the Los Angeles Times called Krekorian "smart, knowledgeable" and a "voice for fiscal responsibility and responsive government."

== Political positions ==
=== Armenia and Artsakh ===
In response to the 2020 Second Nagorno-Karabakh War, Krekorian introduced a resolution in the Los Angeles City Council, stating that "The savage invasion of Artsakh is a blow against freedom, democracy and self-determination everywhere."

In a joint letter regarding the 2022 blockade of the Republic of Artsakh, addressed to President Joe Biden, Krekorian and Mayor of Los Angeles Karen Bass demanded the following:

1. Providing direct U.S. humanitarian assistance to Artsakh, including food and medical supplies
2. Making clear to Putin and Aliyev that the United States demands and will act to ensure the safe passage of flights into Artsakh to provide aid
3. Assertive U.S. diplomatic engagement to facilitate negotiations between Baku and Stepanakert to guarantee the rights and security of the Armenian population of Artsakh
4. Insisting that Russian troops in Artsakh be replaced by international peacekeepers
5. Taking tangible action against the regime in Azerbaijan to hold it accountable for its crimes pursuant to Section 907 of the FREEDOM Support Act and the Magnitsky Act.

=== LGBTQ+ Rights ===
At an October 2022 fundraiser brunch for GALAS LGBTQ+ Armenian Society hosted by California State Assemblymember Adrin Nazarian, Krekorian honored the organization with a proclamation.

California Assembly
Preceded by Dario Frommer	Member of the California Assembly from the 43rd district 2006–2010	Succeeded by Mike Gatto
Political offices
Preceded by Wendy Greuel	Member of the Los Angeles City Council from the 2nd district 2010–2024	Succeeded by Adrin Nazarian
Preceded by Mitch O'Farrell; Acting	President of the Los Angeles City Council; 2022–2024	Succeeded by Marqueece Harris-Dawson
