= California's 20th congressional district =

U.S. House district for California

Coordinates: 36°N 120°W

- Interactive map of district boundaries
- Representative: Vince Fong; R–Bakersfield
- Population (2025): 788,905
- Median household income: $91,738
- Ethnicity: 49.4% White; 33.8% Hispanic; 7.3% Asian; 4.6% Two or more races; 3.3% Black; 0.9% Native American; 0.8% other
- Cook PVI: R+15

California's 20th congressional district is a congressional district in California including much of the southern and southeastern part of the state's Central Valley. The district is currently represented by Republican Vince Fong. Fong was elected in a special election on May 21, 2024, after Kevin McCarthy resigned from Congress following the motion to vacate that ousted him from the office of House Speaker.

Redistricting in 2022 returned the district to the San Joaquin Valley. The new 20th district includes parts of Kern, Tulare, Kings, and Fresno counties. It includes the southern Sierra Nevada and western Mojave Desert, with three "fingers" extending west into the valley. Cities in the district include Clovis, Tehachapi, Ridgecrest, Taft, Lemoore, the west and northeast sides of Bakersfield, the south side of Visalia, the northeast side of Tulare, the north side of Hanford, and a sliver of northeastern Fresno including California State University, Fresno. The new 20th district is the most Republican district in California, with a Cook Partisan Voting Index rating of R+15.

Before 2022, it encompassed much of the Central Coast region. The district included Monterey and San Benito counties, most of Santa Cruz County, and portions of Santa Clara County.

Before redistricting in 2011, the 20th district was located in the San Joaquin Valley. It covered Kings County and portions of Fresno and Kern counties, including most of the city of Fresno. That area is now largely divided between the 21st and 16th districts, while most of the current 20th was within the former 17th.

== Recent election results from statewide races ==
=== 2023–2027 boundaries ===
Year	Office	Results
2008	President	McCain 65% - 35%
2010	Governor	Whitman 64% - 30%
2010	Lt. Governor	Maldonado 65% - 23%
2010	Secretary of State	Dunn 63% - 29%
2010	Attorney General	Cooley 70% - 22%
2010	Treasurer	Walters 59% - 34%
2010	Controller	Strickland 58% - 34%
2012	President	Romney 67% - 33%
2014	Governor	Kashkari 68% - 32%
2016	President	Trump 63% - 32%
2018	Governor	Cox 66% - 34%
2018	Attorney General	Bailey 66% - 34%
2020	President	Trump 61% - 36%
2022	Senate (Reg.)	Meuser 68% - 32%
2022	Governor	Dahle 70% - 30%
2022	Lt. Governor	Underwood Jacobs 68% - 32%
2022	Secretary of State	Bernosky 68% - 32%
2022	Attorney General	Hochman 69% - 31%
2022	Treasurer	Guerrero 68% - 32%
2022	Controller	Chen 71% - 29%
2024	President	Trump 64% - 34%
2024	Senate (Reg.)	Garvey 66% - 34%

== Composition ==
FIPS County Code	County	Seat	Population
19	Fresno	Fresno	1,017,162
29	Kern	Bakersfield	913,820
31	Kings	Hanford	152,682
107	Tulare	Visalia	479,468

=== Cities and CDPs with 10,000 or more people ===
- Fresno – 542,107
- Bakersfield – 403,455
- Visalia – 141,384
- Clovis – 120,124
- Tulare – 68,875
- Hanford – 57,990
- Oildale – 36,135
- Ridgecrest – 27,959
- Lemoore – 27,038
- Rosamond – 20,961
- Lakeside – 20,648
- Rosedale – 18,639
- Tehachapi – 10,881

=== 2,500 – 10,000 people ===
- Golden Hills – 9,578
- Taft – 8,546
- Lemoore Station – 6,568
- Bear Valley Springs – 5,592
- Greenacres – 5,496
- Mojave – 4,699
- Ford City – 4,348
- Tarpey Village – 3,997
- Lake Isabella – 3,573
- Yokuts Valley – 3,564
- Auberry – 3,238
- Stallion Springs – 3,139
- Weldon – 2,645
- Frazier Park – 2,592

== List of members representing the district ==
Member	Party	Dates	Cong ress	Electoral history	Counties
District created March 4, 1933
George Burnham (San Diego)	Republican	March 4, 1933 – January 3, 1937	73rd 74th	Elected in 1932. Re-elected in 1934. Retired.	1933–1943; Imperial, San Diego
Edouard Izac (San Diego)	Democratic	January 3, 1937 – January 3, 1943	75th 76th 77th	Elected in 1936. Re-elected in 1938. Re-elected in 1940. Redistricted to the 23rd district.	1933–1943; Imperial, San Diego
John Carl Hinshaw (Pasadena)	Republican	January 3, 1943 – August 5, 1956	78th 79th 80th 81st 82nd 83rd 84th	Redistricted from the 11th district and re-elected in 1942. Re-elected in 1944. Re-elected in 1946. Re-elected in 1948. Re-elected in 1950. Re-elected in 1952. Re-elected in 1954. Died.	1943–1975; Los Angeles
Vacant		August 5, 1956 – January 3, 1957	84th		1943–1975; Los Angeles
H. Allen Smith (Glendale)	Republican	January 3, 1957 – January 3, 1973	85th 86th 87th 88th 89th 90th 91st 92nd	Elected in 1956. Re-elected in 1958. Re-elected in 1960. Re-elected in 1962. Re-elected in 1964. Re-elected in 1966. Re-elected in 1968. Re-elected in 1970. Retired.	1943–1975; Los Angeles
Carlos Moorhead (Los Angeles)	Republican	January 3, 1973 – January 3, 1975	93rd	Elected in 1972. Redistricted to the 22nd district.	1943–1975; Los Angeles
Barry Goldwater Jr. (Los Angeles)	Republican	January 3, 1975 – January 3, 1983	94th 95th 96th 97th	Redistricted from the 27th district and re-elected in 1974. Re-elected in 1976. Re-elected in 1978. Re-elected in 1980. Retired to run for U.S. senator.	1975–1983; Southwestern Los Angeles, eastern Ventura
Bill Thomas (Bakersfield)	Republican	January 3, 1983 – January 3, 1993	98th 99th 100th 101st 102nd	Redistricted from the 18th district and re-elected in 1982. Re-elected in 1984. Re-elected in 1986. Re-elected in 1988. Re-elected in 1990. Redistricted to the 21st district.	1983–1993; Inyo, Kern, Los Angeles (Lancaster), San Luis Obispo
Cal Dooley (Fresno)	Democratic	January 3, 1993 – January 3, 2005	103rd 104th 105th 106th 107th 108th	Redistricted from the 17th district and re-elected in 1992. Re-elected in 1994. Re-elected in 1996. Re-elected in 1998. Re-elected in 2000. Re-elected in 2002. Retired.	1993–2003; Western Fresno, northwestern Kern, Kings, western Tulare
Cal Dooley (Fresno)	Democratic	January 3, 1993 – January 3, 2005	103rd 104th 105th 106th 107th 108th	Redistricted from the 17th district and re-elected in 1992. Re-elected in 1994. Re-elected in 1996. Re-elected in 1998. Re-elected in 2000. Re-elected in 2002. Retired.	2003–2013 Western Fresno, northwestern Kern, Kings
Jim Costa (Fresno)	Democratic	January 3, 2005 – January 3, 2013	109th 110th 111th 112th	Elected in 2004. Re-elected in 2006. Re-elected in 2008. Re-elected in 2010. Redistricted to the 16th district.	2003–2013 Western Fresno, northwestern Kern, Kings
Sam Farr (Carmel)	Democratic	January 3, 2013 – January 3, 2017	113th 114th	Redistricted from the 17th district and re-elected in 2012. Re-elected in 2014. Retired.	2013–2023 Monterey and San Benito, and portions of Santa Clara and Santa Cruz
Jimmy Panetta (Carmel Valley)	Democratic	January 3, 2017 – January 3, 2023	115th 116th 117th	Elected in 2016. Re-elected in 2018. Re-elected in 2020. Redistricted to the 19th district.	2013–2023 Monterey and San Benito, and portions of Santa Clara and Santa Cruz
Kevin McCarthy (Bakersfield)	Republican	January 3, 2023 – December 31, 2023	118th	Redistricted from the 23rd district and re-elected in 2022. Resigned.	2023–present Parts of the southern San Joaquin Valley, the Tehachapi Mountains and southern Sierra Nevada, and the northwestern Mojave Desert
Vacant		December 31, 2023 – June 3, 2024	118th		2023–present Parts of the southern San Joaquin Valley, the Tehachapi Mountains and southern Sierra Nevada, and the northwestern Mojave Desert
Vince Fong (Bakersfield)	Republican	June 3, 2024 – present	118th 119th	Elected to finish McCarthy's term. Re-elected in 2024. Re-elected in 2026.	2023–present Parts of the southern San Joaquin Valley, the Tehachapi Mountains and southern Sierra Nevada, and the northwestern Mojave Desert

== Election results ==
=== 1932 ===
1932 United States House of Representatives elections in California, 20th district
Party	Candidate	Votes	%
Republican	George Burnham	43,757	50.3
Democratic	Claude Chandler	43,304	49.7
Total votes		87,061	100.0
Republican hold			

=== 1934 ===
1934 United States House of Representatives elections in California, 20th district
Party	Candidate	Votes	%
Republican	George Burnham (Incumbent)	51,682	52.4
Democratic	Edouard Izac	46,957	47.6
Total votes		98,639	100.0
Republican hold			

=== 1936 ===
1936 United States House of Representatives elections in California, 20th district
Party	Candidate	Votes	%
Democratic	Edouard Izac	59,208	56.4
Republican	Ed P. Simple	44,925	42.8
Communist	Esco L. Richardson	916	0.8
Total votes		105,049	100.0
Democratic gain from Republican			

=== 1938 ===
1938 United States House of Representatives elections in California, 20th district
Party	Candidate	Votes	%
Democratic	Edouard Izac (Incumbent)	65,243	60.4
Republican	John L. Bacon	42,710	39.6
Total votes		107,953	100.0
Democratic hold			

=== 1940 ===
1940 United States House of Representatives elections in California, 20th district
Party	Candidate	Votes	%
Democratic	Edouard Izac (Incumbent)	69,874	51.1
Republican	John L. Bacon	66,132	48.3
Communist	Esco L. Richardson	806	0.6
Total votes		136,812	100.0
Democratic hold			

=== 1942 ===
1942 United States House of Representatives elections in California, 20th district
Party	Candidate	Votes	%
Republican	John Carl Hinshaw	62,628	48.4
Democratic	Joseph O. Donovan	55,479	42.9
Prohibition	Virgil G. Hinshaw	6,864	5.3
Townsend	Janie Bele McCarty	3,537	2.7
Communist	Orla E. Lair	792	0.6
Total votes		129,300	100.0
Republican gain from Democratic			

=== 1944 ===
1944 United States House of Representatives elections in California, 20th district
Party	Candidate	Votes	%
Republican	John Carl Hinshaw (Incumbent)	112,663	51.8
Democratic	Archibald B. Young	101,090	46.5
Prohibition	Charles Hiram Randall	3,615	1.5
Total votes		217,368	100.0
Republican hold			

=== 1946 ===
1946 United States House of Representatives elections in California, 20th district
Party	Candidate	Votes	%
Republican	John Carl Hinshaw (Incumbent)	98,283	63.2
Democratic	Everett G. Burkhalter	67,317	36.8
Total votes		165,600	100.0
Republican hold			

=== 1948 ===
1948 United States House of Representatives elections in California, 20th district
Party	Candidate	Votes	%
Republican	John Carl Hinshaw (Incumbent)	204,710	81.6
Democratic	William B. Esterman	46,232	18.4
Total votes		250,942	100.0
Republican hold			

=== 1950 ===
1950 United States House of Representatives elections in California, 20th district
Party	Candidate	Votes	%
Republican	John Carl Hinshaw (Incumbent)	211,012	85.1
Progressive	Myra Tanner Weiss	26,508	10.7
Prohibition	Frank Nelson	10,339	4.2
Total votes		247,859	100.0
Republican hold			

=== 1952 ===
1952 United States House of Representatives elections in California, 20th district
Party	Candidate	Votes	%
Republican	John Carl Hinshaw (Incumbent)	109,509	100.0
Republican hold			

=== 1954 ===
1954 United States House of Representatives elections in California, 20th district
Party	Candidate	Votes	%
Republican	John Carl Hinshaw (Incumbent)	71,213	71.2
Democratic	Eugene Radding	28,838	28.8
Total votes		100,051	100.0
Republican hold			

=== 1956 ===
1956 United States House of Representatives elections in California, 20th district
Party	Candidate	Votes	%
Republican	H. Allen Smith	85,459	70.8
Democratic	Eugene Radding	35,249	29.2
Total votes		120,708	100.0
Republican hold			

=== 1958 ===
1958 United States House of Representatives elections in California, 20th district
Party	Candidate	Votes	%
Republican	H. Allen Smith (Incumbent)	72,311	66
Democratic	Eugene Radding	37,331	34
Total votes		109,642	100.0
Republican hold			

=== 1960 ===
1960 United States House of Representatives elections in California, 20th district
Party	Candidate	Votes	%
Republican	H. Allen Smith (Incumbent)	90,214	70.1
Democratic	Eugene Radding	38,497	29.9
Total votes		128,711	100.0
Republican hold			

=== 1962 ===
1962 United States House of Representatives elections in California, 20th district
Party	Candidate	Votes	%
Republican	H. Allen Smith (Incumbent)	119,938	70.6
Democratic	Leon Mayer	49,850	29.4
Total votes		169,788	100.0
Republican hold			

=== 1964 ===
1964 United States House of Representatives elections in California, 20th district
Party	Candidate	Votes	%
Republican	H. Allen Smith (Incumbent)	132,402	67.9
Democratic	C. Bernard Kaufman	62,645	32.1
Total votes		195,047	100.0
Republican hold			

=== 1966 ===
1966 United States House of Representatives elections in California, 20th district
Party	Candidate	Votes	%
Republican	H. Allen Smith (Incumbent)	128,896	73.4
Democratic	Raymond Freschi	46,730	26.6
Total votes		175,626	100.0
Republican hold			

=== 1968 ===
1968 United States House of Representatives elections in California, 20th district
Party	Candidate	Votes	%
Republican	H. Allen Smith (Incumbent)	133,148	69.3
Democratic	Don White	56,008	29.2
Peace and Freedom	Robert J. Clarke	2,965	1.5
Total votes		192,121	100.0
Republican hold			

=== 1970 ===
1970 United States House of Representatives elections in California, 20th district
Party	Candidate	Votes	%
Republican	H. Allen Smith (Incumbent)	116,437	69.1
Democratic	Michael M. Stolzberg	50,033	29.7
American Independent	Earl C. Harper	2,100	1.2
Total votes		168,570	100.0
Republican hold			

=== 1972 ===
1972 United States House of Representatives elections in California, 20th district
Party	Candidate	Votes	%
Republican	Carlos Moorhead	120,299	57.4
Democratic	John Binkley	89,219	42.6
Total votes		209,518	100.0
Republican hold			

=== 1974 ===
1974 United States House of Representatives elections in California, 20th district
Party	Candidate	Votes	%
Republican	Barry Goldwater Jr.	96,324	61.2
Democratic	Arline M. Mathews	61,119	38.8
Total votes		157,443	100.0
Republican hold			

=== 1976 ===
1976 United States House of Representatives elections in California, 20th district
Party	Candidate	Votes	%
Republican	Barry Goldwater Jr. (Incumbent)	146,158	67.2
Democratic	Patty Lear Corman	71,193	32.8
Total votes		217,351	100.0
Republican hold			

=== 1978 ===
1978 United States House of Representatives elections in California, 20th district
Party	Candidate	Votes	%
Republican	Barry Goldwater Jr. (Incumbent)	129,714	66.4
Democratic	Pat Lear	65,695	33.6
Total votes		195,409	100.0
Republican hold			

=== 1980 ===
1980 United States House of Representatives elections in California, 20th district
Party	Candidate	Votes	%
Republican	Barry Goldwater Jr. (Incumbent)	199,674	78.8
Democratic	Matt Miller	43,024	17.0
Libertarian	Christopher R. Darwin	10,605	4.2
Total votes		253,303	100.0
Republican hold			

=== 1982 ===
1982 United States House of Representatives elections in California, 20th district
Party	Candidate	Votes	%
Republican	Bill Thomas	123,312	68.1
Democratic	Robert J. Bethea	57,769	31.9
Total votes		181,081	100.0
Republican hold			

=== 1984 ===
1984 United States House of Representatives elections in California, 20th district
Party	Candidate	Votes	%
Republican	Bill Thomas (Incumbent)	151,732	70.9
Democratic	Michael T. LeSage	62,307	29.1
Total votes		214,039	100.0
Republican hold			

=== 1986 ===
1986 United States House of Representatives elections in California, 20th district
Party	Candidate	Votes	%
Republican	Bill Thomas (Incumbent)	129,989	72.6
Democratic	Jules H. Moquin	49,027	27.4
Total votes		179,016	100.0
Republican hold			

=== 1988 ===
1988 United States House of Representatives elections in California, 20th district
Party	Candidate	Votes	%
Republican	Bill Thomas (Incumbent)	162,779	71.1
Democratic	Lita Reid	62,037	27.1
Libertarian	David L. Bersohn	4,190	1.8
Total votes		229,006	100.0
Republican hold			

=== 1990 ===
1990 United States House of Representatives elections in California, 20th district
Party	Candidate	Votes	%
Republican	Bill Thomas (Incumbent)	112,962	59.8
Democratic	Michael A. Thomas	65,101	34.5
Libertarian	William Howard Dilbeck	10,555	5.6
No party	Reid (write-in)	307	0.2
Total votes		188,925	100.0
Republican hold			

=== 1992 ===
1992 United States House of Representatives elections in California, 20th district
Party	Candidate	Votes	%
Democratic	Cal Dooley	72,679	64.9
Republican	Ed Hunt	39,388	35.1
Total votes		112,067	100.0
Democratic gain from Republican			

=== 1994 ===
1994 United States House of Representatives elections in California, 20th district
Party	Candidate	Votes	%
Democratic	Cal Dooley (Incumbent)	57,394	56.70
Republican	Paul Young	43,836	43.30
Total votes		101,230	100.0
Democratic hold			

=== 1996 ===
1996 United States House of Representatives elections in California, 20th district
Party	Candidate	Votes	%
Democratic	Cal Dooley (Incumbent)	65,381	56.6
Republican	Trice Harvey	45,276	39.1
Libertarian	Jonathan Richter	5,048	4.3
Total votes		115,705	100.0
Democratic hold			

=== 1998 ===
1998 United States House of Representatives elections in California, 20th district
Party	Candidate	Votes	%
Democratic	Cal Dooley (Incumbent)	60,599	60.73
Republican	Cliff Unruh	39,183	39.27
Total votes		99,782	100.0
Democratic hold			

=== 2000 ===
2000 United States House of Representatives elections in California, 20th district
Party	Candidate	Votes	%
Democratic	Cal Dooley (Incumbent)	66,235	52.4
Republican	Rich Rodriguez	57,563	45.5
Natural Law	Walter Kenneth Ruehlig	1,416	1.1
Libertarian	Arnold Kriegbaum	1,320	1.0
Total votes		126,534	100.0
Democratic hold			

=== 2002 ===
2002 United States House of Representatives elections in California, 20th district
Party	Candidate	Votes	%
Democratic	Cal Dooley (Incumbent)	47,627	63.7
Republican	Andre Minuth	25,628	34.3
Libertarian	Varrin Swearingen	1,515	2.0
Turnout		74,770	
Democratic hold			

=== 2004 ===
2004 United States House of Representatives elections in California, 20th district
Party	Candidate	Votes	%
Democratic	Jim Costa	61,005	53.5
Republican	Roy Ashburn	53,231	46.5
Total votes		114,236	100.0
Democratic hold			

=== 2006 ===
2006 United States House of Representatives elections in California, 20th district
Party	Candidate	Votes	%
Democratic	Jim Costa (Incumbent)	61,120	100.0
Democratic hold			

=== 2008 ===
2008 United States House of Representatives elections in California, 20th district
Party	Candidate	Votes	%
Democratic	Jim Costa (Incumbent)	93,023	74.33
Republican	Jim Lopez	32,118	25.67
Total votes		125,141	100.0
Turnout			60.55
Democratic hold			

=== 2010 ===
2010 United States House of Representatives elections in California, 20th district
Party	Candidate	Votes	%
Democratic	Jim Costa (Incumbent)	46,247	51.71
Republican	Andy Vidak	43,197	48.29
Total votes		89,444	100.00
Democratic hold			

=== 2012 ===
2012 United States House of Representatives elections in California, 20th district
Party	Candidate	Votes	%
Democratic	Sam Farr (Incumbent)	172,996	74.1
Republican	Jeff Taylor	60,566	25.9
Total votes		233,562	100.0
Democratic hold			

=== 2014 ===
2014 United States House of Representatives elections in California, 20th district
Party	Candidate	Votes	%
Democratic	Sam Farr (Incumbent)	106,034	75.2
Republican	Ronald Paul Kabat	35,010	24.8
Total votes		141,044	100.0
Democratic hold			

=== 2016 ===
2016 United States House of Representatives elections in California, 20th district
Party	Candidate	Votes	%
Democratic	Jimmy Panetta	180,980	70.8
Republican	Casey Lucius	74,811	29.2
Total votes		255,791	100.0
Democratic hold			

=== 2018 ===
2018 United States House of Representatives elections in California, 20th district
Party	Candidate	Votes	%
Democratic	Jimmy Panetta (Incumbent)	183,677	81.4
No party preference	Ronald Paul Kabat	42,044	18.6
Total votes		225,721	100.0
Democratic hold			

=== 2020 ===
2020 United States House of Representatives elections in California, 20th district
Party	Candidate	Votes	%
Democratic	Jimmy Panetta (incumbent)	236,896	76.8
Republican	Jeff Gorman	71,658	23.2
Total votes		308,554	100.0
Democratic hold			

=== 2022 ===
2022 United States House of Representatives elections in California, 20th district
Party	Candidate	Votes	%
Republican	Kevin McCarthy (incumbent)	153,847	67.2
Democratic	Marisa Wood	74,934	32.8
Total votes		228,781	100.0
Republican gain from Democratic			

=== 2024 (special) ===
2024 California's 20th congressional district special election
Party	Candidate	Votes	%	±%
Republican	Vince Fong	50.442	60.6%	N/A
Republican	Mike Boudreaux	32,777	39.4%	N/A
Total votes		68,134	100.0%	
Republican hold				

=== 2024 (general) ===
2024 United States House of Representatives elections in California, 20th district
Party	Candidate	Votes	%
Republican	Vince Fong (incumbent)	187,862	65.1
Republican	Mike Boudreaux (withdrawn)	100,926	34.9
Total votes		228,788	100.0
Republican hold			

== Historical district boundaries ==
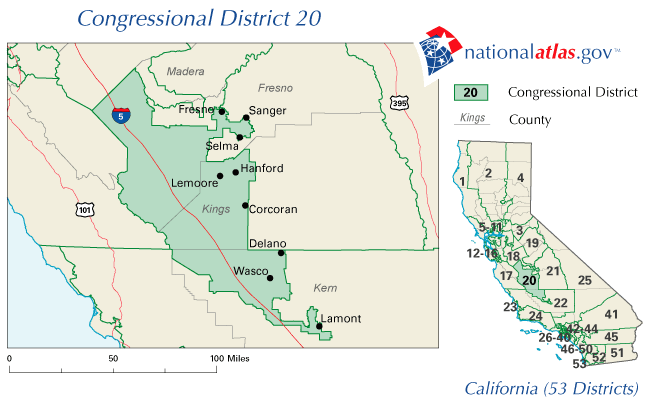
2003 – 2013

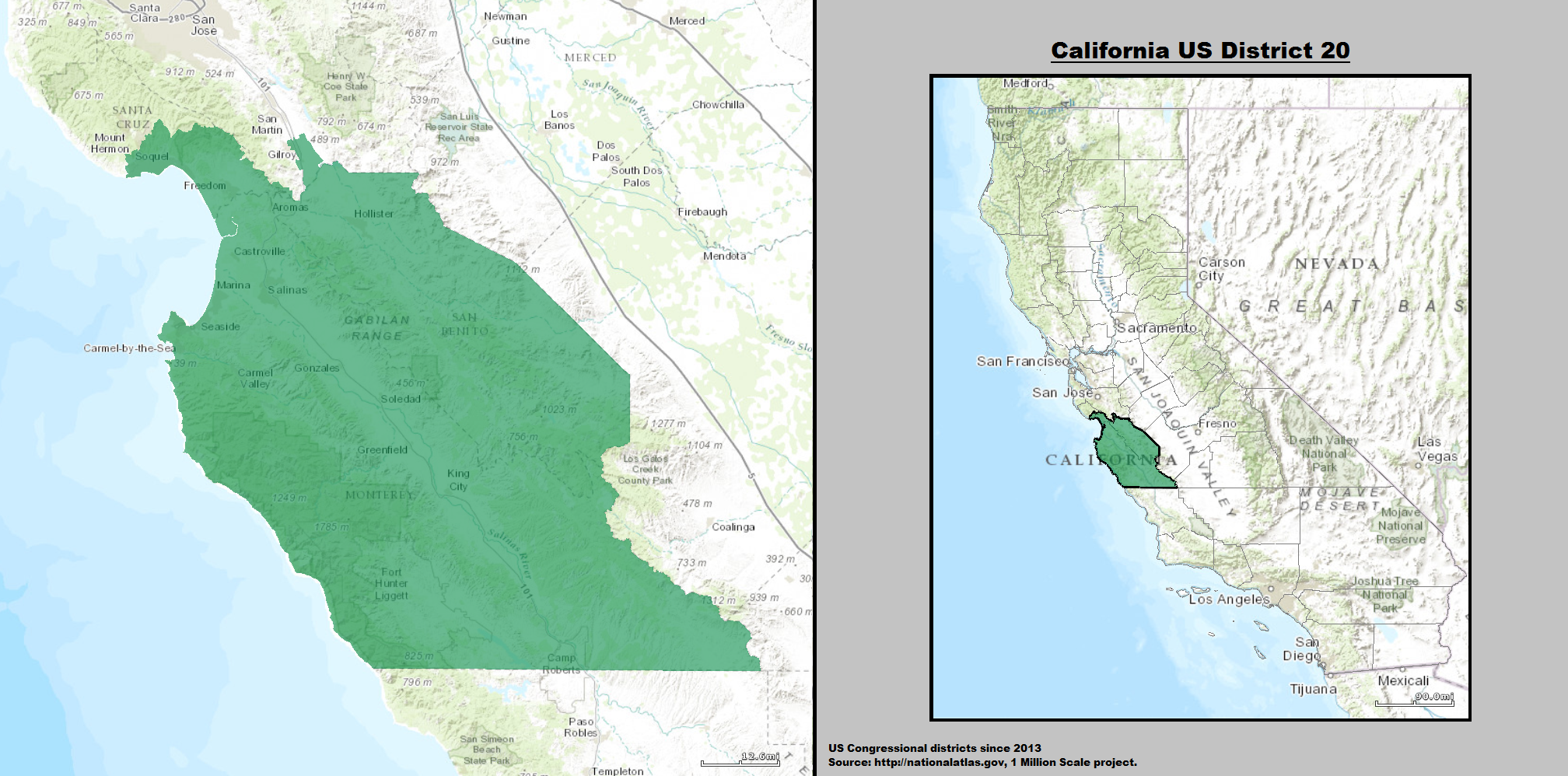
2013 – 2023

== See also ==
- List of United States congressional districts
- California's congressional districts

== Notes ==
U.S. House of Representatives
Preceded by California's 12th congressional district	Home district of the speaker January 7, 2023 — October 3, 2023	Succeeded by Louisiana's 4th congressional district
