= Carlos Moorhead =

American politician

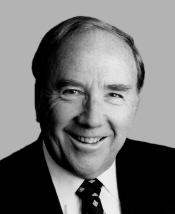

Member of the U.S. House of Representatives from California
- In office January 3, 1973 – January 3, 1997
- Preceded by: H. Allen Smith
- Succeeded by: James E. Rogan
- Constituency: 20th district (1973–1975); 22nd district (1975–1993); 27th district (1993–1997)

Member of the California State Assembly from the 43rd district
- In office January 7, 1967 – January 3, 1973
- Preceded by: Howard J. Thelin
- Succeeded by: Michael D. Antonovich

Personal details
- Born: Carlos John Moorhead; May 6, 1922 Long Beach, California, U.S.
- Died: November 23, 2011 (aged 89) La Cañada Flintridge, California, U.S.
- Party: Republican
- Spouse: Valery Tyler Moorhead
- Children: Steve, Teri, and Paul Bradford (step children). Preceded in death by two daughters (Teresa and Cathy)
- Education: UCLA

Carlos John Moorhead (May 5, 1922 – November 23, 2011) was an American lawyer and politician who served twelve terms as a United States Congressman from California from 1973 to 1997.

== Early life and education ==
Born in Long Beach, he attended the public schools of Glendale, graduated from Herbert Hoover High School (Glendale) in 1940 and earned a B.A. from UCLA in 1943 and a J.D. from the University of Southern California Law School in 1949.

== World War II ==
He served in the United States Army from 1942 to 1945 and attained the rank of lieutenant colonel.

== Career ==
Moorhead was admitted to the California State Bar in 1949 and commenced practice in Glendale; he was admitted to practice before the United States Supreme Court in 1973, and was a member of the California Law Revision Commission.

=== California assembly ===
From 1967 to 1973, he was a member of the California State Assembly for the 43rd district.

=== Congress ===
He was elected as a Republican to the 93rd and to the eleven succeeding Congresses, serving from January 3, 1973, to January 3, 1997. He was best known for supporting President Richard Nixon during impeachment hearings, voting ‘no’ on all three articles of impeachment.

He was not a candidate for reelection to the 105th Congress.

== Death ==
He died after a long battle with Alzheimer's disease in 2011.

== Electoral history ==
1972 United States House of Representatives elections in California, 20th district
Party	Candidate	Votes	%
Republican	Carlos Moorhead	120,299	57.4
Democratic	John Binkley	89,219	42.6
Total votes		209,518	100.0
Republican hold			

1974 United States House of Representatives elections
Party	Candidate	Votes	%
Republican	Carlos Moorhead (incumbent)	78,983	55.8%
Democratic	Richard Hallin	62,770	44.2%
Total votes		141,753	100.0%
Turnout			
Republican gain from Democratic			

1976 United States House of Representatives elections
Party	Candidate	Votes	%
Republican	Carlos Moorhead (incumbent)	114,769	62.6%
Democratic	Robert S. Henry	68,543	37.4%
Total votes		183,312	100.0%
Turnout			
Republican hold			

1978 United States House of Representatives elections
Party	Candidate	Votes	%
Republican	Carlos Moorhead (incumbent)	99,502	64.6%
Democratic	Robert S. Henry	54,442	35.4%
Total votes		153,944	100.0%
Turnout			
Republican hold			

1980 United States House of Representatives elections
Party	Candidate	Votes	%
Republican	Carlos Moorhead (incumbent)	115,241	63.9%
Democratic	Pierce O'Donnell	57,477	31.9%
Libertarian	William V. Susel	7,705	4.3%
Total votes		180,423	100.0%
Turnout			
Republican hold			

1982 United States House of Representatives elections
Party	Candidate	Votes	%
Republican	Carlos Moorhead (incumbent)	145,831	73.6%
Democratic	Harvey L. Goldhammer	46,521	23.5%
Libertarian	Robert T. Gerringer	5,870	3.0%
Total votes		198,222	100.0%
Turnout			
Republican hold			

1984 United States House of Representatives elections
Party	Candidate	Votes	%
Republican	Carlos Moorhead (incumbent)	184,981	85.2%
Libertarian	Michael B. Yauch	32,036	14.8%
Total votes		217,017	100.0%
Turnout			
Republican hold			

1986 United States House of Representatives elections
Party	Candidate	Votes	%
Republican	Carlos Moorhead (incumbent)	141,096	73.8%
Democratic	John G. Simmons	44,036	23.0%
Libertarian	Jona Joy Bergland	3,114	1.6%
Peace and Freedom	Joel Lorimer	2,930	1.5%
Total votes		191,176	100.0%
Turnout			
Republican hold			

1988 United States House of Representatives elections
Party	Candidate	Votes	%
Republican	Carlos Moorhead (incumbent)	164,699	69.5%
Democratic	John G. Simmons	61,555	26.0%
Peace and Freedom	Shirley Rachel Isaacson	6,298	2.7%
Libertarian	Ted Brown	4,259	1.8%
Total votes		235,811	100.0%
Turnout			
Republican hold			

1990 United States House of Representatives elections
Party	Candidate	Votes	%
Republican	Carlos Moorhead (incumbent)	108,634	60.0%
Democratic	David Bayer	61,630	34.1%
Libertarian	William H. Wilson	6,702	3.7%
Peace and Freedom	Jan B. Tucker	3,963	2.2%
Total votes		180,929	100.0%
Turnout			
Republican hold			

1992 United States House of Representatives elections in California
Party	Candidate	Votes	%
Republican	Carlos Moorhead (Incumbent)	105,521	49.7
Democratic	Doug Kahn	83,805	39.4
Green	Jesse A. Moorman	11,003	5.2
Peace and Freedom	Margaret L. Edwards	7,329	3.5
Libertarian	Dennis Decherd	4,790	2.3
Independent	Ballantyne (write-in)	2	0.0
Total votes		212,450	100.0
Republican hold			

1994 United States House of Representatives elections in California
Party	Candidate	Votes	%
Republican	Carlos Moorhead (Incumbent)	88,341	53.0
Democratic	Doug Kahn	70,267	42.1
American Independent	Bill Gibbs	4,328	2.6
Libertarian	Dennis Decherd	3,838	2.3
Total votes		166,774	100.0
Republican hold			

U.S. House of Representatives
Preceded by H. Allen Smith	Member of the U.S. House of Representatives from California's 20th congressional district 1973–1975	Succeeded by Barry Goldwater Jr.
Preceded by Del M. Clawson	Member of the U.S. House of Representatives from California's 22nd congressional district 1975–1993	Succeeded by Michael Huffington
Preceded by Mel Levine	Member of the U.S. House of Representatives from California's 27th congressional district 1993–1997	Succeeded by James E. Rogan
Preceded by Norman F. Lent	Ranking Member of the House Energy and Commerce Committee; 1993–1995	Succeeded by John Dingell
