= C. Don Field =

American politician

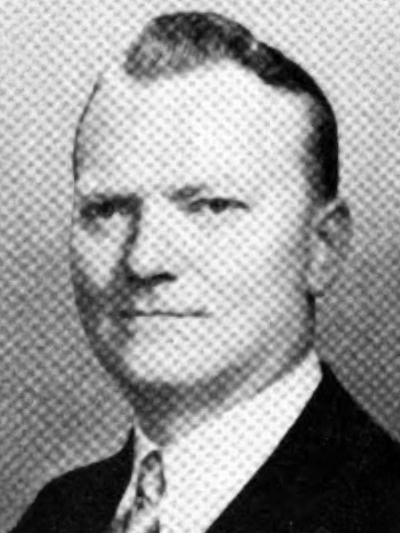
- Official portrait, 1942

Member of the California State Assembly from the 43rd district
- In office January 2, 1933 – January 3, 1949
- Preceded by: Chris N. Jespersen
- Succeeded by: H. Allen Smith

Personal details
- Born: February 14, 1899 Aledo, Texas
- Died: June 9, 1952 (aged 53) California
- Party: Republican

Military service
- Branch/service: United States Army
- Battles/wars: World War I

Charles Donald Field (February 14, 1899 – June 6, 1952) served in the California State Assembly for the 43rd district from 1933 to 1949. During World War I he served in the United States Army.

He was married to Gladys Field (born 1906) and the two had a son, C. Don Jr. (born 1940), and daughter.
