= California's 27th congressional district =

U.S. House district for California

Coordinates: 34°15′54″N 117°56′06″W

- Interactive map of district boundaries
- Representative: George Whitesides; D–Agua Dulce
- Population (2025): 739,349
- Median household income: $101,333
- Ethnicity: 42.4% Hispanic; 33.8% White; 9.8% Black; 9.0% Asian; 4.0% Two or more races; 1.1% other
- Cook PVI: D+3

California's 27th congressional district is a congressional district in the U.S. state of California. The district is currently represented by Democrat George T. Whitesides.

The district includes most of northern Los Angeles County, including the cities of Santa Clarita, Palmdale, and Lancaster, and parts of the northwestern San Fernando Valley in the city of Los Angeles. Prior to redistricting in 2022, the district was located in the San Gabriel Valley.

== Recent election results from statewide races ==
=== 2023–2027 boundaries ===
Year	Office	Results
2008	President	Obama 52% - 48%
2010	Governor	Whitman 52% - 41%
2010	Lt. Governor	Maldonado 46% - 40%
2010	Secretary of State	Dunn 50% - 41%
2010	Attorney General	Cooley 59% - 33%
2010	Treasurer	Walters 47% - 46%
2010	Controller	Strickland 50% - 42%
2012	President	Obama 49% - 48%
2014	Governor	Kashkari 56% - 44%
2016	President	Clinton 52% - 42%
2018	Governor	Newsom 53% - 47%
2018	Attorney General	Becerra 54% - 46%
2020	President	Biden 55% - 43%
2022	Senate (Reg.)	Padilla 51% - 49%
2022	Governor	Dahle 51% - 49%
2022	Lt. Governor	Underwood Jacobs 51% - 49%
2022	Secretary of State	Bernosky 50.03% - 49.97%
2022	Attorney General	Hochman 51% - 49%
2022	Treasurer	Guerrero 51% - 49%
2022	Controller	Chen 54% - 46%
2024	President	Harris 50% - 47%
2024	Senate (Reg.)	Schiff 51% - 49%

== Composition ==
FIPS County Code	County	Seat	Population
37	Los Angeles	Los Angeles	9,663,345

Under the 2020 redistricting, California's 27th congressional district is located in Southern California, encompassing most of northern Los Angeles County. It includes the cities of Santa Clarita, Lancaster, and Palmdale; the census-designated places Stevenson Ranch, Val Verde, Hasley Canyon, Castaic, Lake Hughes, Elizabeth Lake, Green Valley, Agua Dulce, Acton, Leona Valley, Quartz Hill, Desert View Highlands, Littlerock, and Sun Village; the neighborhoods of Porter Ranch and Granada Hills in the city of Los Angeles; along with the Sierra Pelona Mountains and the northern slopes of the San Gabriel Mountains.

=== Cities and census-designated places with 10,000 or more people ===
- Los Angeles – 3,820,914
- Santa Clarita - 228,673
- Lancaster - 173,516
- Palmdale - 169,450
- Stevenson Ranch – 20,178
- Castaic – 18,937
- Sun Village – 12,345
- Quartz Hill – 11,447

=== 2,500 – 10,000 people ===
- Acton – 7,431
- Agua Dulce – 3,451
- Desert View Highlands – 2,676

== List of members representing the district ==
Member	Party	Dates	Cong ress(es)	Electoral history	Counties
District created January 3, 1953
Harry R. Sheppard (Yucaipa)	Democratic	January 3, 1953 – January 3, 1963	83rd 84th 85th 86th 87th	Redistricted from the 21st district and re-elected in 1952. Re-elected in 1954. Re-elected in 1956. Re-elected in 1958. Re-elected in 1960. Redistricted to the 33rd district.	1953–1963; San Bernardino
Everett G. Burkhalter (Los Angeles)	Democratic	January 3, 1963 – January 3, 1965	88th	Elected in 1962. Retired.	1963–1969; Los Angeles
Edwin Reinecke (Tujunga)	Republican	January 3, 1965 – January 21, 1969	89th 90th 91st	Elected in 1964. Re-elected in 1966. Re-elected in 1968. Resigned to become Lieutenant Governor of California.	1963–1969; Los Angeles
Edwin Reinecke (Tujunga)	Republican	January 3, 1965 – January 21, 1969	89th 90th 91st	Elected in 1964. Re-elected in 1966. Re-elected in 1968. Resigned to become Lieutenant Governor of California.	1969–1973; Los Angeles
Vacant		January 21, 1969 – April 29, 1969	91st		1969–1973; Los Angeles
Barry Goldwater Jr (Burbank)	Republican	April 29, 1969 – January 3, 1975	91st 92nd 93rd	Elected to finish Reinecke's term. Re-elected in 1970. Re-elected in 1972. Redistricted to the 20th district.	1969–1973; Los Angeles
Barry Goldwater Jr (Burbank)	Republican	April 29, 1969 – January 3, 1975	91st 92nd 93rd	Elected to finish Reinecke's term. Re-elected in 1970. Re-elected in 1972. Redistricted to the 20th district.	1973–1975; Los Angeles, Southern Ventura
Alphonzo E. Bell Jr. (Los Angeles)	Republican	January 3, 1975 – January 3, 1977	94th	Redistricted from the 28th district and re-elected in 1974. Retired to run for U.S. Senator.	1975–1983; Los Angeles
Bob Dornan (Los Angeles)	Republican	January 3, 1977 – January 3, 1983	95th 96th 97th	Elected in 1976. Re-elected in 1978. Re-elected in 1980. Retired to run for U.S. Senator.	1975–1983; Los Angeles
Mel Levine (Los Angeles)	Democratic	January 3, 1983 – January 3, 1993	98th 99th 100th 101st 102nd	Elected in 1982. Re-elected in 1984. Re-elected in 1986. Re-elected in 1988. Re-elected in 1990. Retired.	1983–1993; Western Los Angeles (Manhattan/Redondo Beach, Santa Monica)
Carlos Moorhead (Glendale)	Republican	January 3, 1993 – January 3, 1997	103rd 104th	Redistricted from the 22nd district and re-elected in 1992. Re-elected in 1994. Retired.	1993–2003; Los Angeles (Burbank, Glendale, Pasadena)
Jim Rogan (Glendale)	Republican	January 3, 1997 – January 3, 2001	105th 106th	Elected in 1996. Re-elected in 1998. Lost re-election.	1993–2003; Los Angeles (Burbank, Glendale, Pasadena)
Adam Schiff (Burbank)	Democratic	January 3, 2001 – January 3, 2003	107th	Elected in 2000. Redistricted to the 29th district.	1993–2003; Los Angeles (Burbank, Glendale, Pasadena)
Brad Sherman (Los Angeles)	Democratic	January 3, 2003 – January 3, 2013	108th 109th 110th 111th 112th	Redistricted from the 24th district and re-elected in 2002. Re-elected in 2004. Re-elected in 2006. Re-elected in 2008. Re-elected in 2010. Redistricted to the 30th district.	2003–2013 Parts of Western Los Angeles County including Northridge and Reseda
Judy Chu (Monterey Park)	Democratic	January 3, 2013 – January 3, 2023	113th 114th 115th 116th 117th	Redistricted from the 32nd district and re-elected in 2012. Re-elected in 2014. Re-elected in 2016. Re-elected in 2018. Re-elected in 2020. Redistricted to the 28th district.	2013–2023 San Gabriel Foothills including Alhambra and Pasadena
Mike Garcia (Santa Clarita)	Republican	January 3, 2023 – January 3, 2025	118th	Redistricted from the 25th district and re-elected in 2022. Lost re-election.	2023–present Most of northern Los Angeles County including the cities of Santa Clarita & Lancaster
George Whitesides (Agua Dulce)	Democratic	January 3, 2025 – present	119th	Elected in 2024. Re-elected in 2026.	2023–present Most of northern Los Angeles County including the cities of Santa Clarita & Lancaster

== Election results ==
=== 1952 ===
1952 United States House of Representatives elections in California
Party	Candidate	Votes	%
Democratic	Harry R. Sheppard (Incumbent)	68,773	55.0
Republican	Carl B. Hilliard	56,202	45.0
Total votes		124,975	100.0
Democratic hold			

=== 1954 ===
1954 United States House of Representatives elections in California
Party	Candidate	Votes	%
Democratic	Harry R. Sheppard (Incumbent)	65,389	64.8
Republican	Martin K. Barrett	35,594	35.2
Total votes		100,983	100.0
Democratic hold			

=== 1956 ===
1956 United States House of Representatives elections in California
Party	Candidate	Votes	%
Democratic	Harry R. Sheppard (Incumbent)	124,662	100.0
Democratic hold			

=== 1958 ===
1958 United States House of Representatives elections in California
Party	Candidate	Votes	%
Democratic	Harry R. Sheppard (Incumbent)	105,062	72.3
Republican	Robert M. Castle	40,317	27.7
Total votes		145,379	100.0
Democratic hold			

=== 1960 ===
1960 United States House of Representatives elections in California
Party	Candidate	Votes	%
Democratic	Harry R. Sheppard (Incumbent)	123,645	66.8
Republican	Robert M. Castle	61,484	33.2
Total votes		185,129	100.0
Democratic hold			

=== 1962 ===
1962 United States House of Representatives elections in California
Party	Candidate	Votes	%
Democratic	Everett G. Burkhalter	66,979	52.1
Republican	Edgar W. Hiestand (Incumbent)	61,538	47.9
Total votes		128,517	100.0
Democratic gain from Republican			

=== 1964 ===
1964 United States House of Representatives elections in California
Party	Candidate	Votes	%
Republican	Edwin Reinecke	83,141	51.7
Democratic	Tom Bane	77,587	48.3
Total votes		160,734	100.0
Republican gain from Democratic			

=== 1966 ===
1966 United States House of Representatives elections in California
Party	Candidate	Votes	%
Republican	Edwin Reinecke (Incumbent)	93,890	65.3
Democratic	John A. "Jack" Howard	49,785	34.7
Total votes		143,675	100.0
Republican hold			

=== 1968 ===
1968 United States House of Representatives elections in California
Party	Candidate	Votes	%
Republican	Edwin Reinecke (Incumbent)	158,309	72.2
Democratic	John T. Butchko	60,808	27.8
Total votes		219,117	100.0
Republican hold			

=== 1969 (Special) ===
1969 California's 27th congressional district special election
Party	Candidate	Votes	%
Republican	Barry Goldwater Jr.	64,734	56.9
Democratic	John K. Van de Kamp	48,983	43.1
Total votes		113,717	100.0
Republican hold			

=== 1970 ===
1970 United States House of Representatives elections in California
Party	Candidate	Votes	%
Republican	Barry Goldwater Jr. (Incumbent)	139,326	66.6
Democratic	N. "Toni" Kimmel	63,652	30.5
Peace and Freedom	Edward Richer	3,306	1.6
American Independent	John H. Hind	2,642	1.3
Total votes		208,926	100.0
Republican hold			

=== 1972 ===
1972 United States House of Representatives elections in California
Party	Candidate	Votes	%
Republican	Barry Goldwater Jr. (Incumbent)	117,622	57.4
Democratic	Mark S. Novak	87,295	42.6
Total votes		204,917	100.0
Republican hold			

=== 1974 ===
1974 United States House of Representatives elections in California
Party	Candidate	Votes	%
Republican	Alphonzo E. Bell Jr. (Incumbent)	99,645	63.9
Democratic	John Dalessio	50,919	32.5
Peace and Freedom	Jerry Rubin	5,547	3.6
Total votes		156,111	100.0
Republican hold			

=== 1976 ===
1976 United States House of Representatives elections in California
Party	Candidate	Votes	%
Republican	Bob Dornan	114,623	54.7
Democratic	Gary Familian	94,988	45.3
Total votes		209,611	100.0
Republican hold			

=== 1978 ===
1978 United States House of Representatives elections in California
Party	Candidate	Votes	%
Republican	Bob Dornan (Incumbent)	89,392	51.0
Democratic	Carey Peck	85,880	49.0
Total votes		175,272	100.0
Republican hold			

=== 1980 ===
1980 United States House of Representatives elections in California
Party	Candidate	Votes	%
Republican	Bob Dornan (Incumbent)	109,807	51.0
Democratic	Carey Peck	100,061	46.5
Libertarian	Jerome L. "Jerry" Sievers	5,448	2.5
Total votes		215,316	100.0
Republican hold			

=== 1982 ===
1982 United States House of Representatives elections in California
Party	Candidate	Votes	%
Democratic	Mel Levine	108,347	59.5
Republican	Bart W. Christensen	67,479	37.0
Libertarian	ZacK Richardson	6,391	3.5
Total votes		182,217	100.0
Democratic gain from Republican			

=== 1984 ===
1984 United States House of Representatives elections in California
Party	Candidate	Votes	%
Democratic	Mel Levine (Incumbent)	116,933	55.0
Republican	Robert B. Scribner	88,896	41.8
Peace and Freedom	Thomas L. O'Connor Jr.	3,815	1.8
Libertarian	Jeff Avrech	3,137	1.5
Total votes		212,781	100.0
Democratic hold			

=== 1986 ===
1986 United States House of Representatives elections in California
Party	Candidate	Votes	%
Democratic	Mel Levine (Incumbent)	110,403	63.7
Republican	Rob Scribner	59,410	34.3
Peace and Freedom	Thomas L. O'Connor Jr.	2,078	1.2
Libertarian	Larry Leathers	1,429	0.8
Total votes		173,320	100.0
Democratic hold			

=== 1988 ===
1988 United States House of Representatives elections in California
Party	Candidate	Votes	%
Democratic	Mel Levine (Incumbent)	148,814	67.5
Republican	Dennis Galbraith	65,307	29.6
Libertarian	William J. Fulco	6,214	2.8
Total votes		220,335	100.0
Democratic hold			

=== 1990 ===
1990 United States House of Representatives elections in California
Party	Candidate	Votes	%
Democratic	Mel Levine (Incumbent)	90,857	58.2
Republican	David Barrett Cohen	58,140	37.2
Peace and Freedom	Edward E. Ferrer	7,101	4.5
Total votes		156,098	100.0
Democratic hold			

=== 1992 ===
1992 United States House of Representatives elections in California
Party	Candidate	Votes	%
Republican	Carlos Moorhead (Incumbent)	105,521	49.7
Democratic	Doug Kahn	83,805	39.4
Green	Jesse A. Moorman	11,003	5.2
Peace and Freedom	Margaret L. Edwards	7,329	3.5
Libertarian	Dennis Decherd	4,790	2.3
Independent	Ballantyne (write-in)	2	0.0
Total votes		212,450	100.0
Republican hold			

=== 1994 ===
1994 United States House of Representatives elections in California
Party	Candidate	Votes	%
Republican	Carlos Moorhead (Incumbent)	88,341	53.0
Democratic	Doug Kahn	70,267	42.1
American Independent	Bill Gibbs	4,328	2.6
Libertarian	Dennis Decherd	3,838	2.3
Total votes		166,774	100.0
Republican hold			

=== 1996 ===
1996 United States House of Representatives elections in California
Party	Candidate	Votes	%
Republican	Jim Rogan	95,310	50.2
Democratic	Doug Kahn	82,014	43.2
Libertarian	Elizabeth Michael	6,645	3.5
Green	Walt Sheasby	4,195	3.3
Natural Law	Martin Zucker	1,766	0.8
Total votes		189,930	100.0
Republican hold			

=== 1998 ===
1998 United States House of Representatives elections in California
Party	Candidate	Votes	%
Republican	Jim Rogan (Incumbent)	80,702	50.7
Democratic	Barry A. Gordon	73,875	46.5
Libertarian	Bob New	4,489	2.8
Total votes		159,066	100.0
Republican hold			

=== 2000 ===
2000 United States House of Representatives elections in California
Party	Candidate	Votes	%
Democratic	Adam Schiff	113,708	52.7
Republican	Jim Rogan (Incumbent)	94,518	43.9
Natural Law	Miriam R. Hospodar	3,873	1.7
Libertarian	Ted Brown	3,675	1.7
Total votes		215,774	100.0
Democratic gain from Republican			

=== 2002 ===
2002 United States House of Representatives elections in California
Party	Candidate	Votes	%
Democratic	Brad Sherman (Incumbent)	79,815	62.0
Republican	Robert M. Levy	48,996	38.0
Total votes		128,811	100.0
Democratic hold			

=== 2004 ===
2004 United States House of Representatives elections in California
Party	Candidate	Votes	%
Democratic	Brad Sherman (Incumbent)	125,296	62.3
Republican	Robert M. Levy	66,946	33.3
Green	Eric J. Carter	8,956	4.4
Total votes		201,198	100.0
Democratic hold			

=== 2006 ===
2006 United States House of Representatives elections in California
Party	Candidate	Votes	%
Democratic	Brad Sherman (Incumbent)	92,650	68.8
Republican	Peter Hankwitz	42,074	31.2
Total votes		134,724	100.0
Democratic hold			

=== 2008 ===
2008 United States House of Representatives elections in California
Party	Candidate	Votes	%
Democratic	Brad Sherman (Incumbent)	135,665	68.6
Republican	Navraj Singh	49,510	24.8
Libertarian	Tim Denton	14,171	6.6
Total votes		185,175	100.0
Democratic hold			

=== 2010 ===
2010 United States House of Representatives elections in California
Party	Candidate	Votes	%
Democratic	Brad Sherman (Incumbent)	102,927	65.1
Republican	Mark Reed	55,056	34.9
Total votes		157,983	100.0
Democratic hold			

=== 2012 ===
2012 United States House of Representatives elections in California
Party	Candidate	Votes	%
Democratic	Judy Chu (Incumbent)	154,191	64.0
Republican	Jack Orswell	86,817	36.0
Total votes		241,008	100.0
Democratic hold			

=== 2014 ===
2014 United States House of Representatives elections in California
Party	Candidate	Votes	%
Democratic	Judy Chu (Incumbent)	75,728	59.4
Republican	Jack Orswell	51,852	40.6
Total votes		127,580	100.0
Democratic hold			

=== 2016 ===
2016 United States House of Representatives elections in California
Party	Candidate	Votes	%
Democratic	Judy Chu (Incumbent)	168,977	67.4
Republican	Jack Orswell	81,655	32.6
Total votes		250,632	100.0
Democratic hold			

=== 2018 ===
2018 United States House of Representatives elections in California
Party	Candidate	Votes	%
Democratic	Judy Chu (Incumbent)	160,504	79.2
Democratic	Bryan Witt	42,132	20.8
Total votes		202,636	100.0
Democratic hold			

=== 2020 ===
2020 United States House of Representatives elections in California
Party	Candidate	Votes	%
Democratic	Judy Chu (Incumbent)	221,411	69.8
Republican	Johnny J. Nalbandian	95,907	30.2
Total votes		317,318	100.0
Democratic hold			

=== 2022 ===
2022 United States House of Representatives elections in California
Party	Candidate	Votes	%
Republican	Mike Garcia (Incumbent)	104,624	53.2
Democratic	Christy Smith	91,892	46.8
Total votes		196,516	100.0
Republican hold			

=== 2024 ===
2024 United States House of Representatives elections in California
Party	Candidate	Votes	%
Democratic	George Whitesides	154,040	51.3
Republican	Mike Garcia (Incumbent)	146,050	48.7
Total votes		300,090	100.0
Democratic gain from Republican			

== See also ==
- List of United States congressional districts
- California's congressional districts
