= James E. Rogan =

American politician (born 1957)

Jim Rogan
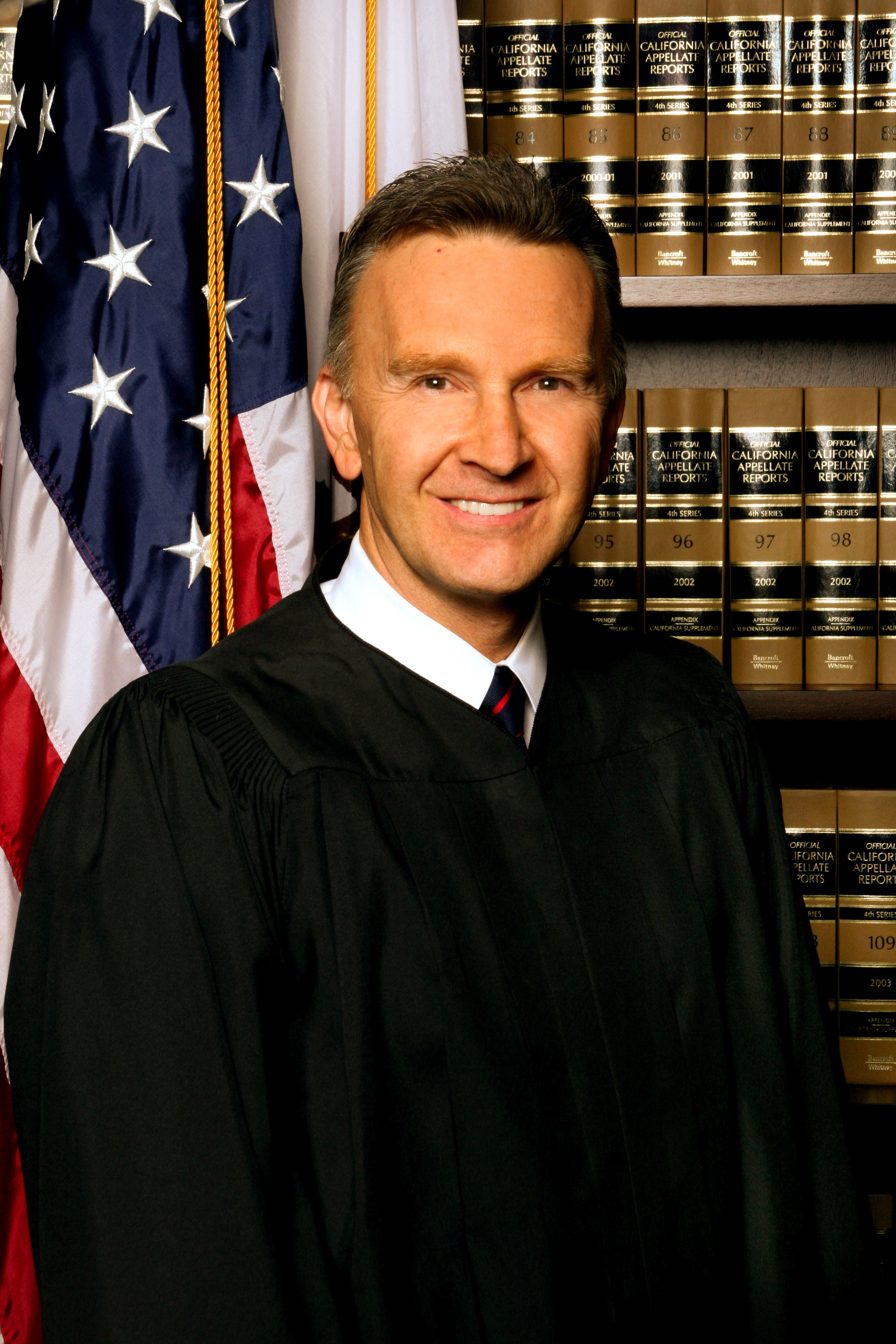
- Rogan in 2007

Judge of the Orange County Superior Court
- In office October 3, 2006 – November 5, 2023
- Appointed by: Arnold Schwarzenegger
- Preceded by: Susanne Shaw
- Succeeded by: Julianne Bancroft

Under Secretary of Commerce for Intellectual Property Director of the United States Patent and Trademark Office
- In office December 10, 2001 – January 9, 2004
- President: George W. Bush
- Preceded by: Q. Todd Dickinson
- Succeeded by: Jon Dudas

Member of the U.S. House of Representatives from California's 27th district
- In office January 3, 1997 – January 3, 2001
- Preceded by: Carlos Moorhead
- Succeeded by: Adam Schiff

Majority Leader of the California Assembly
- In office January 16, 1996 – November 30, 1996
- Preceded by: Curt Pringle
- Succeeded by: Antonio Villaraigosa

Member of the California State Assembly from the 43rd district
- In office May 9, 1994 – November 30, 1996
- Preceded by: Pat Nolan
- Succeeded by: Scott Wildman

Personal details
- Born: James Edward Rogan; August 21, 1957 (age 68) San Francisco, California, U.S.
- Party: Republican
- Spouse: Christine Apffel (m. 1988)
- Children: 2
- Education: Las Positas College; University of California, Berkeley (BA); University of California, Los Angeles (JD)

James Edward Rogan (born August 21, 1957) is an American adjunct law professor and author who served as a judge of the Orange County Superior Court from 2006 to 2023. A member of the Republican Party, he served as a member of the U.S. House of Representatives from 1997 to 2001. He also served as a member of the California State Assembly from 1994 to 1996.

== Early life and education ==
Rogan was expelled from high school in the tenth grade. Although he never completed high school formally, Rogan attended Chabot Community College—now Las Positas Community College—in Livermore. He went on to earn a bachelor's degree in political science from the University of California at Berkeley, and later his Juris Doctor degree from UCLA Law School, where he was a member of the UCLA Law Review. Rogan helped pay his way through law school by working as a bartender and bouncer at several Hollywood night clubs.

== Early professional career ==
Rogan did a short stint (1983–1985) as a civil litigation attorney in one of Los Angeles' oldest law firms (Lillick McHose & Charles). He resigned from his firm and signed on as a Los Angeles County Deputy District Attorney, where he later was recruited to the "Hardcore Gang Murder Unit". He prosecuted some of Los Angeles' most notorious street gangs. In a 1990 statewide poll of prosecutors, defense attorneys and judges, California Lawyer Magazine named Rogan as one of the state's most effective prosecutors.

Later that year Governor George Deukmejian appointed the 33-year-old prosecutor to be a judge of the Glendale Municipal Court. Rogan was California's youngest sitting state court judge at the time of his elevation to the bench. During his service on the municipal court (1990–1994) Rogan presided over thousands of civil and criminal cases. In 1993 his colleagues elected him presiding judge of their local court. He began teaching as an adjunct professor of law in 1987; over the next two decades he taught at various law schools in Southern California, and continues teaching to date. He has been an adjunct professor of criminal law, criminal procedure, trial practice and trial advocacy. He has lectured in many other areas of law, including evidence and intellectual property.

=== California State Assembly ===
In 1994 Rogan ran for and won a special election to the California State Assembly after the previous incumbent, former GOP minority leader Pat Nolan resigned after he was convicted of charges of accepting illegal campaign contributions as a result of an FBI sting operation. Nolan was later pardoned by President Donald Trump. In Rogan's freshman term his colleagues elected him Majority Leader. California Journal Magazine named him the Assembly's most effective legislator, and ranked him No. 1 in integrity and No. 1 in effectiveness. He served on the Assembly's Appropriations, Budget, Public Safety, Natural Resources, and Education Committees.

=== United States Congress ===
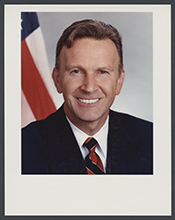
Rogan served in the United States House of Representatives representing California's 27th district from 1997 to 2001.

In 1996, Rogan won the first of two terms to the United States House of Representatives. Elected with just 50.1%, Rogan became one of only two House members to serve on both the House Commerce Committee and the House Judiciary Committee. On the House Judiciary Committee, Rogan and his colleagues were responsible for reviewing all proposed legislation dealing with a variety of complex issues, including all intellectual property issues (copyrights, patents and trademarks); protection of trade and commerce against unlawful restraint of trade and monopolies; the judiciary and all judicial proceedings (civil and criminal); administrative proceedings; immigration issues; bankruptcy law, and all proposed constitutional amendments.

As a member of the House Judiciary Committee's Subcommittee on Immigration, Rogan served on legislation related to U.S immigration policy, including measures affecting H-1B visa. Rogan also served on the House Commerce Committee, where he was a member of the Telecommunications, Trade and consumer protection Subcommittee and Power Subcommittee. These subcommittees had jurisdiction over telecommunications, interstate and foreign commerce, consumer protection, trade, energy policy, utility regulation, and oversight of nuclear facilities.

During his congressional service, Rogan was Assistant Majority Whip for the House Republican Conference, helping mobilize House votes on key legislative objectives, provided legislative information to Members and the House leadership, and helped to coordinate legislative and political strategies within the Congress. He also was a member of both Speaker Gingrich and Majority Leader Dick Armey's "Kitchen Cabinet" advisory groups. He met regularly with the Speaker and the Majority Leader to discuss political and legislative strategies and tactics during the congressional session. Speaker Gingrich named Rogan as co-chairman of the Speaker's High Tech Task Force, and named Rogan Speaker Pro Tempore on numerous occasions.

=== The impeachment trial of President Bill Clinton ===
Because of his background as a prosecutor and his reputation for respect among Republicans and Democrats, Rogan was selected to be one of the thirteen house managers in the impeachment trial of President Clinton. Although Rogan and his predecessor in the 27th District were both Republican, the district had been trending Democratic for some time, and many of the district's constituents opposed the impeachment. In 2000, Democrats made defeating Rogan a high priority in the U.S. House races, and he was defeated by then state senator Adam Schiff in the most expensive House race in history at the time.

=== Post-congressional career ===
Shortly after Rogan left Congress, President George W. Bush selected him to be the U.S. Under Secretary of Commerce for Intellectual Property and director of the U.S. Patent and Trademark Office. Although controlled by a Democratic majority, the U.S. Senate confirmed Rogan unanimously, and he assumed office in December 2001. In this new role, Rogan ran one of the oldest agencies in the federal government, overseeing 8,000 employees and a $1.5 billion budget. He served as chief advisor to the president on all matters of intellectual property and authored the USPTO's 21st Century Strategic Plan, a reorganization of the 214-year-old agency to modernize and integrate its operations with the leading world intellectual property offices.

Rogan left the Bush administration in early 2004, and joined the law firm of Venable LLP, where he worked as a partner in their Southern California and Washington, D.C., offices. Later, he joined Preston Gates & Ellis LLP, working out of their California and D.C. offices.

In January 2007, President George W. Bush nominated Rogan for a federal judgeship for the United States District Court for the Central District of California. His nomination received broad bipartisan support, including the unanimous approval of Democratic U.S. Senator Dianne Feinstein's judicial nominee review committee, along with the highest rating from the American Bar Association. Despite this, the Democratic-controlled United States Senate Judiciary Committee declined to give Rogan's nomination a hearing because U.S. Senator Barbara Boxer put a hold on the nomination, citing Rogan's role in Clinton's impeachment as the reason. His nomination died at the end of the 109th Congress in January 2009 because the Senate failed to act on it.

=== Superior Court of California ===
In July 2006, California governor Arnold Schwarzenegger appointed Rogan to serve as a judge on the Superior Court of California in Orange County; Rogan took office in October 2006. He won election to a full term without opposition in 2008, and again in 2014 and 2020. He retired from the bench in late 2023. Since the mid-1980s he has served as an adjunct professor of law at various law schools in Southern California, where he has taught criminal law, criminal procedure, evidence, and trial advocacy.

== Personal life ==
Rogan planned on marrying his longtime girlfriend, Terri Lemke, but the relationship did not survive his move to Los Angeles to attend law school. He married Christine Apffel in 1988; they have twin daughters.

== Bibliography ==
Rogan has authored four non-fiction books, and one work of historical fiction:

- Rough Edges: My Unlikely Road from Welfare to Washington, HarperCollins, 2004
- Catching Our Flag: Behind the Scenes of a Presidential Impeachment, WND Books, 2011
- And Then I Met...Stories of Growing Up, Meeting Famous People, and Annoying the Hell Out of Them, WND Books, 2014
- On to Chicago: Rediscovering Robert F. Kennedy and the Lost Campaign of 1968, WND Books, 2018
- Shaking Hands with History: My Encounters with the Famous, the Infamous, and the Once-Famous But Now-Forgotten, Shenandoah Books, 2020

California Assembly
Preceded by Curt Pringle	Majority Leader of the California Assembly; 1996	Succeeded by Antonio Villaraigosa
U.S. House of Representatives
Preceded by Carlos Moorhead	Member of the U.S. House of Representatives from California's 27th congressional district 1997–2001	Succeeded by Adam Schiff
Political offices
Preceded by Q. Todd Dickinson	Under Secretary of Commerce for Intellectual Property; Director of the United States Patent and Trademark Office; 2001–2004	Succeeded by Jon Dudas
U.S. order of precedence (ceremonial)
Preceded by William P. Baker as Former U.S. Representative	Order of precedence of the United States as Former U.S. Representative	Succeeded by Janice Hahn as Former U.S. Representative
