= Golden Hills, California =

Golden Hills
- census-designated place
- Location in Kern County and the state of California

- Location in the United States
- Coordinates: 35°08′33″N 118°29′25″W
- Country: United States
- State: California
- County: Kern

Government
  - Assemblymember: Stan Ellis (R)
  - State Senator: Shannon Grove (R)
  - U. S. Congress: Vince Fong (R)

Area
  - Total: 10.931 sq mi (28.312 km^{2})
  - Land: 10.914 sq mi (28.267 km^{2})
  - Water: 0.017 sq mi (0.045 km^{2}) 0.16%
- Elevation: 3,917 ft (1,194 m)

Population (2020)
  - Total: 9,578
  - Density: 877.6/sq mi (338.8/km^{2})
- Time zone: UTC-8 (PST)
  - Summer (DST): UTC-7 (PDT)
- ZIP code: 93561
- Area code: 661
- FIPS code: 06-30282
- GNIS feature ID: 1867025

Golden Hills is a census-designated place (CDP) in the Tehachapi Mountains, in Kern County, California, United States. The population was 9,578 at the 2020 census, up from 8,656 at the 2010 census. Golden Hills adjoins the city of Tehachapi on the west.

== Geography ==
Golden Hills is located at 35°08′33″N 118°29′25″W.

According to the United States Census Bureau, the CDP has a total area of 10.9 square miles (28 km^{2}), of which 0.017 square miles (0.044 km^{2}) or 0.16% is water.

== Demographics ==
Historical population
Census	Pop.	Note	%±
1990	5,423		—
2000	7,434		37.1%
2010	8,656		16.4%
2020	9,578		10.7%
U.S. Decennial Census; 1860–1870 1880-1890; 1900 1910 1920; 1930 1940 1950; 1960 1970 1980; 1990 2000 2010; 2020

Golden Hills first appeared as a census designated place in the 1990 U.S. census.

=== Racial and ethnic composition ===
Golden Hills CDP, California – Racial and ethnic composition Note: the US Census treats Hispanic/Latino as an ethnic category. This table excludes Latinos from the racial categories and assigns them to a separate category. Hispanics/Latinos may be of any race.
Race / Ethnicity (NH = Non-Hispanic)	Pop 2000	Pop 2010	Pop 2020	% 2000	% 2010	% 2020
White alone (NH)	5,668	6,387	6,274	76.24%	73.79%	65.50%
Black or African American alone (NH)	92	118	130	1.24%	1.36%	1.36%
Native American or Alaska Native alone (NH)	39	78	79	0.52%	0.90%	0.82%
Asian alone (NH)	83	114	129	1.12%	1.32%	1.35%
Native Hawaiian or Pacific Islander alone (NH)	6	11	11	0.08%	0.13%	0.11%
Other race alone (NH)	32	20	77	0.43%	0.23%	0.80%
Mixed race or Multiracial (NH)	286	254	546	3.85%	2.93%	5.70%
Hispanic or Latino (any race)	1,228	1,674	2,332	16.52%	19.34%	24.35%
Total	7,434	8,656	9,578	100.00%	100.00%	100.00%

=== 2020 census ===
As of the 2020 census, Golden Hills had a population of 9,578. The population density was 877.6 inhabitants per square mile (338.8/km^{2}). The racial makeup was 72.3% White, 1.5% African American, 1.6% Native American, 1.5% Asian, 0.3% Pacific Islander, 9.0% from other races, and 13.9% from two or more races. Hispanic or Latino residents of any race were 24.3% of the population.

The census reported that 99.9% of the population lived in households, 12 people (0.1%) lived in non-institutionalized group quarters, and no one was institutionalized. In addition, 84.2% of residents lived in urban areas and 15.8% lived in rural areas.

There were 3,628 households, of which 32.3% had children under the age of 18 living in them. Of all households, 54.0% were married-couple households, 6.5% were cohabiting couple households, 22.6% had a female householder with no spouse or partner present, and 17.0% had a male householder with no spouse or partner present. About 24.0% of households were made up of individuals, and 10.2% had someone living alone who was 65 years of age or older. The average household size was 2.64, and there were 2,577 families (71.0% of all households).

The age distribution was 24.8% under the age of 18, 7.1% aged 18 to 24, 25.2% aged 25 to 44, 24.5% aged 45 to 64, and 18.5% aged 65 or older. The median age was 38.8 years. For every 100 females, there were 99.7 males, and for every 100 females age 18 and over there were 98.0 males age 18 and over.

There were 3,838 housing units at an average density of 351.7 units per square mile (135.8 units/km^{2}), of which 3,628 (94.5%) were occupied. Of occupied units, 71.5% were owner-occupied and 28.5% were occupied by renters. 5.5% of housing units were vacant; the homeowner vacancy rate was 1.4%, and the rental vacancy rate was 5.1%.

=== Demographic estimates ===
In 2023, the US Census Bureau estimated that 6.8% of the population were foreign-born. Of all people aged 5 or older, 81.7% spoke only English at home, 16.5% spoke Spanish, 0.6% spoke other Indo-European languages, 1.1% spoke Asian or Pacific Islander languages, and 0.1% spoke other languages. Of those aged 25 or older, 91.9% were high school graduates and 27.5% had a bachelor's degree.

=== Income and poverty ===
The median household income was $94,654, and the per capita income was $43,710. About 9.6% of families and 12.0% of the population were below the poverty line.

=== 2010 census ===
At the 2010 census Golden Hills had a population of 8,656. The population density was 705.7 inhabitants per square mile (272.5/km^{2}). The racial makeup of Golden Hills was 7,235 (83.6%) White, 129 (1.5%) African American, 124 (1.4%) Native American, 120 (1.4%) Asian, 15 (0.2%) Pacific Islander, 670 (7.7%) from other races, and 363 (4.2%) from two or more races. Hispanic or Latino of any race were 1,674 persons (19.3%).

The whole population lived in households, no one lived in non-institutionalized group quarters and no one was institutionalized.

There were 3,216 households, 1,173 (36.5%) had children under the age of 18 living in them, 1,887 (58.7%) were opposite-sex married couples living together, 339 (10.5%) had a female householder with no husband present, 144 (4.5%) had a male householder with no wife present. There were 188 (5.8%) unmarried opposite-sex partnerships, and 15 (0.5%) same-sex married couples or partnerships. 672 households (20.9%) were one person and 247 (7.7%) had someone living alone who was 65 or older. The average household size was 2.69. There were 2,370 families (73.7% of households); the average family size was 3.11.

The age distribution was 2,245 people (25.9%) under the age of 18, 819 people (9.5%) aged 18 to 24, 1,872 people (21.6%) aged 25 to 44, 2,648 people (30.6%) aged 45 to 64, and 1,072 people (12.4%) who were 65 or older. The median age was 38.6 years. For every 100 females, there were 99.9 males. For every 100 females age 18 and over, there were 98.4 males.

There were 3,522 housing units at an average density of 287.1 per square mile, of the occupied units 2,204 (68.5%) were owner-occupied and 1,012 (31.5%) were rented. The homeowner vacancy rate was 2.3%; the rental vacancy rate was 9.5%. 5,836 people (67.4% of the population) lived in owner-occupied housing units and 2,820 people (32.6%) lived in rental housing units.
