= California's 43rd State Assembly district =

American legislative district

Current assemblymember
Celeste Rodriguez; D–San Fernando
- Population (2010) • Voting age • Citizen voting age: 468,406; 381,417; 295,412
- Demographics: 55.92% White; 2.22% Black; 23.32% Latino; 17.24% Asian; 0.32% Native American; 0.24% Hawaiian/Pacific Islander; 0.33% other; 0.42% remainder of multiracial
- Registered voters: 281,486
- Registration: 46.87% Democratic; 20.68% Republican; 27.80% No party preference

California's 43rd State Assembly district is one of 80 California State Assembly districts. It is currently represented by Democrat Celeste Rodriguez.

== District profile ==
The district encompasses the eastern end of the San Fernando Valley, with portions jutting southward into Central Los Angeles.

Los Angeles County – 4.8%

- Los Angeles – 3.5%
  - Hollywood Hills – partial
  - North Hollywood – partial
  - Panorama City
  - Sun Valley
  - Sylmar
  - Van Nuys
- San Fernando

== Election results from statewide races ==
Year	Office	Results
2020	President	Biden 66.7 - 29.6%
2018	Governor	Newsom 72.1 – 27.9%
2018	Senator	Feinstein 58.4 – 41.6%
2016	President	Clinton 68.9 – 25.5%
2016	Senator	Harris 63.5 – 36.5%
2014	Governor	Brown 68.3 – 31.7%
2012	President	Obama 67.3 – 29.6%
2012	Senator	Feinstein 70.5 – 29.5%

== List of assembly members representing district ==
Due to redistricting, the 43rd district has been moved around different parts of the state. The current iteration resulted from the 2021 redistricting by the California Citizens Redistricting Commission.

Member	Party	Years served	Electoral history	Counties represented
Eugene F. Loud (San Francisco)	Republican	January 5, 1885 – January 3, 1887	Elected in 1884. [data missing]	San Francisco
Luther L. Ewing (San Francisco)	Republican	January 3, 1887 – January 5, 1891	Elected in 1886. Re-elected in 1888. [data missing]	San Francisco
William E. Tennis (San Francisco)	Republican	January 5, 1891 – January 2, 1893	Elected in 1890. [data missing]	San Francisco
J. M. Marks (San Francisco)	Democratic	January 2, 1893 – January 7, 1895	Elected in 1892. [data missing]	San Francisco
William T. Boothby (San Francisco)	Republican	January 7, 1895 – January 4, 1897	Elected in 1894. [data missing]	San Francisco
Leon Dennery (San Francisco)	Republican	January 4, 1897 – January 2, 1899	Elected in 1896. [data missing]	San Francisco
Fred Lundquist (San Francisco)	Republican	January 2, 1899 – January 1, 1901	Elected in 1898. [data missing]	San Francisco
Martin W. Brady (San Francisco)	Republican	January 1, 1901 – January 5, 1903	Elected in 1900. [data missing]	San Francisco
William H. R. McMartin (Santa Clara)	Republican	January 5, 1903 – January 2, 1905	Elected in 1902. [data missing]	San Francisco
Marc Anthony (San Francisco)	Republican	January 2, 1905 – January 7, 1907	Elected in 1904. Retired to run for California State Senate.	San Francisco
Dominic J. Beban (San Francisco)	Republican	January 7, 1907 – January 2, 1911	Elected in 1906. Elected in 1908. Retired to run for California State Senate.	San Francisco
Frank N. Rodgers (San Francisco)	Republican	January 2, 1911 – January 6, 1913	Elected in 1910. [data missing]	San Francisco
David D. Bowman (San Rafael)	Republican	January 6, 1913 – January 4, 1915	Elected in 1912. [data missing]	Santa Cruz
Harold E. McPherson (Santa Cruz)	Republican	January 4, 1915 – May 12, 1916	Elected in 1914. Died.	Santa Cruz
Vacant		May 12, 1916 – January 8, 1917		Santa Cruz
R. H. Hudson (Watsonville)	Republican	January 8, 1917 – January 6, 1919	Elected in 1916. [data missing]	Santa Cruz
Champ S. Price (Santa Cruz)	Republican	January 6, 1919 – January 3, 1921	Elected in 1918. [data missing]	Santa Cruz
George C. Cleveland (Watsonville)	Republican	January 3, 1921 – January 3, 1927	Elected in 1920. Re-elected in 1922. Re-elected in 1924. [data missing]	Santa Cruz
Bert B. Snyder (Chico)	Republican	January 3, 1927 – January 5, 1931	Elected in 1926. Re-elected in 1928. Retired to run for California State Senate.	Santa Cruz
Chris N. Jespersen (Atascadero)	Republican	January 5, 1931 – January 2, 1933	Redistricted from the 53rd district and re-elected in 1930. Retired to run for California State Senate.	Monterey, San Luis Obispo
C. Don Field (Glendale)	Republican	January 2, 1933 – January 3, 1949	Elected in 1932. Re-elected in 1934. Re-elected in 1936. Re-elected in 1938. Re-elected in 1940. Re-elected in 1942. Re-elected in 1944. Re-elected in 1946. Retired.	Los Angeles
H. Allen Smith (Glendale)	Republican	January 3, 1949 – January 3, 1957	Elected in 1948. Re-elected in 1950. Re-elected in 1952. Re-elected in 1954. Retired to run for U.S. House of Representatives.	Los Angeles
Howard J. Thelin (Glendale)	Republican	January 7, 1957 – December 28, 1966	Elected in 1956. Re-elected in 1958. Re-elected in 1960. Re-elected in 1962. Re-elected in 1964. Resigned.	Los Angeles
Vacant		December 28, 1966 – January 7, 1967		Los Angeles
Carlos Moorhead (Glendale)	Republican	January 7, 1967 – January 3, 1973	Elected in 1966. Re-elected in 1968. Re-elected in 1970. Retired to run for U.S. House of Representatives.	Los Angeles
Michael D. Antonovich (Los Angeles)	Republican	January 8, 1973 – November 30, 1974	Elected in 1972. Redistricted to the 41st district.	Los Angeles
Howard Berman (Los Angeles)	Democratic	December 2, 1974 – November 30, 1982	Redistricted from the 57th district and re-elected in 1974. Re-elected in 1976. Re-elected in 1978. Re-elected in 1980. Retired to run for U.S. House of Representatives.	Los Angeles
Gray Davis (Los Angeles)	Democratic	December 6, 1982 – November 30, 1986	Elected in 1982. Re-elected in 1984. Retired to run for California State Controller.	Los Angeles
Terry B. Friedman (Los Angeles)	Democratic	December 1, 1986 – November 30, 1992	Elected in 1986. Re-elected in 1988. Re-elected in 1990. Redistricted to the 41st district.	Los Angeles
Pat Nolan (Los Angeles)	Republican	December 7, 1992 – February 18, 1994	Redistricted from the 41st district and re-elected in 1992. Resigned after being indicted due to the BRISPEC sting operation.	Los Angeles
Vacant		February 18, 1994 – May 9, 1994		Los Angeles
James E. Rogan (Glendale)	Republican	May 9, 1994 – November 30, 1996	Elected to finish Nolan's term. Re-elected in 1994. Retired to run for U.S. House of Representatives.	Los Angeles
Scott Wildman (Los Angeles)	Democratic	December 2, 1996 – November 30, 2000	Elected in 1996. Re-elected in 1998. Retired to run for California State Senate.	Los Angeles
Dario Frommer (Los Angeles)	Democratic	December 4, 2000 – November 30, 2006	Elected in 2000. Re-elected in 2002. Re-elected in 2004. Term-limited and retired.	Los Angeles
Paul Krekorian (Los Angeles)	Democratic	December 4, 2006 – January 5, 2010	Elected in 2006. Re-elected in 2008. Resigned after election to the Los Angeles City Council.	Los Angeles
Vacant		January 5, 2010 – June 10, 2010		Los Angeles
Mike Gatto (Los Angeles)	Democratic	June 10, 2010 – November 30, 2016	Elected to finish Krekorian's term. Re-elected in 2010. Re-elected in 2012. Re-elected in 2014. Retired to run for California State Senate.	Los Angeles
Laura Friedman (Glendale)	Democratic	December 5, 2016 – November 30, 2022	Elected in 2016. Re-elected in 2018. Re-elected in 2020. Redistricted to the 44th district.	Los Angeles
Luz Rivas (Los Angeles)	Democratic	December 5, 2022 – November 30, 2024	Redistricted from the 39th district and re-elected in 2022. Retired to run for the U.S. House of Representatives.	Los Angeles
Celeste Rodriguez (San Fernando)	Democratic	December 2, 2024 – present	Elected in 2024.	Los Angeles

== Election results (1990–present) ==
=== 2024 ===
2024 California State Assembly 43rd district election
Primary election
Party	Candidate	Votes	%
Democratic	Celeste Rodriguez	20,485	43.5
Republican	Victoria Garcia	11,077	23.5
Democratic	Walter Garcia	8,070	17.1
Republican	Felicia Novick	3,431	7.3
No party preference	Carmelina Minasova	2,045	4.3
Democratic	Saul Hurtado	2,024	4.3
Total votes		47,132	100.0
General election
Democratic	Celeste Rodriguez	85,983	66.6
Republican	Victoria Garcia	43,028	33.4
Total votes		129,011	100.0
Democratic hold			

=== 2022 ===
2022 California State Assembly 43rd district election
Primary election
Party	Candidate	Votes	%
Democratic	Luz Rivas (incumbent)	38,303	98.5
Republican	Siaka Massaquoi (write-in)	575	1.5
Total votes		38,878	100.0
General election
Democratic	Luz Rivas (incumbent)	55,282	74.6
Republican	Siaka Massaquoi	18,782	25.4
Total votes		74,064	100.0
Democratic hold			

=== 2020 ===
2020 California State Assembly 43rd district election
Primary election
Party	Candidate	Votes	%
Democratic	Laura Friedman (incumbent)	88,541	75.6
Republican	Mike Graves	24,258	20.7
Independent	Robert J. Sexton	4,264	3.6
Total votes		117,063	100.0
General election
Democratic	Laura Friedman (incumbent)	149,214	69.6
Republican	Mike Graves	65,270	30.4
Total votes		214,484	100.0
Democratic hold			

=== 2018 ===
2018 California State Assembly 43rd district election
Primary election
Party	Candidate	Votes	%
Democratic	Laura Friedman (incumbent)	58,310	100.0
Total votes		58,310	100.0
General election
Democratic	Laura Friedman (incumbent)	125,568	100.0
Total votes		125,568	100.0
Democratic hold			

=== 2016 ===
2016 California State Assembly 43rd district election
Primary election
Party	Candidate	Votes	%
Democratic	Laura Friedman	33,276	31.9
Democratic	Ardy Kassakhian	25,357	24.3
Republican	Mark MacCarley	16,551	15.9
Democratic	Andrew J. Blumenfield	13,309	12.8
Republican	Alexandra A. Bustamante	6,524	6.3
Democratic	Dennis R. Bullock	4,294	4.1
Democratic	Rajiv Dalal	3,173	3.0
American Independent	Aaron Cervantes	1,873	1.8
Total votes		104,357	100.0
General election
Democratic	Laura Friedman	106,186	64.5
Democratic	Ardy Kassakhian	58,561	35.5
Total votes		164,747	100.0
Democratic hold			

=== 2014 ===
2014 California State Assembly 43rd district election
Primary election
Party	Candidate	Votes	%
Democratic	Mike Gatto (incumbent)	28,354	67.0
Republican	Todd Royal	13,985	33.0
Total votes		42,339	100.0
General election
Democratic	Mike Gatto (incumbent)	51,971	66.5
Republican	Todd Royal	26,192	33.5
Total votes		78,163	100.0
Democratic hold			

=== 2012 ===
2012 California State Assembly 43rd district election
Primary election
Party	Candidate	Votes	%
Democratic	Mike Gatto (incumbent)	26,397	55.7
Republican	Greg Krikorian	21,025	44.3
Total votes		47,422	100.0
General election
Democratic	Mike Gatto (incumbent)	95,673	60.2
Republican	Greg Krikorian	63,251	39.8
Total votes		158,924	100.0
Democratic hold			

=== 2010 ===
2010 California State Assembly 43rd district election
Party	Candidate	Votes	%
Democratic	Mike Gatto (incumbent)	65,350	66.0
Republican	Sunder Ramani	33,767	34.0
Total votes		99,117	100.0
Democratic hold			

=== 2010 (special) ===
2010 California State Assembly 43rd district special election Vacancy resulting from the resignation of Paul Krekorian
Party	Candidate	Votes	%
Democratic	Mike Gatto	23,733	58.6
Republican	Sunder Ramani	16,778	41.4
Total votes		40,511	100.0
Democratic hold			

=== 2008 ===
2008 California State Assembly 43rd district election
Party	Candidate	Votes	%
Democratic	Paul Krekorian (incumbent)	91,863	67.9
Republican	Jane Barnett	43,492	32.1
Total votes		135,355	100.0
Democratic hold			

=== 2006 ===
2006 California State Assembly 43rd district election
Party	Candidate	Votes	%
Democratic	Paul Krekorian	55,871	63.2
Republican	Michael M. Agbaba	26,350	29.7
Libertarian	Steve Myers	6,296	7.1
Total votes		88,517	100.0
Democratic hold			

=== 2004 ===
2004 California State Assembly 43rd district election
Party	Candidate	Votes	%
Democratic	Dario Frommer (incumbent)	94,149	76.6
Libertarian	Sandor J. Woren	28,805	23.4
Total votes		122,954	100.0
Democratic hold			

=== 2002 ===
2002 California State Assembly 43rd district election
Party	Candidate	Votes	%
Democratic	Dario Frommer (incumbent)	46,458	61.0
Republican	Ingrid Geyer	26,590	34.8
Libertarian	Sandor J. Woren	3,209	4.2
Total votes		76,257	100.0
Democratic hold			

=== 2000 ===
2000 California State Assembly 43rd district election
Party	Candidate	Votes	%
Democratic	Dario Frommer	70,841	58.7
Republican	Craig Harry Missakian	49,786	41.3
Total votes		120,627	100.0
Democratic hold			

=== 1998 ===
1998 California State Assembly 43rd district election
Party	Candidate	Votes	%
Democratic	Scott Wildman (incumbent)	55,256	65.0
Republican	Peter R. Repovich	26,749	31.5
Libertarian	Daniel White	1,793	2.1
Reform	Marie Buren	1,160	1.4
Total votes		84,958	100.0
Democratic hold			

=== 1996 ===
1996 California State Assembly 43rd district election
Party	Candidate	Votes	%
Democratic	Scott Wildman	49,452	48.4
Republican	John Geranios	49,260	48.2
Libertarian	Willard Michlin	3,562	3.5
Total votes		102,274	100.0
Democratic gain from Republican			

=== 1994 ===
1994 California State Assembly 43rd district election
Party	Candidate	Votes	%
Republican	James E. Rogan (incumbent)	47,895	53.7
Democratic	Adam Schiff	38,319	43.0
Libertarian	Willard Michlin	2,935	3.3
Total votes		89,149	100.0
Republican hold			

=== 1994 (special) ===
1994 California State Assembly 43rd district special election Vacancy resulting from the resignation of Pat Nolan
Party	Candidate	Votes	%
Republican	James E. Rogan	12,663	52.9
Democratic	Adam Schiff	6,165	25.7
Republican	Julia L. Woo	2,607	10.9
Republican	David E. Wallis	1,007	4.2
Democratic	Ken Kulpa	628	2.6
Libertarian	Willard Del Michlin	505	2.1
Republican	Joseph Paul Piertoforte	368	1.5
Total votes		23,943	100.0
Republican hold			

=== 1992 ===
1992 California State Assembly 43rd district election
Party	Candidate	Votes	%
Republican	Pat Nolan (incumbent)	64,489	56.2
Democratic	Elliott Graham	42,962	37.4
Libertarian	Anthony G. Bajada	7,293	6.4
Total votes		114,744	100.0
Republican gain from Democratic			

=== 1990 ===
1990 California State Assembly 43rd district election
Party	Candidate	Votes	%
Democratic	Terry B. Friedman (incumbent)	61,769	60.5
Republican	Gary Passi	33,377	32.7
Peace and Freedom	John Paul Lindblad	4,324	4.2
Libertarian	Andrew S. Rotter	2,694	2.6
Total votes		102,164	100.0
Democratic hold			

== See also ==
- California State Assembly
- California State Assembly districts
- Districts in California
