= William H. R. McMartin =

American politician

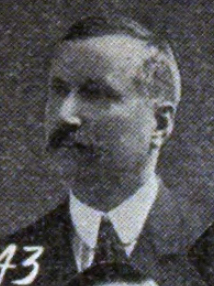

Member of the California State Assembly from the 43rd district
- In office January 5, 1903 - January 2, 1905
- Preceded by: Martin W. Brady
- Succeeded by: Marc Anthony

Personal details
- Born: June 10, 1854 Ormstown, Canada East
- Died: April 23, 1945 (aged 90) Santa Clara, California
- Party: Republican
- Spouse: Mary Effie Hitchcock (m. 1878; died 1941)
- Children: 3

William H. R. McMartin (June 10, 1854 – April 23, 1945) was an American politician who served in the California State Assembly for the 43rd district from 1903 to 1905.
