= Scott Wildman =

American politician

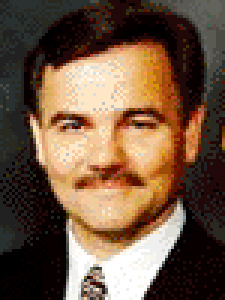
- Official portrait, 1999

Member of the California State Assembly from the 43rd district
- In office December 2, 1996 – November 30, 2000
- Preceded by: James E. Rogan
- Succeeded by: Dario Frommer

Personal details
- Born: April 12, 1951 (age 75) San Diego, California
- Party: Democratic
- Spouse: Arlene Irlando
- Children: 5

Scott Frederic Wildman (born April 12, 1951) is an American teacher, labor organizer and politician. He is a member of the Democratic Party.

== Career ==
In 1996, he ran for the Glendale-Burbank based 43rd district in the California State Assembly left open when incumbent Republican James Rogan decided to run for congress. Wildman was an underdog, but demographic changes plus coordination with other Democratic campaigns in the area allowed him to eke out a 192-vote win over wealthy GOP businessman John Geranios. The race was so close that Wildman was not officially declared the winner until November 23, 1996.

In 1998, Wildman sought reelection and was a top Republican target. An aggressive district outreach operation garnered Wildman strong support from Armenian and Latino voters, as well as endorsements from local Republican and Democratic officials, labor, teachers and law enforcement for his re-election effort. He also lucked out when his GOP opponent turned out to have too many skeletons in his closet. As a result, Republicans did not mount much of a challenge, and Wildman scored an easy win.

In 2000, he did not seek reelection and instead opted to run for an open state senate seat. He faced off against fellow assemblyman Jack Scott from neighboring Pasadena in the Democratic primary. Wildman was not supposed to be much of a match for the Scott, a former president of Pasadena City College, whose assembly district boasted significantly more voters. He nevertheless made the race close, scoring 46.7% of the vote to Scott's 53.3%.

In 2001, several weeks after his tenure in the assembly had come to an end, Wildman lost another close race, this time for a seat on the Los Angeles City council. He came in third behind future mayor of Los Angeles Eric Garcetti and former councilman Mike Woo.

== Electoral history ==
Member, California State Assembly: 1986–1988
Year	Office	Democrat	Votes	Pct	Republican	Votes	Pct
1996	California State Assembly; District 43	Scott Wildman	49,452	48.4%	John Geranios	49,260	48.2%
1998	California State Assembly; District 43	Scott Wildman	37,112	65%	Peter Repovich	26,749	31.5%
2000	California State Senate; District 21	Jack Scott 53.3% Scott Wildman 46.7%	158,145	58.9%	Paul Zee	100,901	37.6%

Political offices
Preceded by Jim Rogan	California State Assembly 43rd District; 1996 – 2000	Succeeded by Dario Frommer
