= Pat Nolan =

American lawyer, politician and activist (b. 1950)

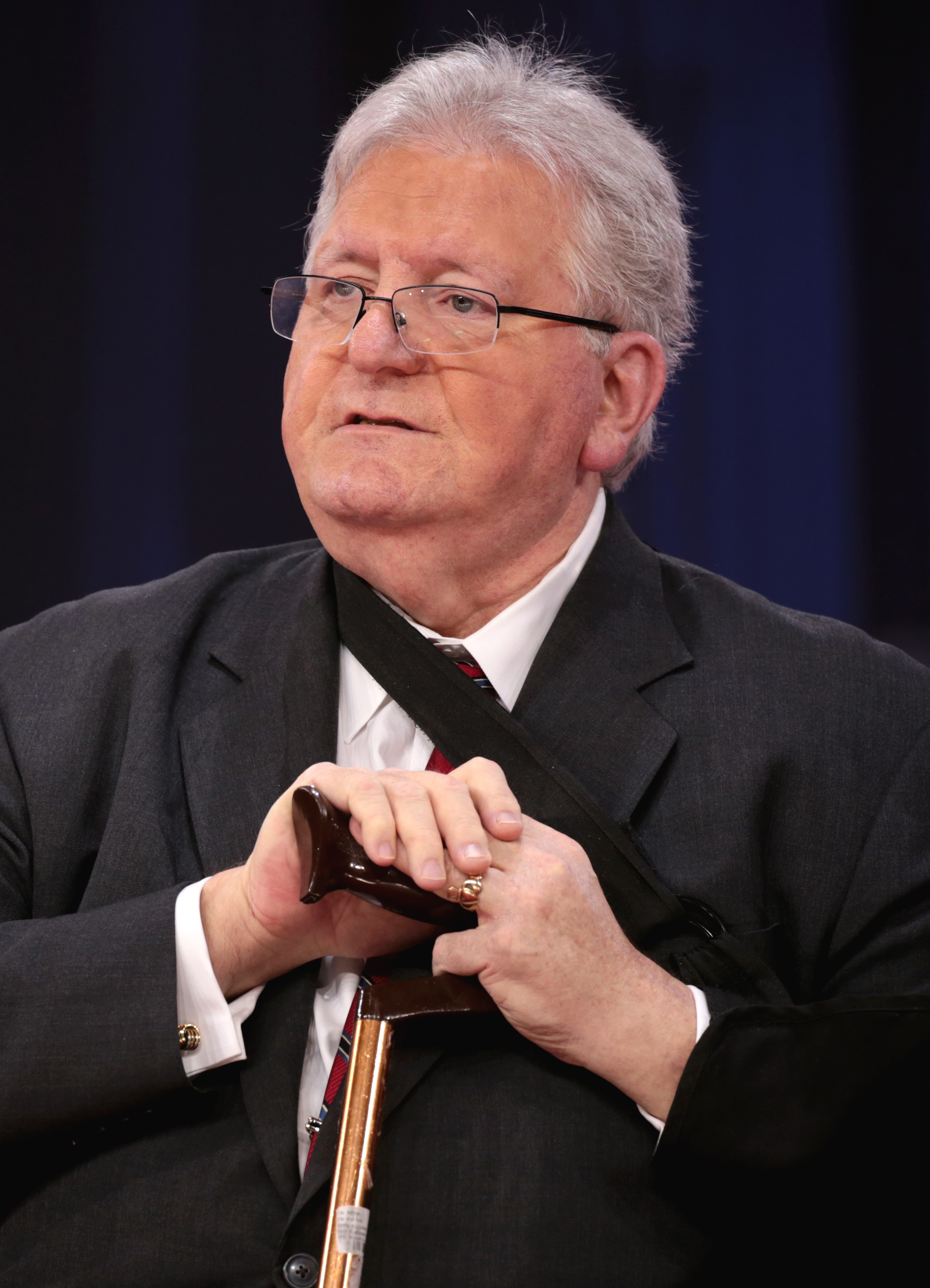
- Nolan in 2018

Minority Leader of the California Assembly
- In office November 8, 1984 – November 10, 1988
- Preceded by: Robert W. Naylor
- Succeeded by: Ross Johnson

Member of the California State Assembly
- In office December 4, 1978 – November 30, 1994
- Preceded by: Michael D. Antonovich
- Succeeded by: James E. Rogan
- Constituency: 41st district (1978–1992); 43rd district (1992–1994)

Personal details
- Born: Patrick James Nolan; June 16, 1950 (age 76) Los Angeles, California, U.S.
- Party: Republican
- Spouse: Gail
- Children: 3
- Education: University of Southern California

Patrick James Nolan (born June 16, 1950) is an American lawyer, politician and conservative activist.

== Political career ==
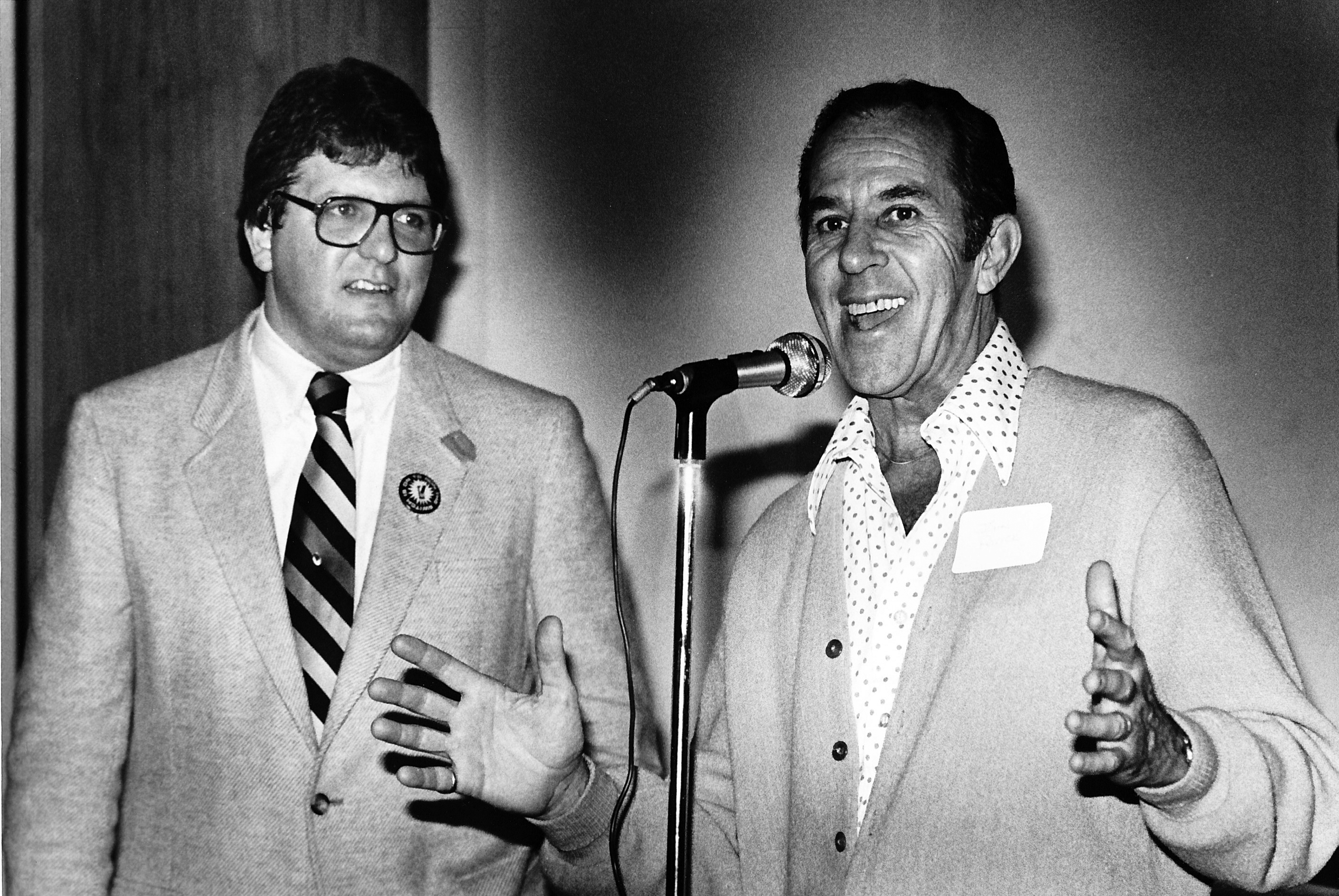
Pat Nolan looks on as children's TV host Sheriff John speaks at a public gathering. Circa 1980

In 1978, Nolan was elected to the California State Assembly, serving the 41st district comprising Glendale, Burbank, Toluca Lake and Sunland-Tujunga. He also served the 43rd district. from 1992 to 1994.

In 1984, he was elected Assembly Republican Leader, and began an aggressive campaign to elect a Republican majority in the Assembly.

== Conviction ==
Nolan was part of an FBI sting operation called Shrimpscam which targeted officials who accepted illegal campaign contributions. He was charged with seven counts of corruption. He entered into a plea deal and admitted to one count of racketeering in 1993. As a now convicted felon, Nolan resigned his seat and was sentenced to thirty three months in prison. He served 25 months in a federal prison and four months in a halfway house.

His experiences in prison changed his outlook and the course of his life.

== Corrections work ==
After his release, he was recruited by Chuck Colson's Prison Fellowship Ministries to be President of Justice Fellowship, the Prison Fellowship affiliate that works to reform the criminal justice system. During Nolan's time at Prison Fellowship, they have formed broad bi-partisan coalitions with civil rights and religious organizations to support important issues in Congress. They successfully protected religious freedom for prisoners in the Religious Freedom Restoration Act, and the Religious Land Use and Institutionalized Persons Act. A similar coalition successfully pressed for the passage of the Prison Rape Elimination Act. Nolan was later appointed to serve on the National Prison Rape Elimination Commission, a bipartisan panel aimed at curbing prison rape. Nolan also served on the Commission on Safety and Abuse in America's Prisons.

Prison Fellowship was a major force in another left-right coalition that developed legislation to focus prisons on preparing inmates to successfully return to their communities. Called the Second Chance Act, the bill had strong bi-partisan support and passed both houses overwhelmingly.

Nolan authored "When Prisoners Return" a guide for churches and community groups on ways they can help prisoners as they make the difficult transition from prison to their home community.

His racketeering conviction was pardoned by Donald Trump on May 15, 2019.

Pardon of Patrick Nolan by President Donald Trump.

== Personal life ==
Nolan's family includes his wife, Gail, and three children, Courtney, Katie and Jamie. They live in Leesburg, Virginia.

== See also ==
- List of people pardoned or granted clemency by the president of the United States

California Assembly
Preceded by Michael D. Antonovich	Member of the California Assembly from the 41st district 1978–1992	Succeeded by Terry B. Friedman
Preceded by Terry B. Friedman	Member of the California Assembly from the 43rd district 1992–1994	Succeeded by James E. Rogan
Party political offices
Preceded by Bob Naylor	Minority Leader of the California State Assembly; November 8, 1984–November 10, 1988	Succeeded by Ross Johnson
