= Howard J. Thelin =

American politician and judge (1921–2011)

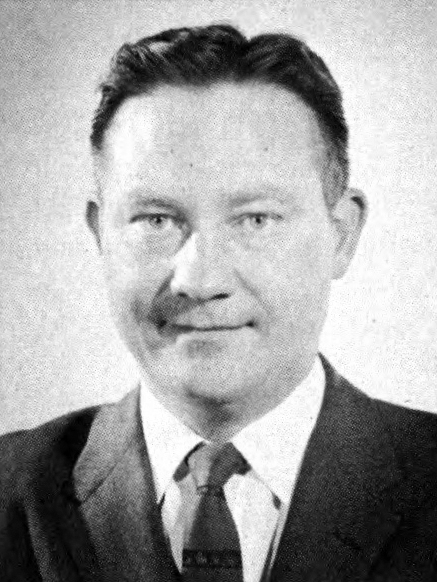
- Official portrait, 1961

Member of the California State Assembly from the 43rd district
- In office January 7, 1957 – December 28, 1966
- Preceded by: H. Allen Smith
- Succeeded by: Carlos Moorhead

Personal details
- Born: February 7, 1921 Van Nuys, California
- Died: March 25, 2011 (aged 90) Glendale, California
- Party: Republican

Military service
- Branch/service: United States Army
- Battles/wars: World War II

Howard James Thelin (February 7, 1921 – March 25, 2011) served in the California State Assembly for the 43rd district from 1957 to 1966 and as a Superior Court Justice. During World War II he served in the United States Army.
