= 1956 United States House of Representatives elections in California =

United States House of Representatives elections in California, 1956
- November 6, 1956

All 30 California seats to the United States House of Representatives
| | Majority party | Minority party |
|---|---|---|
| Party | Republican | Democratic |
| Last election | 19 | 11 |
| Seats won | 17 | 13 |
| Seat change | ▼2 | ▲2 |
| Popular vote | 2,467,620 | 2,710,700 |
| Percentage | 47.7% | 52.3% |
- Democratic: 50–60% 60–70% 70–80% >90% Republican: 50–60% 60–70% 70–80%

The California United States House of Representatives elections in California, 1956 was an election for California's delegation to the United States House of Representatives, which occurred as part of the general election of the House of Representatives on November 6, 1956. Democrats gained two seats from the Republicans. As of 2026, this is the last time that Republicans won a majority of congressional districts in California.

== Overview ==
United States House of Representatives elections in California, 1956
| Party | Votes | % | Before | After | +/– |
|---|---|---|---|---|---|
| Republican | 2,467,620 | 47.7% | 19 | 17 | -2 |
| Democratic | 2,710,700 | 52.3% | 11 | 13 | +2 |
| Totals | 5,178,320 | 100.0% | 30 | 30 | — |

== Results ==
Final results from the Clerk of the House of Representatives:

=== District 1 ===
California's 1st congressional district election, 1956
| Party | Candidate | Votes | % |
|---|---|---|---|
| Republican | Hubert B. Scudder (incumbent) | 102,604 | 53.6 |
| Democratic | Clement Woodnutt Miller | 88,962 | 46.4 |
| Total votes | | 191,566 | 100.0 |
| Turnout | | | |
| Republican hold | | | |

=== District 2 ===
California's 2nd congressional district election, 1956
| Party | Candidate | Votes | % |
|---|---|---|---|
| Democratic | Clair Engle (incumbent) | 136,544 | 100.0 |
| Turnout | | | |
| Democratic hold | | | |

=== District 3 ===
California's 3rd congressional district election, 1956
| Party | Candidate | Votes | % |
|---|---|---|---|
| Democratic | John E. Moss (incumbent) | 132,930 | 68.6 |
| Republican | Noel C. Stevenson | 60,889 | 31.4 |
| Total votes | | 193,819 | 100.0 |
| Turnout | | | |
| Democratic hold | | | |

=== District 4 ===
California's 4th congressional district election, 1956
| Party | Candidate | Votes | % |
|---|---|---|---|
| Republican | William S. Mailliard (incumbent) | 109,188 | 61.9 |
| Democratic | James L. Quigley | 67,132 | 38.1 |
| Total votes | | 176,320 | 100.0 |
| Turnout | | | |
| Republican hold | | | |

=== District 5 ===
California's 5th congressional district election, 1956
| Party | Candidate | Votes | % |
|---|---|---|---|
| Democratic | John F. Shelley (incumbent) | 104,358 | 100.0 |
| Turnout | | | |
| Democratic hold | | | |

=== District 6 ===
California's 6th congressional district election, 1956
| Party | Candidate | Votes | % |
|---|---|---|---|
| Republican | John F. Baldwin, Jr. (incumbent) | 98,683 | 53.7 |
| Democratic | H. Roberts Quinney | 84,965 | 46.3 |
| Total votes | | 183,648 | 100.0 |
| Turnout | | | |
| Republican hold | | | |

=== District 7 ===
California's 7th congressional district election, 1956
| Party | Candidate | Votes | % |
|---|---|---|---|
| Republican | John J. Allen, Jr. (incumbent) | 75,932 | 52.8 |
| Democratic | Laurance L. Cross | 67,931 | 47.2 |
| Total votes | | 143,863 | 100.0 |
| Turnout | | | |
| Republican hold | | | |

=== District 8 ===
California's 8th congressional district election, 1956
| Party | Candidate | Votes | % |
|---|---|---|---|
| Democratic | George P. Miller (incumbent) | 136,720 | 65.6 |
| Republican | Robert Lee Watkins | 71,700 | 34.4 |
| Total votes | | 208,420 | 100.0 |
| Turnout | | | |
| Democratic hold | | | |

=== District 9 ===
California's 9th congressional district election, 1956
| Party | Candidate | Votes | % |
|---|---|---|---|
| Republican | J. Arthur Younger (incumbent) | 96,388 | 60.3 |
| Democratic | James T. McKay | 63,504 | 39.7 |
| Total votes | | 159,892 | 100.0 |
| Turnout | | | |
| Republican hold | | | |

=== District 10 ===
California's 10th congressional district election, 1956
| Party | Candidate | Votes | % |
|---|---|---|---|
| Republican | Charles S. Gubser (incumbent) | 128,891 | 60.7 |
| Democratic | William H. Vatcher | 83,586 | 39.3 |
| Total votes | | 212,477 | 100.0 |
| Turnout | | | |
| Republican hold | | | |

=== District 11 ===
California's 11th congressional district election, 1956
| Party | Candidate | Votes | % |
|---|---|---|---|
| Democratic | John J. McFall | 70,630 | 53.1 |
| Republican | Justin L. Johnson (incumbent) | 62,448 | 46.9 |
| Total votes | | 133,078 | 100.0 |
| Turnout | | | |
| Democratic gain from Republican | | | |

=== District 12 ===
California's 12th congressional district election, 1956
| Party | Candidate | Votes | % |
|---|---|---|---|
| Democratic | Bernice F. Sisk (incumbent) | 109,920 | 73 |
| Republican | Robert B. Moore | 40,663 | 27 |
| Total votes | | 150,583 | 100 |
| Turnout | | | |
| Democratic hold | | | |

=== District 13 ===
California's 13th congressional district election, 1956
| Party | Candidate | Votes | % |
|---|---|---|---|
| Republican | Charles M. Teague (incumbent) | 104,009 | 59.6 |
| Democratic | William Kirk Stewart | 70,567 | 40.4 |
| Total votes | | 174,576 | 100.0 |
| Turnout | | | |
| Republican hold | | | |

=== District 14 ===
California's 14th congressional district election, 1956
| Party | Candidate | Votes | % |
|---|---|---|---|
| Democratic | Harlan Hagen (incumbent) | 94,461 | 63 |
| Republican | Myron F. Tisdel | 55,509 | 37 |
| Total votes | | 149,970 | 100 |
| Turnout | | | |
| Democratic hold | | | |

=== District 15 ===
California's 15th congressional district election, 1956
| Party | Candidate | Votes | % |
|---|---|---|---|
| Republican | Gordon L. McDonough (incumbent) | 97,182 | 57.9 |
| Democratic | Emery S. Petty | 70,681 | 42.1 |
| Total votes | | 167,863 | 100.0 |
| Turnout | | | |
| Republican hold | | | |

=== District 16 ===
California's 16th congressional district election, 1956
| Party | Candidate | Votes | % |
|---|---|---|---|
| Republican | Donald L. Jackson (incumbent) | 84,050 | 60.8 |
| Democratic | G. Robert "Bob" Fleming | 53,624 | 39.2 |
| Total votes | | 137,674 | 100.0 |
| Turnout | | | |
| Republican hold | | | |

=== District 17 ===
California's 17th congressional district election, 1956
| Party | Candidate | Votes | % |
|---|---|---|---|
| Democratic | Cecil R. King (incumbent) | 157,270 | 64.9 |
| Republican | Charles A. Franklin | 84,900 | 35.1 |
| Total votes | | 242,170 | 100.0 |
| Turnout | | | |
| Democratic hold | | | |

=== District 18 ===
California's 18th congressional district election, 1956
| Party | Candidate | Votes | % |
|---|---|---|---|
| Republican | Craig Hosmer (incumbent) | 103,108 | 59.3 |
| Democratic | Raymond C. "Ray" Simpson | 70,911 | 40.7 |
| Total votes | | 174,019 | 100.0 |
| Turnout | | | |
| Republican hold | | | |

=== District 19 ===
California's 19th congressional district election, 1956
| Party | Candidate | Votes | % |
|---|---|---|---|
| Democratic | Chet Holifield (incumbent) | 116,287 | 73.8 |
| Republican | Roy E. Reynolds | 41,269 | 26.2 |
| Total votes | | 157,556 | 100.0 |
| Turnout | | | |
| Democratic hold | | | |

=== District 20 ===
California's 20th congressional district election, 1956
| Party | Candidate | Votes | % |
|---|---|---|---|
| Republican | H. Allen Smith | 85,459 | 70.8 |
| Democratic | Eugene Radding | 35,249 | 29.2 |
| Total votes | | 120,708 | 100.0 |
| Turnout | | | |
| Republican hold | | | |

=== District 21 ===
California's 21st congressional district election, 1956
| Party | Candidate | Votes | % |
|---|---|---|---|
| Republican | Edgar W. Hiestand (incumbent) | 153,679 | 62.6 |
| Democratic | W. C. "Bill" Stethem | 91,683 | 37.4 |
| Total votes | | 245,362 | 100.0 |
| Turnout | | | |
| Democratic hold | | | |

=== District 22 ===
California's 22nd congressional district election, 1956
| Party | Candidate | Votes | % |
|---|---|---|---|
| Republican | Joseph F. Holt (incumbent) | 97,317 | 59.8 |
| Democratic | Irving Glasband | 65,314 | 40.2 |
| Total votes | | 162,631 | 100.0 |
| Turnout | | | |
| Republican hold | | | |

=== District 23 ===
California's 23rd congressional district election, 1956
| Party | Candidate | Votes | % |
|---|---|---|---|
| Democratic | Clyde Doyle (incumbent) | 120,109 | 70.9 |
| Republican | E. Elgie "Cal" Calvin | 49,198 | 29.1 |
| Total votes | | 169,207 | 100.0 |
| Turnout | | | |
| Democratic hold | | | |

=== District 24 ===
California's 24th congressional district election, 1956
| Party | Candidate | Votes | % |
|---|---|---|---|
| Republican | Glenard P. Lipscomb (incumbent) | 84,120 | 61.9 |
| Democratic | Fay Porter | 51,692 | 38.1 |
| Total votes | | 135,812 | 100.0 |
| Turnout | | | |
| Republican hold | | | |

=== District 25 ===
California's 25th congressional district election, 1956
| Party | Candidate | Votes | % |
|---|---|---|---|
| Republican | Patrick J. Hillings (incumbent) | 166,305 | 63.8 |
| Democratic | John S. Sobieski | 94,180 | 36.2 |
| Total votes | | 260,485 | 100.0 |
| Turnout | | | |
| Republican hold | | | |

=== District 26 ===
California's 26th congressional district election, 1956
| Party | Candidate | Votes | % |
|---|---|---|---|
| Democratic | James Roosevelt (incumbent) | 133,036 | 68.8 |
| Republican | Edward H. Gibbons | 60,230 | 31.2 |
| Total votes | | 193,266 | 100.0 |
| Turnout | | | |
| Democratic hold | | | |

=== District 27 ===
California's 27th congressional district election, 1956
| Party | Candidate | Votes | % |
|---|---|---|---|
| Democratic | Harry R. Sheppard (incumbent) | 124,662 | 100.0 |
| Turnout | | | |
| Democratic hold | | | |

=== District 28 ===
California's 28th congressional district election, 1956
| Party | Candidate | Votes | % |
|---|---|---|---|
| Republican | James B. Utt (incumbent) | 159,456 | 64.5 |
| Democratic | Gordon T. Shepard | 87,691 | 35.5 |
| Total votes | | 247,147 | 100.0 |
| Turnout | | | |
| Republican hold | | | |

=== District 29 ===
California's 29th congressional district election, 1956
| Party | Candidate | Votes | % |
|---|---|---|---|
| Democratic | Dalip Singh Saund | 54,989 | 51.5 |
| Republican | Jacqueline Cochran Odlum | 51,690 | 48.5 |
| Total votes | | 106,679 | 100.0 |
| Turnout | | | |
| Democratic gain from Republican | | | |

=== District 30 ===
California's 30th congressional district election, 1956
| Party | Candidate | Votes | % |
|---|---|---|---|
| Republican | Bob Wilson (incumbent) | 142,753 | 66.7 |
| Democratic | George A. Cheney | 71,112 | 33.3 |
| Total votes | | 213,865 | 100.0 |
| Turnout | | | |
| Republican hold | | | |

== See also ==
- 85th United States Congress
- Political party strength in California
- Political party strength in U.S. states
- 1956 United States House of Representatives elections
