= European Inventor Award =

Annual award by the European Patent Office

The European Inventor Award (formerly European Inventor of the Year Award, renamed in 2010), are presented annually by the European Patent Office, sometimes supported by the respective Presidency of the Council of the European Union and by the European Commission, to inventors who have made a significant contribution to innovation, economy and society, predominantly in Europe. Inventions from all technological fields are considered for this award. The winners in each category are presented with an award shaped like a sail. There is no cash prize associated with the award, however there is a cash prize for all 3 of the Young Inventors Prize finalists.

== Award categories and prizes ==
The European Inventor Award is presented in the following five categories and two prizes:

- Industry
- Research
- Non-European countries (Non-EPOs)
- Small and medium-sized enterprises (SMEs)
- Lifetime Achievement
- Young Inventors Prize (introduced in 2022, and consisting of 3rd, 2nd and 1st place prizes)
- Popular Prize (from among the finalists introduced in 2013, and decided by a public vote)

== Nomination and selection ==
Each year the European Patent Office calls on its patent examiners, on examiners at the patent offices in the EPO's member states and on public at large to propose inventions for the award that were patented at the European Patent Office and have made a significant contribution towards innovation, economy and society in Europe.

A short list of nominees is then drawn up from the proposals and submitted to an international jury. The independent jury selects three inventors in each category for the final round, and eventually chooses the winners.

== Awards per year ==
=== 2006 ===
The first European Inventor of the Year awards ceremony took place at the AutoWorld Museum in Brussels, Belgium on 3 May 2006. Prizes were presented in six categories.

The 2006 winners were:

- Industry: Zbigniew Janowicz (Poland) and Cornelis Hollenberg, (Germany) who invented a method for making proteins in Pichia (Hansenula) yeast.
- Research: Peter Grünberg for his discovery of the giant magnetoresistance (GMR) effect.
- Non-EPO countries: Larry Gold and Craig Tuerk, who discovered that nucleic acids can bind a protein to potentially intercept other proteins that cause diseases like age-related macular degeneration (AMD).
- SMEs: Stephen P.A. Fodor, Michael C. Pirrung, J. Leighton Read, and Lubert Stryer who invented the DNA microarray (DNA chip).
- New EU member states: John Starrett, Joanne Bronson, John Martin, Muzammil Mansuri, and David Tortolani, for their prodrugs of phosphonates.
- Lifetime Achievement: Federico Faggin, for inventing the microprocessor.

=== 2007 ===
The second European Inventor of the Year awards ceremony took place at the International Congress Center in Munich, Germany on 18 April 2007. Prizes were presented to inventors - individuals and teams - in five categories.

The 2007 winners were:

- Industry: Franz Lärmer and Andrea Urban, Bosch GmbH (Germany), for their Bosch process for microfabrication.
- Research: Catia Bastioli and her team at Novamont S.p.A. (Italy), for inventing biodegradable plastics made from starch.
- Non-EPO countries: Joseph P. Vacca and the team at Merck Research Laboratories (USA), for Crixivan, a protease inhibitor.
- SMEs: Catia Bastioli and her team at Novamont S.p.A. (Italy), for inventing biodegradable plastics made from starch.
- Lifetime Achievement: Marc Feldmann, Kennedy Institute of Rheumatology (United Kingdom), for identifying the role of cytokines in treating autoimmune diseases.

=== 2008 ===
The third European Inventor of the Year awards ceremony took place in Ljubljana, Slovenia on 6 May 2008, marking Slovenia's presidency of the EU Council in the first half of 2008. Prizes were presented to inventors - individuals and teams - in five categories.

The 2008 winners were:

- Industry: Norbert Enning, Ulrich Klages, Heinrich Timm, Gundolf Kreis, Alois Feldschmid, Christian Dornberg and Karl Reiter, Audi (Germany) for revolutionising automotive manufacturing by making car frames lighter and safer through the use of aluminium.
- Research: Douglas Anderson, Robert Henderson, and Roger Lucas of Scotland's SME Optos (United Kingdom) for developing a new laser scanning technology for the eye which allows powerful but pain-free examination of the retina.
- Non-EPO countries: Philip S. Green, SRI International (USA) for developing a robotic surgical system that has helped to improve surgery in Europe by allowing surgeons to perform complex procedures with the highest precision.
- SMEs: Douglas Anderson, Robert Henderson, and Roger Lucas of Scotland's SME Optos (United Kingdom) for developing a new laser scanning technology for the eye which allows powerful but pain-free examination of the retina.
- Lifetime Achievement: Erik De Clercq, University of Leuven (Belgium) for landmark contributions to antiviral treatment, including developing the drug cocktail for HIV/AIDS which has become the therapy gold standard of the early 21st century.

=== 2009 ===
The European Inventor of the Year awards ceremony took place at Prague Castle, in Prague, Czech Republic on 28 April 2009.

The 2009 winners were:

- Industry: Jürg Zimmermann (Switzerland) and Brian Drucker (USA) for inventing an effective drug to combat chronic myelogenous leukaemia.
- Research: Joseph Le Mer (France) for inventing a heat exchanger of such a brilliantly simple design that it makes heating systems both inexpensive and energy-efficient.
- Non-EPO countries: Zhou Yiqing and his team (China) for an anti-malaria drug based on a herbal agent, which has been instrumental in saving hundreds of thousands of lives.
- SMEs: Joseph Le Mer (France) for inventing a heat exchanger of such a brilliantly simple design that it makes heating systems both inexpensive and energy-efficient.
- Lifetime Achievement: Adolf Goetzberger (Germany) for his work on the commercial use of solar energy, helping to make solar cells a viable alternative to fossil fuels.

=== 2010 ===
Renamed the European Inventor Award, the 2010 awards ceremony took place in Madrid, Spain on 28 April 2010. The ceremony at the Eurostars Madrid Tower Hotel was attended by Their Royal Highnesses Prince Felipe and Princess Letizia of Asturias.

The 2010 winners were:

- Industry: Albert Markendorf (Switzerland) and Raimund Loser (Germany), whose portable 3D scanning and measuring system opened up a new level of accuracy in industrial measuring systems and revolutionised the field.
- Research: Jürgen Pfitzer and Helmut Nägele (Germany), who made a breakthrough by developing an easily formable, biodegradable organic polymer.
- Non-EPO countries: Sanjai Kohli and Steven Chen (USA), whose work paved the way for global positioning systems (GPS) that became used commercially and are a part of our everyday lives (joint winners).
- Non-EPO countries: Ben Wiens and Danny Epps (Canada), who developed electrochemical fuel cells which are now a commercially successful alternative to fossil fuels (joint winners).
- SMEs: Jürgen Pfitzer and Helmut Nägele (Germany), who made a breakthrough by developing an easily formable, biodegradable organic polymer.
- Lifetime Achievement: Wolfgang Krätschmer (Germany), who discovered a whole new field of research in physics.

=== 2011 ===
The 2011 award ceremony took place at the historic Hungarian Academy of Sciences in Budapest, Hungary.

The 2011 winners were:

- Industry: Ann Lambrechts, Bekaert (Belgium). Her invention opened up a world of new architectural possibilities by improving the bending strength of reinforced concrete structures. The steel fibre elements that she developed greatly increase the tensile strength of concrete, reduce construction time, and have enabled many spectacular new structures such as the Gotthard tunnel.
- Research: Christine Van Broeckhoven, Vlaams Interuniversitair Instituut voor Biotechnologie (Belgium). Her pioneering method for identifying disease genes in Alzheimer's sufferers paved the way for developing modern drugs and treatments to combat Alzheimer's disease. Each of the genes and proteins that Broeckhoven has identified acts as potential "target" for researchers working to develop treatments for neurodegenerative diseases.
- Non-EPO countries: Ashok Gadgil, Vikas Garud, University of California, Lawrence Berkeley National Laboratory, WaterHealth International (USA/India). Using gravity and a carefully planned hydraulics design to ensure even water flow, their ultraviolet (UV) disinfection device requires only a 40 watt UV light bulb to disinfect 1,000 litres of water per hour. The water purification device has been installed in more than ten countries worldwide, delivering clean water to over two million people.
- SMEs: Jens Dall Bentzen, Dall Energy Aps (Denmark). His special low-emission furnace burns biofuels with a moisture content of up to 60% and is thus ideal for eco-friendly, highly efficient and hence inexpensive power generation from biomass in factories and production plants.
- Lifetime Achievement: Per-Ingvar Brånemark (Sweden). He is the pioneer of osseointegration, now a widely practised medical method based on titanium implants, which creates a stable connection between the implant and bone. Today it is a standard implant technique among dentists and is widely used in reconstructive surgery. Millions of people worldwide have benefited from his landmark method.

=== 2012 ===
The 2012 award ceremony was held in Copenhagen at the Royal Danish Playhouse in the presence of Their Royal Highnesses Crown Prince Frederik and Crown Princess Mary of Denmark.

The 2012 winners were:

- Industry: Jan Tøpholm, Søren Westermann, and Svend Vitting Andersen (Denmark), for their tailor-made hearing aid.
- Research: Gilles Gosselin, Jean-Louis Imbach, and Martin L. Bryant (France), for their new drug for hepatitis B treatment.
- Non-EPO countries: John O' Sullivan, Graham Daniels, Terence Percival, Diethelm Ostry, and John Deane (Australia), for their contribution to wireless local area networks (LAN) for high speed data transfer (Wi-Fi).
- SMEs: Manfred Stefener, Oliver Freitag, and Jens Müller (Germany), for their portable direct methanol fuel cell.
- Lifetime Achievement: Josef Bille (Germany), for his device for laser eye surgery.

=== 2013 ===
The 2013 award ceremony was held in Amsterdam at Beurs van Berlage in the presence of Her Royal Highness Princess Beatrix of the Netherlands.

The 2013 winners were:

- Industry: Claus Hämmerle and Klaus Brüstle (Austria) from Austrian manufacturer Julius Blum for inventing a damper system for soft closing of furniture doors, drawers, and wall cabinets named Blumotion.
- Research: Patrick Couvreur, Barbara Stella, Véronique Rosilio, Luigi Cattel (France, Italy) for inventing nanocapsules which destroy cancer cells without harming healthy tissue.
- Non-EPO countries: Ajay V. Bhatt, Bala Sudarshan Cadambi, Jeff Morriss, Shaun Knoll, Shelagh Callahan (USA), for creating and developing Universal Serial Bus (USB) technology.
- SMEs: Pål Nyrén (Sweden) for inventing pyrosequencing, a far faster, simpler, and cheaper method to sequence DNA strands.
- Lifetime Achievement: Martin Schadt (Switzerland), inventor of the world's first flat-panel liquid crystal display (LCD).

For the first time, the public was invited to vote to select the winner of a Popular Prize from among the 15 finalists. The winner in this category is José Luis López Gómez (Spain) from Patentes Talgo, whose invention to use a unique 'independent guided' wheel design rather than a standard axle on high-speed passenger trains makes those trains some of the most comfortable and safe in the industry.

=== 2014 ===
The 2014 award ceremony was held in Berlin at Deutsche Telekom's Berlin Representative Office (Former Kaiserliches Telegrafenamt) on 17 June.

The 2014 winners were:

- Industry: Koen Andries (BE), Jérôme Guillemont (FR), Imre Csoka (FR), Laurence F.F. Marconnet-Decrane (FR), Frank C. Odds (UK), Jozef F.E. Van Gestel (BE), Marc Venet (FR), Daniel Vernier (FR) for their invention: the drug against multi-resistant tuberculosis
- Research: Christofer Toumazou (UK) for his microchip for quick DNA testing
- Non-EPO countries: Charles W. Hull (US) for inventing 3D printing (stereolithography)
- SMEs: Peter Holme Jensen, Claus Hélix-Nielsen, Danielle Keller (DK) for their energy-efficient water purification
- Lifetime Achievement: Artur Fischer (DE) for his wall plug, synchronised flash, and many more.
- Popular Prize: Masahiro Hara, Takayuki Nagaya, Motoaki Watabe, Tadao Nojiri, Yuji Uchiyama (JP) for developing the QR code.

=== 2015 ===
The 2015 award ceremony was held in Paris at Palais Brongniart (La Bourse) on 11 June. The 2015 winners were:

- Industry: Franz Amtmann (AT), et al., and Philippe Maugars (FR), et al., who invented near field communication (NFC) technology
- Research: Ludwik Leibler (FR) for his vitrimers – a new class of polymers
- Non-EPO countries: Sumio Iijima, Akira Koshio, and Masako Yudasaka (JP) for inventing carbon nanotubes
- SMEs: Laura J. van 't Veer, et al. (NL) for their gene-based breast cancer test
- Lifetime Achievement: Andreas Manz (CH) for his microchip-sized analysis system
- Popular Prize: Ian Frazer (AUS), Jian Zhou† (CN) who developed the HPV vaccine

=== 2016 ===
The 2016 award ceremony was held in Lisbon on 9 June. The 2016 winners were:

- Industry: Bernhard Gleich, Jürgen Weizenecker, and their team (Germany) for inventing magnetic particle imaging (MPI)
- Research: Alim-Louis Benabid (France) for his work on a treatment for Parkinson's disease
- Non-EPO countries: Robert Langer (USA) for his work on targeted anti-cancer drugs
- SMEs: Tue Johannessen, Ulrich Quaade, Claus Hviid Christensen, Jens Kehlet Nørskov (Denmark) for their ammonia storage to reduce nitrogen oxides (NOx)
- Lifetime Achievement: Anton van Zanten (Germany/Netherlands) for his electronic stability control system
- Popular Prize: Helen Lee (UK/France) for inventing diagnostic kits for resource-poor regions of the globe.

=== 2017 ===
The 2017 award ceremony was held in Venice on 15 June. The 2017 winners were:

- Industry: Jan van den Boogaart and Oliver Hayden (Netherlands/Austria) for inventing a rapid blood test for malaria
- Research: Laurent Lestarquit, José Ángel Ávila Rodríguez, Günter W. Hein, Jean-Luc Issler and Lionel Ries (France, Spain, Germany, Belgium) for inventing radio signals for better satellite navigation (Galileo (satellite navigation))
- Non-EPO countries: James G. Fujimoto, Eric A. Swanson and Robert Huber (USA, Germany) for their work on medical imaging with optical coherence tomography (OCT)
- SMEs: Günter Hufschmid (Germany) for his supersponge for oil spills
- Lifetime Achievement: Rino Rappuoli (Italy) for his next-generation vaccines against meningitis, whooping cough and other infections
- Popular Prize: Adnane Remmal (Morocco) for boosting antibiotics with essential oils

=== 2018 ===
The 2018 award ceremony was held in Saint-Germain-en-Laye, Paris, on 7 June. The 2018 winners were:

- Industry: Agnès Poulbot and Jacques Barraud† (France) for inventing an auto-regenerating tyre tread
- Research: Jens Frahm (Germany) for inventing faster, real-time MRI
- Non-EPO countries: Esther Sans Takeuchi (US) for inventing batteries to reset the heart
- SMEs: Jane ní Dhulchaointigh (Ireland) for inventing Sugru, the multi-purpose mouldable glue
- Lifetime Achievement: Ursula Keller (Switzerland) for inventing ultrafast pulsed lasers
- Popular Prize: Erik Loopstra and Vadim Banine (The Netherlands/Russia) for inventing extreme ultraviolet lithography

=== 2019 ===
The 2019 award ceremony was held in Vienna, Austria, on 20 June. The 2019 winners were:

- Industry: Klaus Feichtinger and Manfred Hackl (Austria) for inventing higher-performance plastic recycling
- Research: Jérôme Galon (France) for inventing Immunoscore®, a clearer cancer test
- Non-EPO countries: Akira Yoshino (Japan) for inventing the lithium-ion battery and its evolution
- SMEs: Rik Breur (the Netherlands) for his marine antifouling fibre wrap
- Lifetime Achievement: Margarita Salas Falgueras (Spain) for inventing DNA amplification for genomics
- Popular Prize: Margarita Salas Falgueras (Spain) for inventing DNA amplification for genomics

=== 2020 ===
The 2020 award was deferred to the following year due to the pandemic.

=== 2021 ===
The 2021 award ceremony was held digitally on 17 June. The 2021 winners were:

- Industry: Per Gisle Djupesland (Norway) for inventing a device for better nasal drug delivery
- Research: Robert N. Grass and Wendelin Stark (Austria/Switzerland) for their DNA-based data storage
- Non-EPO countries: Sumita Mitra (India/USA) for restoring smiles with nanomaterials
- SMEs: Henrik Lindström and Giovanni Fili (Sweden) for inventing flexible solar cells for portable devices
- Lifetime Achievement: Karl Leo (Germany) for his lifetime work in organic semiconductors
- Popular Prize: Gordana Vunjak-Novakovic (Serbia/USA) who dedicated her career to advances in tissue engineering

=== 2022 ===
The 2022 award ceremony was held digitally on 21 June. The 2022 winners were:

- Industry: Jaan Leis, Mati Arulepp, and Anti Perkson (Estonia) for the optimization of curved graphene, a material used to make highly-efficient supercapacitors
- Research: Elena García Armada (Spain) for the world's first adaptable robotic exoskeleton for children
- Non-EPO countries: Donald Sadoway (Canada/USA) for inventing liquid metal batteries for storing renewable energy
- SMEs: Madiha Derouazi (Switzerland), Elodie Belnoue (France) and their team for inventing a therapeutic vaccine platform to treat cancer
- Young Inventors Prize
  - Joint 1st Prize and €20,000: Victor Dewulf and Peter Hedley (Belgium/UK) for AI-driven waste management
  - Joint 1st Prize and €20,000: Erin Smith (USA) for AI to detect Parkinson's disease earlier in patients
  - 2nd Prize and €10,000: Rafaella de Bona Gonçalves (Brazil) for biodegradable pads and tampons to combat period poverty
- Lifetime Achievement: Katalin Karikó (Hungary/USA) for her lifetime work on modified mRNA for lifesaving vaccines and therapies
- Popular Prize: Elena García Armada (Spain) for the world's first adaptable robotic exoskeleton for children

=== 2023 ===
The 2023 award ceremony was held in Valencia, Spain. The 2023 winners were:

- Industry: Pia Bergström, Annika Malm, Jukka Myllyoja, Jukka-Pekka Pasanen and Blanka Toukoniitty (Finland) for converting waste and residues into high-quality renewable solutions.
- Research: Patricia de Rango, Daniel Fruchart, Albin Chaise, Michel Jehan and Nataliya Skryabina (France) inventing a safe and sustainable way to store hydrogen.
- Non-EPO countries: Kai Wu (China) on Li-ion batteries
- SMEs: Rhona Togher and Eimear O'Carroll (Ireland) on reducing noise with an advanced acoustic material.
- Young Inventors Prize
  - 1st Prize and €20,000: Richard Turere (Kenya) for his affordable light system to save both livestock and predators better known as Lion lights
  - 2nd Prize and €10,000: Filipa de Sousa Rocha (Portugal), for her accessible programming for visually impaired children
  - 3rd Prize and €5,000: Fionn Ferreira (Ireland) for removing microplastics from water
- Lifetime Achievement: Avelino Corma Canós (Spain), a chemist, pioneer in the field of catalysts
- Popular Prize: Patricia de Rango, Daniel Fruchart, Albin Chaise, Michel Jehan, and Nataliya Skryabina (France) inventing a safe and sustainable way to store hydrogen.

== Juries ==
For the 2006 awards, the jury was:

- Wim Kok, former Prime Minister, the Netherlands (chairman)
- Gilles Capart, Chairman of PROTON Europe, Belgium
- Dimitri F. Dimitriou, CEO of DyoDelta Biosciences, United Kingdom
- Leif Edvinsson, Director of Intellectual Capital at Skandia, Sweden
- Robert Peugeot, Executive Vice President at PSA Peugeot-Citroën, France
- Maive Rute, SME Envoy for the European Commission, Estonia
- Paul Rübig, founding member of the SME Union, Austria

The jury in 2007–2008 was:

- Nani Beccalli-Falco, President and CEO of GE International in Brussels, Belgium
- Franjo Bobinac, President of the management board and CEO of Gorenje gospondinjski aparati in Velenje, Slovenia
- Kastitis Gecas, Director of the Lithuanian Innovation Centre in Vilnius, Lithuania
- N. R. Narayana Murthy, chairman and Chief Mentor at Infosys Technologies Limited in Bangalore, India
- Ruud Peters, Executive Vice President and CEO of Philips International in Eindhoven, The Netherlands
- Edoardo Tusacciu, President of PlastWood s.r.l in Calangianus, Italy
- Eugene van As, chairman at Sappi Limited in Johannesburg, South Africa
- Carmen Vela Olmo, managing director of INGENASA in Madrid, Spain
- Wang Zhibiao, President of the Chongqing Haifu Technology Co., Ltd in Chongqing, China

The jury in 2009–2010 was:

- Jürgen Dormann, chairman of the board at Metall Zug AG
- Zbyněk Frolík, managing director of LINET spol. s r.o.
- Bowman Heiden, Operations Director for the Qatar Science & Technology Park
- Jonathan Liebenau, Reader in Technology Management at the London School of Economics
- Emma Marcegaglia, managing director of Marcegaglia S.p.A.
- Olivier Tardy, Senior Partner and managing director at the Boston Consulting Group in Paris
- Sylvester Vizi, former President of the Hungarian Academy of Sciences
- Ernst-Ludwig Winnacker, Secretary General of the European Research Council

The jury in 2011 was:

- Jerzy Buzek, President of the European Parliament
- Wolfgang Heckl, Director General of the Deutsches Museum
- Bowman Heiden, Innovation Director for the Qatar Science & Technology Park
- Emma Marcegaglia, managing director of Marcegaglia S.p.A. and President of Confindustria
- Ernő Rubik, architect, designer, university professor and inventor of the Rubik's Cube
- Margarita Salas, President of Royal Board of the Biblioteca Nacional de España (National Library of Spain) and the Institute of Predictive and Personalized Medicine of Cancer
- Thierry Sueur, Vice President of Intellectual Property and of European and International Affairs at Air Liquide

The jury in 2012 was:

- Jerzy Buzek, President of the European Parliament
- Wolfgang Heckl, Director General of the Deutsches Museum
- Emma Marcegaglia, managing director of Marcegaglia S.p.A. and President of Confindustria
- Peter Marsh, manufacturing editor at the Financial Times
- Agnete Raaschou-Nielsen, A PhD in economics and senior manager with companies such as Aalborg Portland, Coca-Cola and Carlsberg
- Ernő Rubik, architect, designer, university professor and inventor of the Rubik's Cube
- Margarita Salas, President of Royal Board of the Biblioteca Nacional de España (National Library of Spain) and the Institute of Predictive and Personalized Medicine of Cancer
- Thierry Sueur, Vice President of Intellectual Property and of European and International Affairs at Air Liquide

The 2013 jury was:

- Jens Dall Bentzen, biomass scientist, owner of Denmark-based Dall Energy Aps
- Wolfgang Heckl, Director General of the Deutsches Museum and professor of scientific communication at the School of Education at the Technical University of Munich
- Ann Lambrechts, Head of R&D for Building Products at NV Bekaert (Belgium).
- Peter Marsh, manufacturing editor at the Financial Times
- Mario Moretti Polegato, inventor of the Geox shoe
- Blanka Říhová, professor, researcher in the field of anti-cancer drug development.
- Ernő Rubik, architect, designer, university professor and inventor of the Rubik's Cube
- Martin Schulz, President of the European Parliament and leader of the Party of European Socialists (PES).
- Thierry Sueur, Vice President of Intellectual Property and of European and International Affairs at Air Liquide

The 2014 jury was:

- Gerhard Cromme, chairman of the supervisory board of Siemens AG and member of the supervisory board of Axel Springer AG.
- Wolfgang M. Heckl, Director General of the Deutsches Museum in Munich
- Mandy Haberman, British inventor and entrepreneur whose inventions include the Haberman® Feeder, used in hospitals throughout the world for over 30 years, and the Anywayup® cup, which since its launch in 1996 has revolutionised the nursery market with its non-spill technology
- Patrick Couvreur, Winner of the European Inventor Award 2013 and prolific researcher and innovator
- Aino Heikkinen-Mustonen, engineer, inventor and managing director of Fatec Ltd
- Mario Moretti Polegato, Chairman of the Italian Geox Group
- Ernö Rubik, architect, designer, university professor and inventor of several mechanical puzzles, including the Rubik's Cube
- Tony Tangena, president of the epi

The 2015 jury was:

- Louis Schweitzer – chair, General Commissioner for Investment (appointed by the French President), Chairman of France's Foreign Affairs Council and special representative of the French Foreign Minister for Japan
- Gerhard Cromme, chairman of the supervisory board of Siemens AG and member of the supervisory board of Axel Springer AG.
- Ayşe Odman Boztosun, member of the Akdeniz University Faculty of Law in Antalya, Turkey. She serves as the Head of the Private Law Section and also as the executive director of the University Technology Transfer Office.
- Clara Gaymard, CEO and President of GE France since 2006. In January 2013, she was elected president of the American Chamber of Commerce in France (AmCham France), becoming the first female president of this organisation in its hundred-year history
- Mandy Haberman, British inventor and entrepreneur whose inventions include the Haberman® Feeder, used in hospitals throughout the world for over 30 years, and the Anywayup® cup, which since its launch in 1996 has revolutionised the nursery market with its non-spill technology
- Anna Haupt, developer of the "invisible" bike helmet together with Terese Alstin. They began their quest for the "helmet of the future" as industrial design students at Lund University, Sweden.
- Wolfgang M. Heckl, Director General of the Deutsches Museum in Munich
- Ingeborg Hochmair, CEO, CTO and co-founder of MED-EL Medical Electronics Corporation, which she founded together with her husband Dr Erwin Hochmair in 1990. Together, they developed the very first microelectronic multichannel cochlear implant
- Tian Lipu, Commissioner of China's State Intellectual Property Office from 2005 to 2014 and Member of the 17th CPC Central Commission for Discipline Inspection.
- Mario Moretti Polegato, Chairman of the Italian Geox Group
- Ernö Rubik, architect, designer, university professor and inventor of several mechanical puzzles, including the Rubik's Cube
- Tony Tangena, president of the epi
- Christine Van Broeckhoven, best known for her pioneering research into neurodegenerative dementias, where she has made several seminal contributions

The 2016 jury was:

- José Luís Arnaut, who served as Portuguese Deputy Prime Minister between 2002 and 2004.
- António Campinos, executive director of the European Union Intellectual Property Office (EUIPO) since 2010.
- Mandy Haberman, British inventor and entrepreneur whose inventions include the Haberman® Feeder, used in hospitals throughout the world for over 30 years, and the Anywayup® cup, which since its launch in 1996 has revolutionised the nursery market with its non-spill technology
- Wolfgang M. Heckl, Director General of the Deutsches Museum in Munich
- Ingeborg Hochmair, past European Inventor Award finalist and CEO, CTO and co-founder of MED-EL Medical Electronics Corporation, which she founded together with her husband Dr Erwin Hochmair in 1990. Together, they developed the very first microelectronic multichannel cochlear implant.
- Richard L. Hudson, a leading science and technology journalist in Europe for more than 30 years. He is CEO and Editor of ScienceIBusiness, a media company dedicated to European innovation strategy.
- Ivars Kalvins, Chairman of the Scientific Board of the Latvian Institute of Organic Synthesis and past European Inventor Award finalist. With nearly 260 inventions and over 900 patents and patent applications, he is one of the world's most prolific scientists and inventors in the field of medicinal chemistry, having developed a new generation of drugs mimicking natural compounds for targeted treatment and prevention of heart disease, stroke, Alzheimer's and cancer.
- Mario Moretti Polegato, Chairman of the Italian Geox Group
- Ernö Rubik, is an architect, designer, university professor and inventor of several mechanical puzzles, including the Rubik's Cube.
- Laura van 't Veer, co-founder and Chief Research Officer of Agendia, a company offering molecular cancer diagnostics. She won the European Inventor Award 2015 in the SMEs category
- Cecilia Wikström, member of the European Parliament, representing the Group of the Alliance of Liberals and Democrats for Europe, since 2009.

The 2017 jury was:

- Eleni Antoniadou, President of the European Health Parliament in Brussels and multidisciplinary researcher in regenerative medicine, artificial organ bioengineering and space medicine.
- José Luís Arnaut, who served as Portuguese Deputy Prime Minister between 2002 and 2004.
- António Campinos, executive director of the European Union Intellectual Property Office (EUIPO) since 2010.
- Virna Cerne, finalist in the European Inventor Award 2016 in the Industry category and director of the Research & Development Centre and a member of the executive board at the Dr Schär group in Triest, Italy.
- Tore Curstedt, finalist in the European Inventor Award 2016 in the Lifetime Achievement category and one of the world's foremost experts in surfactant research
- Dora Groó is responsible for international affairs at the Institute of Fisheries and Aquaculture of Hungary's National Agricultural Research and Innovation Centre, and President of the Association of Hungarian Women in Science
- Wolfgang M. Heckl, Director General of the Deutsches Museum in Munich
- Roger Highfield, Director of External Affairs at the Science Museum Group
- Ingeborg Hochmair, finalist European Inventor Award 2014 in the Lifetime Achievement category and CEO, CTO and co-founder of MED-EL Medical Electronics Corporation
- Helen Lee a researcher with an outstanding career in diagnostics and winner of the European Inventor Award 2016 in the Popular Prize category.
- Angelika Niebler, German politician and member of the European Parliament (MEP) for Bavaria with the Christian Social Union
- Mario Moretti Polegato, inventor of the Geox shoe and chair of the jury

The 2019 jury was:

- Ulrike Rabmer-Koller, chair, President of SMEunited, the association of Crafts and SMEs in Europe
- Eleni Antoniadou, a researcher in regenerative medicine and bioastronautics
- Benoît Battistelli, ex president of the European Patent Office (2010–2018)
- Wolfgang Heckl, professor at the Technical University of Munich
- Roger Highfield, director of External Affairs at the Science Museum Group
- Ursula Keller, professor at the ETH Zurich
- Helen Lee, associate professor at Cambridge University
- Francis Leyder, President of the Institute of Professional Representatives before the European Patent Office
- Elmar Mock, Swiss inventor, entrepreneur and serial innovator
- Massimo Sideri, journalist and writer
- Agnė Šimukovičė, journalist
- Thierry Sueur, Air Liquid Vice President

The 2021 jury was:

- Helen Lee, associate professor at Cambridge University and founder of Diagnostics for the Real World Ltd. She is the winner of the European Inventor Award 2016 in the Popular Prize category
- Benoît Battistelli, ex president of the European Patent Office (2010–2018)
- Sylwia Czubkowska, journalist at the Polish newspaper Gazeta Wyborcza
- Jens Frahm is a biophysicist and Director of the Biomedical NMR Research Group at the Max Planck Institute for Biophysical Chemistry in Göttingen, Germany.
- Wolfgang Heckl, Director General of the Deutsches Museum in Munich
- Roger Highfield, director of External Affairs at the Science Museum Group
- Jean-Luc Issler, Senior Expert and Senior Advisor at CNES Radio Frequency (RF) Directorate
- Ursula Keller, professor at the ETH Zurich
- Francis Leyder, President of the Institute of Professional Representatives before the European Patent Office
- Renata Righetti Pelosi, Managing Partner and President of Italian law firm Bugnion spa
- Jean-Pierre Santos, Head of the Intellectual Property Division of the Business Development Agency of the Government of Monaco.
- Luisa Santos, Director for International Relations at BusinessEurope and a member of the Trade Expert Group of the European Commission.

The 2022 jury was:

- Wolfgang Heckl, Director General of the Deutsches Museum in Munich
- Esben Beck, founder of Stingray Marine Solutions and finalist for the European Inventor Award 2019
- Virna Cerne, Senior Director Research & Development at Dr. Schär, finalist for the European Inventor Award 2016
- Elvira Fortunato, professor at the New University of Lisbon and a Fellow of the Portuguese Engineering Academy and finalist for the European Inventor Award 2016
- Carmen Hijosa, founder and Chief Creative & Innovation Officer at Ananas Anam, winner of the Popular Prize at the European Inventor Award 2021
- Jean-Luc Issler, Senior Expert and Senior Advisor at CNES Radio Frequency (RF) Directorate
- Ursula Keller, professor at ETH Zurich in the Ultrafast Laser Physics research lab
- Richard Palmer, entrepreneur and innovation consultant and former 2019 European Inventor Award finalist
- Bo Pi, Chief Technology Officer at Goodix Technology Inc.; 2021 European Inventor Award finalist
- Carles Puente, co-founder of Ignion and Fractus; 2014 European Inventor Award finalist
- Manfred Stefener, Vice President Fuel Cell Systems at Freudenberg Sealing Technologies and former 2012 European Inventor Award finalist
- Laura van't Veer, Chief Research Officer and the co-founder of Agendia; 2015 European Inventor Award finalist

== See also ==
- List of general science and technology awards
