= List of Kenyan inventions and discoveries =

Kenyan inventions and discoveries are items, techniques or discoveries which owe their existence either partially or entirely to a person born in Kenya, or a citizen of Kenya or to a person abroad of Kenyan heritage.

== Technology and engineering ==
- M-Pesa — mobile phone based money transfer service and microfinancing service, a model adapted by most African countries due to its usage of USSD rather than an individual app — developed by Safaricom and Vodafone
- Smart fingerprint ballot box — biometric ballot box aimed at preventing stray ballots — developed by secondary school students Diana Wambugha and Brian Mwaghogho
- Lion Lights — Automated lighting system to deter predators from livestock — developed by Richard Turere

== Medical and scientific ==
- Kenyaphrynoides vulcan — Kenyan toad species which revealed previously unknown amphibian lineage— Discovered by Dr Patrick Malonza and Dr Victor Wasonga
- Plastic eating larvae — larvae of Kenyan lesser mealworm ("Alphitobius") can degrade polystyrene with the help of specialised gut bacteria — discovered by Dr Fathiya Mbarak Khamis and Evalyne W. Ndotono

== Arts and entertainment ==
- Benga — fast paced music genre characterised by its guitar, bass and percussion usage and traditional African rhythms
