= Arboform =

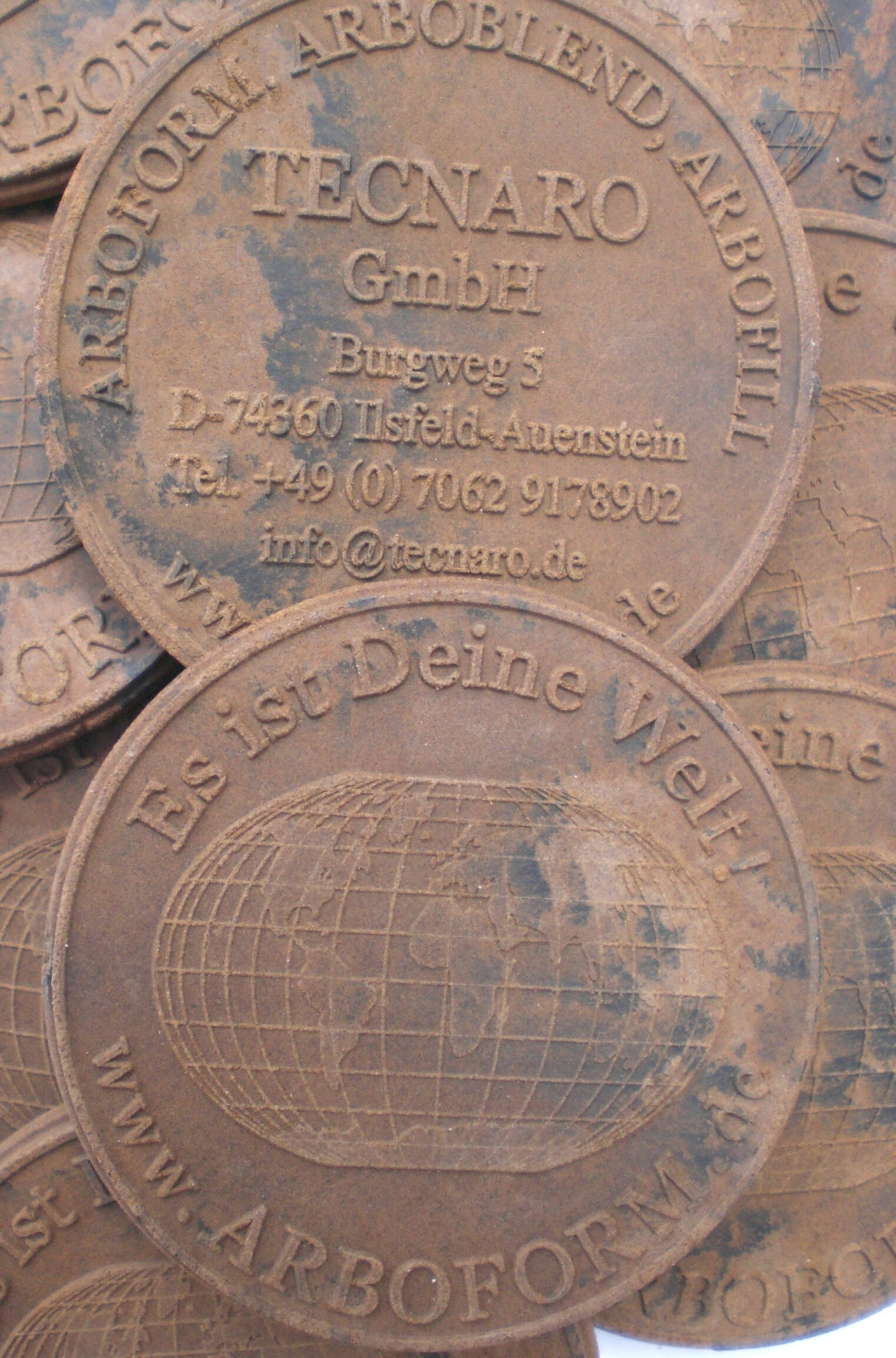
Promotional tokens made of Arboform

Arboform (from Latin: arbor meaning tree) is a trade name for a bioplastic composed of three natural components: lignin, cellulose fibers and some additives. As a thermoplastic, it can be molded and is therefore also called 'liquid wood'.

== History ==
Arboform was developed in 1960 by Helmut Nägele and Jürgen Pfitzer at the Fraunhofer Institute for Chemical Technology. In 1998, they founded a spin-off company Tecnaro, and already in 2002, the company produced about 300 tonnes of Arboform and was selling it at a price of about $9.5/kg. In 2009, Nägele and Pfitzer received the European Inventor Award for their work on Arboform.

== Composition and properties ==
Arboform consists of the two most abundant natural materials: lignin (ca. 30%) and cellulose (ca. 60%). The remaining part is natural additives that function as plasticizers, dyes, antioxidants, fillers, etc. It has a similar composition, appearance and properties to those of wood, but it can be melted upon heating and molded like a thermoplastic. It has been designed to

- contain no synthetic phases
- have mechanical properties similar to those of polyamide
- be thermally stable up to 95 °C
- be moldable at temperatures below 160 °C.

When the amount of cellulose in Arboform is increased from 30 to 60%, its tensile strength increases from 9.5 to 14.5 N/mm^{2} and bending stress increases from ca. 23 to 39 N/mm^{2}, while the indentation hardness and impact strength remain almost constant at ca. 135 N/mm^{2} and 3.2 mJ/mm^{2}, respectively. Other typical properties of Arboform are: thermal conductivity 0.38 W/(m·K), electrical resistivity ~5 GOhm, water content 2–8%.

Comparison of properties of Arboform and common plastics
Property	Arboform	Polyethylene	Polypropylene	Polystyrene
Tension at break (N/mm^{2})	14–22	8–30	30–40	45–65
Modulus of elasticity (in tension, N/mm^{2})	2000–7000	50–500	600–1700	1200–3300
Thermal expansion (10^{−6}/C)	10–50	170–200	100–200	70
Shrinkage upon molding (%)	0.1–0.3	2–3	2–3	1–3

== Synthesis ==
Arboform is typically sold as pea-sized granules of various colors. Their production method differs from those used for synthetic polymers in that it avoids excessive thermal stresses and overheating that can degrade the natural components of Arboform. The granules can then be molded into desired shapes, e.g. a wrist watch frame, using injection molding at temperatures of 150–170 °C. After molding, the material has a density of about 1.4 g/cm^{3}. It can be sawed, burned and disposed of in ways similar to those for wood, i.e. it is a biodegradable material.

== Bibliography ==
- Nägele, H.; et al. (2002). "Arboform® – A Thermoplastic, Processable Material From Lignin and Natural Fibers". In Thomas Q. Hu (ed.). Chemical Modification, Properties, and Usage of Lignin. Springer. pp. 101–117. ISBN 978-0-306-46769-1.
