= Brainstem glioma =

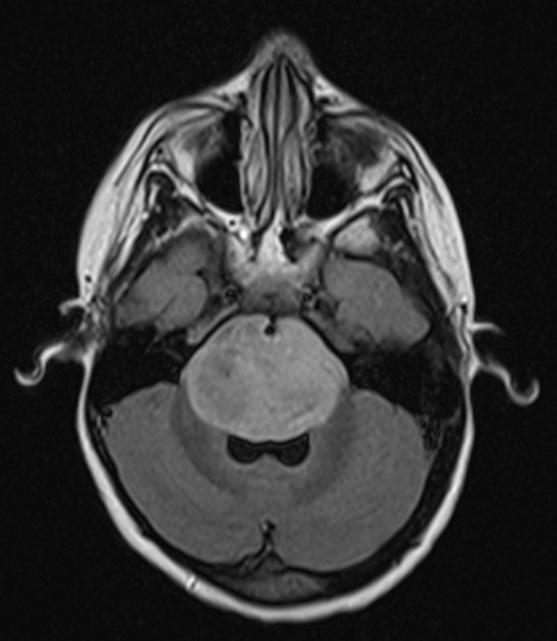
- Brain stem glioma. MRI axial, with contrast
- Specialty: Oncology

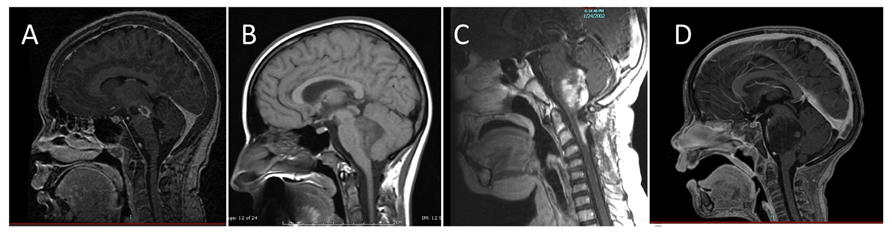
Classification of brainstem gliomas by MRI appearance.

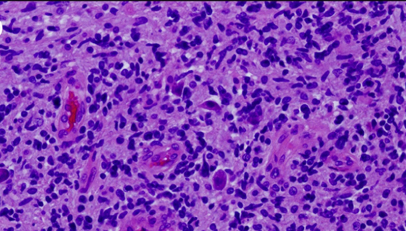
Histopathology of a brainstem glioma.

A brainstem glioma is a cancerous glioma tumor in the brainstem. Around 75% are diagnosed in children and young adults under the age of twenty, but have been known to affect older adults as well. Brainstem gliomas start in the brain or spinal cord tissue and typically spread throughout the nervous system.

== Classification ==
In children, brainsteam gliomas are classified as either diffuse intrinsic pontine gliomas (DIPGs) or as focal brain stem gliomas. The latter type are less aggressive and easier to treat.

== Signs and symptoms ==
Common symptoms include, but are not necessarily limited to:

- Lack of facial control (droopy eyelids)
- Double vision
- Headache or headache that gets better after vomiting
- Nausea and vomiting
- Weakness and fatigue
- Seizures
- Balance problems
- Numbness in face

Symptoms can develop slowly and subtly and may go unnoticed for months. In other cases, the symptoms may arise abruptly. A sudden onset of symptoms tends to occur with more rapidly growing, high-grade tumors.

== Cause ==
The cause is still unknown. Researchers have not found any direct genetic link.

== Diagnosis ==
Neuroimaging, such as MRI, is the main diagnostic tool for brain stem gliomas. In very rare cases, surgery and biopsy are performed.

== Treatment ==
Unlike most brain tumors, brainstem glioma is not often treated with neurosurgery due to complications in vital parts of the brain. More often, it is treated with chemotherapy and/or radiation therapy (though past use of radiation therapy has yielded mixed results).

However, these treatments do produce side effects; most often including nausea, the breakdown of the immune system, and fatigue. Hair loss can occur from both chemotherapy and radiation, but usually grows back after chemotherapy has ceased. Steroids such as Decadron may be required to treat swelling in the brain. Decadron can lead to weight gain and infection. Patients may also experience seizures, which need to be treated to avoid complications. For some patients there is a chance of a neurological breakdown; this can include, but is not limited to, confusion and memory loss.

The use of topotecan has been investigated.

There are several new clinical trials in process. One such trial is dendritic cell immunotherapy which uses the patient's tumor cells and white blood cells to produce a chemotherapy that directly attacks the tumor.

== Prognosis ==
The prognosis for children depends on the tumor type; most children with DIPGs live less than 18 months whereas the survival time for most children with focal gliomas is more than 18 months.

== Research directions ==
- Memorial Sloan Kettering Cancer Center: Our hypothesis is that unravelling the genomic alterations of diffuse infiltrating pontine gliomas or DIPGs will lead to improved understanding of the biology of such tumours and improved therapeutic options.
- National Institutes of Health: DNA Analysis of Tumor Tissue Samples using Paraffin-Embedded Blocks from Patients with Diffuse Pontine Glioma
- St. Jude Children's Research Hospital:Our goal is to perform an extensive genetic analysis of tumor samples obtained from patients with DIPG.
- St. Jude Children's Research Hospital:Gene sequencing project discovers mutations tied to deadly brain tumors in young children
- UCLA's Jonsson Comprehensive Cancer Center:New system uses nanodiamonds to deliver chemotherapy drugs directly to brain tumors
- UT Southwestern Medical Center:Researchers identify a switch that controls growth of most aggressive brain tumor cells
- The Institute of Cancer Research, London:Genetic flaw may hold key to deadly childhood brain tumour
- Patrick Couvreur, Professor and Director of the Physical Chemistry, Pharmacotechnology and Biopharmacy Unit at Paris-Sud University in France:Fighting cancer with nanotechnology
- VU University Medical Center - Amsterdam (the Netherlands): implementation of a multi-institutional diffuse pontine glioma autopsy protocol
