= Adnane =

Adnane is both a surname and a given name. Notable people with the name include:

- Youssef Adnane (born 1985), French footballer
- Adnane Remmal (born 1962), Moroccan biologist
- Adnane Tighadouini (born 1992), Dutch-Moroccan footballer

== See also ==
- Adnan (name)
