= Jens Dall Bentzen =

Danish engineer (born 1968)

Jens Dall Bentzen is a Danish engineer.

Bentzen studied thermodynamics and engineering at the Technical University of Denmark in Copenhagen. He received a master's degree in 1995 on the subject of gasification of biomass. After his master's degree Bentzen worked as a researcher at the Technical University, developing a new gascleaning system for biomass gasification based on baghouse filtration.

Between 1998 and 2007, Bentzen worked for the major Danish consulting company COWI. Bentzen continued to collaborate with the Technical University, about optimizing and upscale of the gasification technology. In 2000 Bentzen filed a patent about the upscale high efficient gasification process. In 2004 there was a license agreement between COWI and a Danish boiler manufacturer. Between 2005 and 2008 was a pilot plant of the gasification process built and tested. Between 2009 and 2013 was a full scale demonstration plant built in Hillerød.

In 2006 Bentzen invented a process that increased efficiency of biomass combustion plants. After negotiations with COWI and potential partners, Bentzen founded Dall Energy in 2007, with seed investment from Spraying Systems, and bought the patent application from COWI. Since 2007 Bentzen has been the managing director of Dall Energy.

Bentzen won the European Inventor Award (SME category) in 2011, and the Bluetech Award in 2017.

== Innovation Awards ==
- 2010 - Innovation Award. Biomass conference in Valladolid, Spain.
- 2011 - European Inventor Award. European Patent Office
- 2011 - Clean tech prize. Danish Environmental Agency.
- 2017 - Bluetech Award. China
