= Helen Lee (researcher) =

French-British medical researcher

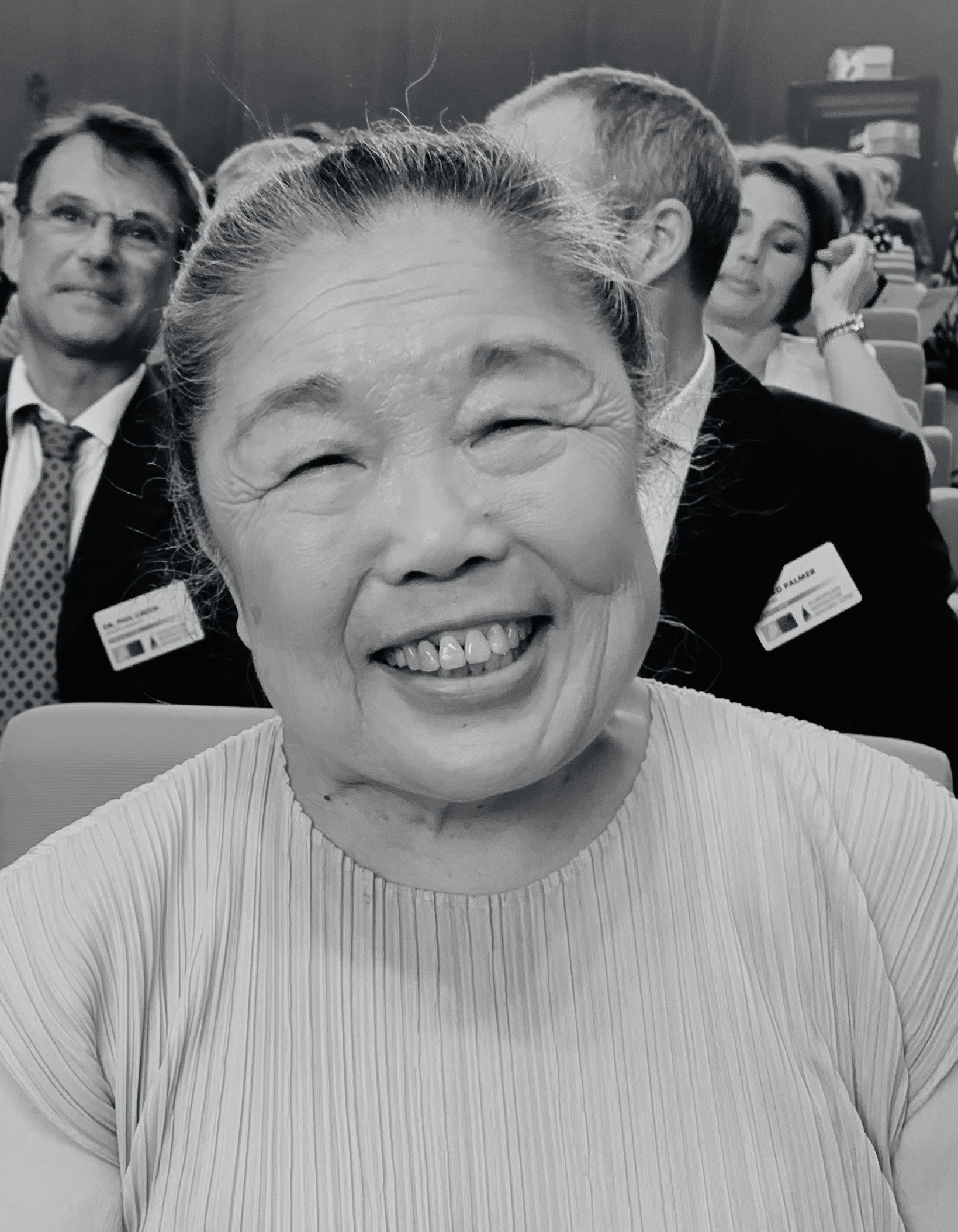
- Education: Cornell University
- Scientific career
- Fields: Diagnostic medicine

Helen Lee is a Chinese-born, British–French medical researcher who won the European Inventor Award 2016 in the Popular Prize category for inventing diagnostic kits for resource-poor regions of the globe. She is the CEO of Diagnostics for the Real World. She has been based at the University of Cambridge since 1996.

== Career ==
Helen Lee received her PhD from Cornell University. She started her career in diagnostics in Paris at the French National Blood Transfusion Centre.

She has been associate professor as the head of the Diagnostics Development Unit at the University of Cambridge, where she developed simple robust HIV tests for developing countries. The diagnostic kit, named "SAMBA" (simple amplification-based assay) was tested in sub-saharan Africa with Médecins Sans Frontières. The product was later spun out from the Diagnostics Development Unit for commercialisation. She is a founder and CEO of Diagnostics for the Real World., a company active in HIV diagnostic devices used particularly in sub-Saharan Africa.

In 2016, she was winner of the European Inventor Award in the Popular Prize category and received more than 36300 votes According to Benoît Battistelli, the president of the European Patent Office, "The overwhelming public vote for Helen Lee recognises her major contribution to the early detection and treatment of infectious diseases in areas most in need."

In 2019, she was appointed as a judge for the European Inventor Award. In May 2020, Lee was recognised on The Times' Science Power List because her invention, the diagnostic kit SAMBA II, is being repurposed for use in COVID-19 testing.

== Prizes and awards ==
- 2005 Lord Lloyd of Kilgerran Award
- 2006 European Women of Achievement Award for her part in improving health care in developing countries
- 2007 Asian Women of Achievement Award
- 2016 European Inventor Award

== Personal life ==
She is married to Jean Pierre Allain who was convicted by French authorities for his part in the haemophilia scandal.
