= Jérôme Galon =

French biologist (born 1967)

- Born: February 6, 1967 (age 59); Besançon, France
- Education: Jussieu University, Paris
- Known for: Work on immunology and cancer
- Awards: Louis-Jeantet Prize (2021), Award from Académie des sciences (2011), Award from Académie de médecine (2011), William B. Coley Award USA (2010)
- Scientific career
- Fields: Immunology, cancer
- Workplaces: Pasteur Institute, Paris; Curie Institute, Paris; National Institute of Health (NIH), USA; INSERM

Jérôme Galon is a French biologist. He is Director of Research of Exceptional Class (DRCE) at Institut National de la Santé et de la Recherche Médicale (INSERM). He is also an entrepreneur and co-founder of HalioDx.

== Education ==
Galon received his Ph.D. degree (Doctorat ès science) with a specialty in immunology in 1996 and did postdoctoral work at the National Institute of Health (NIH), in Bethesda (USA) between 1997 and 2001. Since 2001, he has been working at the Cordeliers Research Center, where he has been the Director of the INSERM Laboratory Integrative Cancer Immunology since 2009.

== Scientific contributions ==
His work aims at a better understanding of the tumor microenvironment and the dynamics of the immune response in human tumors. His laboratory has identified and demonstrated the importance of the immune contexture against cancer. He defined the Immunoscore as a new method for routine clinical assessment of the prognosis of patients with cancer.

== Awards and recognition ==
- NIH Excellence Research Award (1999)
- Prix Shaeverbeke from Fondation de France (2008)
- Prix Rose Lamarca from Fondation pour la recherche médicale (2008)
- William B. Coley Award of the Cancer Research Institute (2010)
- Prix Simone et Cino Del Duca from the French Academy of Sciences Académie des sciences (2011)
- Prix Gallet et Breton from the French Academy of Medicine Académie de médecine (2011)
- European Inventor Award (2019)
- Team Science Award from the Society for immunotherapy of cancer (SITC, USA) (2020)
- Fondazione Melanoma Award (Italy) (2020)
- Jean Valade Award (Senior Medical Prize from Fondation de France) (2020)
- Louis-Jeantet Prize (Switzerland) (2021)
- Galien Prize (2021)
- Duquesne Prize, from La Ligue contre le Cancer (2022)
- Jérôme Galon was decorated as Knight of the Legion of Honor for exceptional INSERM career (2020)
