= Masako Yudasaka =

Japanese materials scientist

- Education: Tokyo Metropolitan University
- Occupation: Materials Scientist
- Notable work: Carbon nanotubes and for developing a sustainable process to produce them.

Masako Yudasaka is a Japanese materials scientist known for her research on nanocarbon materials, including carbon nanotubes. She is a senior researcher at the National Institute of Advanced Industrial Science and Technology (AIST), where her work spans materials science, biomedical engineering, and nanotechnology. Yudasaka has contributed to advances in the synthesis and application of carbon-based nanomaterials and has collaborated on research recognized within the field of micro‑ and nanotechnology. She earned her doctorate from Tokyo Metropolitan University. In 2015 she was a winner of the European Inventor Award.
