= Wolfgang M. Heckl =

German biophysicist and science communicator (born 1958)

- Wolfgang M. Heckl
- Born: Wolfgang Martin Heckl; 10 September 1958 (age 68); Parsberg, Upper Palatinate, West Germany
- Education: Technical University of Munich (Dr. rer. nat., 1988); LMU Munich (habilitation, 1993)
- Known for: Scanning probe microscopy; Director General of the Deutsches Museum (2004–2025)
- Awards: Philip Morris Research Prize (1993); Communicator Prize (2002); Descartes Prize for Science Communication (2004); Order of Merit of the Federal Republic of Germany
- Scientific career
- Fields: Biophysics, experimental physics, nanoscience, science communication
- Workplaces: LMU Munich; Technical University of Munich; Deutsches Museum

Wolfgang Martin Heckl (born 10 September 1958 in Parsberg, Upper Palatinate) is a German biophysicist, experimental physicist and science administrator. His research has focused on nanoscience, scanning probe microscopy and science communication. From 2004 to 2025 he was Director General of the Deutsches Museum in Munich, and from 2009 to 2025 he held the Oskar von Miller Chair of Science Communication at the Technical University of Munich.

== Life and career ==
After completing his Abitur with a grade average of 1.0 (the best possible grade; his total score would arithmetically correspond to a theoretical average of 0.8) at the Ostendorfer-Gymnasium in Neumarkt in der Oberpfalz, Heckl studied physics at the Technical University of Munich from 1978 to 1985. In 1988 he obtained his doctorate (Dr. rer. nat.) at the Institute of Biophysics in Munich with a thesis on the lateral organisation of lipid monolayers under the influence of amphiphilic foreign substances and proteins. He then worked as a postdoctoral researcher at the University of Toronto and in the IBM research group of Gerd Binnig. In 1993 he completed his habilitation in physics at LMU Munich with a thesis on scanning tunneling microscopy of two-dimensional crystals of organic molecules, and subsequently accepted a professorship at LMU.

In the same year Heckl received the Philip Morris Research Prize for his work on the structural elucidation of the DNA bases, and was entered in the Guinness Book of Records for writing an atomic bit, under the title "the world's smallest hole".

Heckl is a full member of the Center for NanoScience (CeNS) and the GeoBio-Center of LMU Munich, of the Nanosystems Initiative Munich (NIM), and of the German Academy of Science and Engineering (acatech), among other organisations. He has served on numerous bodies, including as chairman of the board of trustees of the Max Planck Institute of Quantum Optics, as a jury member for the German Future Prize and the German Environmental Prize, and as a board member of the Eduard Rhein Foundation. He has also advised the European Commission and the German federal government on nanotechnology.

In 2004 Heckl became Director General of the Deutsches Museum. He was responsible for the museum's difficult modernisation and for its ambitious plans to expand to Nuremberg. He was criticised for the costly measures at the museum's transport centre (Verkehrszentrum) on the Theresienhöhe. In 2009 he accepted an appointment to the Oskar von Miller Chair of Science Communication at the Technical University of Munich (School of Education / Physics Department). Heckl retired at the end of May 2025 after more than 20 years as Director General, longer than any of his predecessors; he was succeeded on 1 June 2025 by the physicist Michael Decker, who also took over the TUM chair.

In December 2025 the Technical University of Munich conferred on Heckl the honorary title TUM Emeritus of Excellence, making him a member of the TUM Senior Excellence Faculty.

Heckl also chairs the international jury of the European Inventor Award of the European Patent Office.

Heckl is married to the lawyer Sigrid Schütz-Heckl; they have one daughter.

== Public engagement ==
From 2007 to 2018 Heckl was a regular guest on the Bavarian Television programme Der Sonntags-Stammtisch. He writes the column Hier schreibt Heckl ("Heckl writes here") for P.M. Magazin.

In August 2013 he published the book Die Kultur der Reparatur ("The Culture of Repair"), in which he promotes repair as a way out of obsolescence and the throwaway society. In an interview he said that he meets regularly with the astronaut Ulrich Walter to repair old television sets. He opened a repair café in Farchant.

In an interview with the radio station WDR 3 in October 2026, Heckl explained why he regards repair as a cultural practice: for thousands of years repair had been an integral part of human life, not least because material goods were scarce and valuable; moreover, it was a general principle of nature, since life could neither have arisen nor persisted without molecular repair mechanisms, and humans should carry this principle over into technological society. He noted that his 2013 book had listed about 80 repair cafés in Germany, whereas there are now more than 1,000, and described them as social places for exchanging ideas about how people want to live in the future.

== Art ==
Heckl is also active as an artist. Under the title Science & Art he translates scientific phenomena into artistic forms, ranging from images of the nanoworld and paintings inspired by molecular structures to works that use AI algorithms he developed himself to translate images into music and music into images. In 2026 his work was shown in the exhibition Science & Art. Von der Molekularkunst zur KI-Kunst at the Palais Niederösterreich in Vienna.

His research on atoms and molecules serves as inspiration for his painting; he describes his own visual language as Molekülismus ("molecularism"). As early as 2002, in the project Atomare Klangwelten ("Atomic Soundscapes"), he developed a method for translating scanning tunnelling microscope images of atoms and molecules into sound. In 2021, together with K. Wienand, he published a study on translating images into melodies using artificial intelligence (variational autoencoders).

Heckl is a member of the Kunstgilde Parsberg, an artists' guild in his home town, and is listed in the Werdenfelser Künstlerlexikon.

=== Selected solo exhibitions ===
- 2012: Moleküle in der Landschaft ("Molecules in the Landscape"), Studio La Cave, Munich
- 2018: Walchensee Museum, Urfeld am Walchensee
- 2018: Molekülismus, Neumarkt in der Oberpfalz (13–21 August)
- 2018: Barockschlössl Mistelbach, Lower Austria (24–26 August), marking the 35th anniversary of the town partnership between Neumarkt and Mistelbach
- 2018: Science & Art, Hans Eisenmann Centre, Weihenstephan Science Centre (13–20 October), on the occasion of the 150th anniversary of the Technical University of Munich
- 2024: Science & Art, Mohr-Villa, Munich-Freimann (26 April – 18 May)
- 2026: Science & Art. Von der Molekularkunst zur KI-Kunst, Palais Niederösterreich, Vienna (17 July – 19 August)

== Awards and honours ==
For his efforts to communicate scientific results to the public, Heckl received the Communicator Prize of the Stifterverband für die Deutsche Wissenschaft in 2002, and in 2004 the Descartes Prize of the European Commission in the category "Professional scientists engaged in science communication to the public".

- 1993: Philip Morris Research Prize
- 2008: Cross of Merit on Ribbon of the Order of Merit of the Federal Republic of Germany
- 2015: Ring of Honour of the Eduard Rhein Foundation
- 2020: Arthur Burkhardt Prize
- 2024: Officer's Cross (Cross of Merit, 1st Class) of the Order of Merit of the Federal Republic of Germany
- 2025: Pro meritis scientiae et litterarum of the Bavarian State Ministry of Science and the Arts

== Selected publications ==
- More than 350 articles in scientific journals
- Laterale Organisation von Lipidmonoschichten bei Einbau von amphiphilen Fremdstoffen und Proteinen [Lateral organisation of lipid monolayers upon incorporation of amphiphilic foreign substances and proteins]. Doctoral thesis, Technical University of Munich, 1988. DNB 890893977.
- Rastertunnelmikroskopie an zweidimensionalen Kristallen aus organischen Molekülen [Scanning tunnelling microscopy of two-dimensional crystals of organic molecules]. Habilitation thesis, LMU Munich, 1993.
- Die Kultur der Reparatur [The Culture of Repair]. Carl Hanser Verlag, Munich 2013, ISBN 978-3-446-43678-7.
- Wissenschaftskommunikation [Science Communication]. Springer, Berlin/Heidelberg 2015, ISBN 978-3-662-47842-4.
- Die Welt der Technik in 100 Objekten [The World of Technology in 100 Objects]. C.H. Beck, Munich 2022, ISBN 978-3-406-78314-2.
