= Laura J. van 't Veer =

Laura Johanna van 't Veer
- Born: 2 March 1957 (age 69)
- Education: University of Amsterdam B.Sc. in biology and M.Sc. in molecular oncology University of Leiden Ph.D.
- Awards: IARC Medal of Honor (2005); ESMO Lifetime Achievement Award for Translational Research in Breast Cancer (2007); Breast Cancer Research Fund (BCRF-Pink Ribbon US) grant award (2007) (2008); European Inventor Award (2015)
- Scientific career
- Fields: Clinical medicine
- Workplaces: Netherlands Cancer Institute; Agendia BV; University of California, San Francisco
- Thesis: (1989)

Laura Johanna van 't Veer (born 1957) is a Dutch molecular biologist and clinical molecular geneticist. She is group leader molecular pathology for the Department of Pathology and Division of Experimental Therapy of The Netherlands Cancer Institute. van't Veer is now Leader of the Breast Oncology Program and Associate Director Applied Genomics at the HDFCCC. She is also the founder of the company Agendia, which provides a genomic test that analyzes 70 specific genomes within a tumor to assess the risk of breast cancer.

== Education ==
Ever since high school van't Veer has always had an interest in biology. Her high school biology teacher, who was doing research at the University of Amsterdam, brought university level education to her which acted as a pivotal moment to her education. At the age of 14, van't Veer found a keen interest in genes. These parts of her youth led van't Veer to pursue a career in medical research.

She attended the University of Amsterdam from 1976 to 1984 and received a B.Sc. in biology and M.Sc. in molecular oncology. According to van't Veer, her "entire undergraduate schooling was dedicated to biology". She continued her studies at the University of Leiden from 1984 to 1989. She would earn her PhD focusing on the study of oncogene activation and tumorigenesis. van't Veer was specifically researching why ovarian cells become malignant.

== Career ==
In 2003, van 't Veer cofounded Agendia B.V. in 2003, serving as the chief operating officer of Agendia B.V. until June 12, 2007. In this company, she contributed her invention, MammaPrint. The New England Journal of Medicine published a trial on the MINDACT that 46% of clinically high-risk breast cancer patients can safely avoid chemotherapy treatment according to the low-risk MammaPrint test result. She continues her work with the company today as chief research officer. She was featured in the cover story of the May–June 2006 issue of Cancer World. With her colleagues in the field, she has been awarded a number of patents related to cancer treatment. She has been a member of the Science Policy and Government Affairs Committee of the American Association for Cancer Research since 2014. From 2013 to 2014, she was a member of the Education and Training Committee. She has more than 80 peer reviewed publications to her name.

van't Veer's research focuses on personalized medicine by analyzing the specific genetic makeup of both the individual tumors and patients. The result of this individualization is the opportunity for physicians to treat their patients with the most effective selection of therapy.

van 't Veer's MammaPrint is a software technology that assesses a cancer patient's risk of recurrence of breast cancer to better triage the need for costly and straining chemotherapy treatment. MammaPrint led van't Veer to win the 2015 European Inventors Award.The societal benefit is reducing the exposure of chemotherapy to patients that do not need it. Agendia was ranked in 2015 as one of the "world’s 14 leading molecular diagnostics firms by revenue."

== Awards and merits ==
- IARC Medal of Honor, Lyon, France in 2005
- Van der Scheuren award lecture for European Breast Cancer Research, EBCC5 in 2006.
- ESMO Lifetime Achievement Award for Translational Research in Breast Cancer in 2007
- Breast Cancer Research Fund (BCRF-Pink Ribbon US) grant award in 2007 and 2008
- Delivered the First Annual Harry and Edith Gladstein Award, Indiana University, School of Medicine on April 7, 2009, titled "Molecular Profiles of Breast and Colorectal Cancer in Patient Management"
- European Inventor Award, in 2015 for her gene-based breast cancer test.
- Giants of Cancer Care Award in 2020 for cancer diagnostics
