= Julius Blum =

Austrian manufacturer of furniture

Blum GmbH
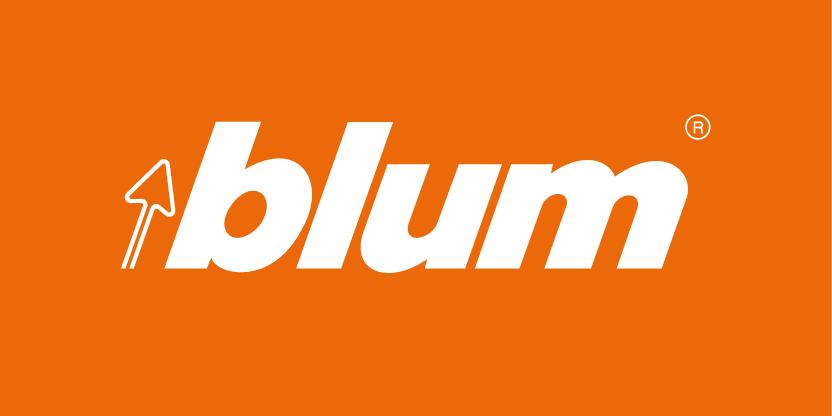
- Type: GmbH
- Industry: Metalworking
- Founded: 1952
- Founder: Julius Blum
- Headquarters: Höchst
- Area served: Worldwide
- Key people: Philipp Blum (General Manager); Martin Blum (General Manager); Gerhard Humpeler (Head of Finance)
- Products: Furniture fittings
- Revenue: €1.887B (2018/2019)
- Number of employees: 7,983 (06/2019)
- Website: www.blum.com

Julius Blum GmbH (commonly referred to as Blum) is an international company that produces hinge-, lift- and runner-systems and the appropriate assembly tools for the cabinet making and furniture industry.

== Description ==
Blum is an international manufacturer of furniture hardware. It is a family-owned company based in Höchst, a municipality in the Austrian province of Vorarlberg. Production facilities are mainly located in Austria, but the company also has production plants in the United States, in Poland and in Brazil. Blum supplies furniture manufacturers and hardware distributors in more than 120 countries worldwide. 97% of its products are exported, and its annual turnover was €1.887 billion in 2018/2019.

As of 30 June 2019 the company had 7,983 employees. In Vorarlberg, the company is one of the largest employers, with eight factories and more than 6,600 employees.

== History ==
The company was founded in 1952 by blacksmith Julius Blum in Höchst.

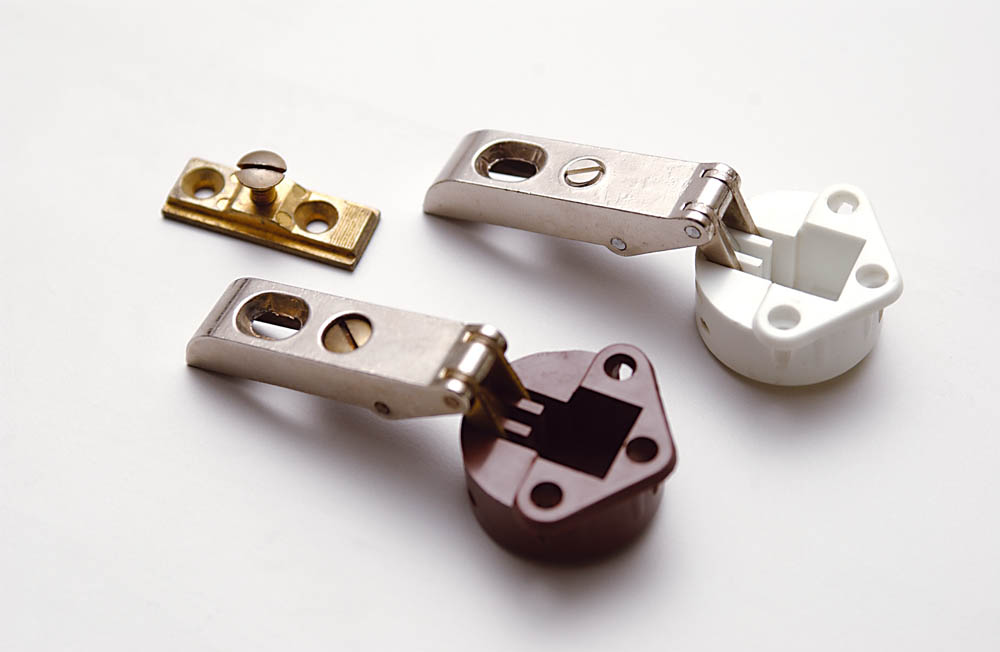
First concealed hinge

The first product was a horseshoe stud, which prevents horses from slipping. Then in 1958, the first furniture hinge was produced. The construction of concealed hinges started in 1964, and this essentially led to the entry into the furniture fittings industry. Today, Blum products are exported to more than 120 countries.

Julius Blum died in 2006, and the family business continued to be run by his sons, Gerhard Blum and Herbert Blum. Today, the company structure is as follows: Gerhard E. Blum (26%), Herbert Blum (26%), and Blum Private Trust (48%). Since 30 June 2019 the third generation has taken the helm of the family-owned company, and Gerhard E. Blum will now focus on the Blum Group Holding.

== Production facilities and subsidiaries ==
The company has seven factories in Vorarlberg, and additional production sites are situated in Poland, Brazil and the United States. In the 2017/18 financial year, 48% of the company’s turnover was generated in the EU, 15% in the United States and 37% in other markets than Austria.

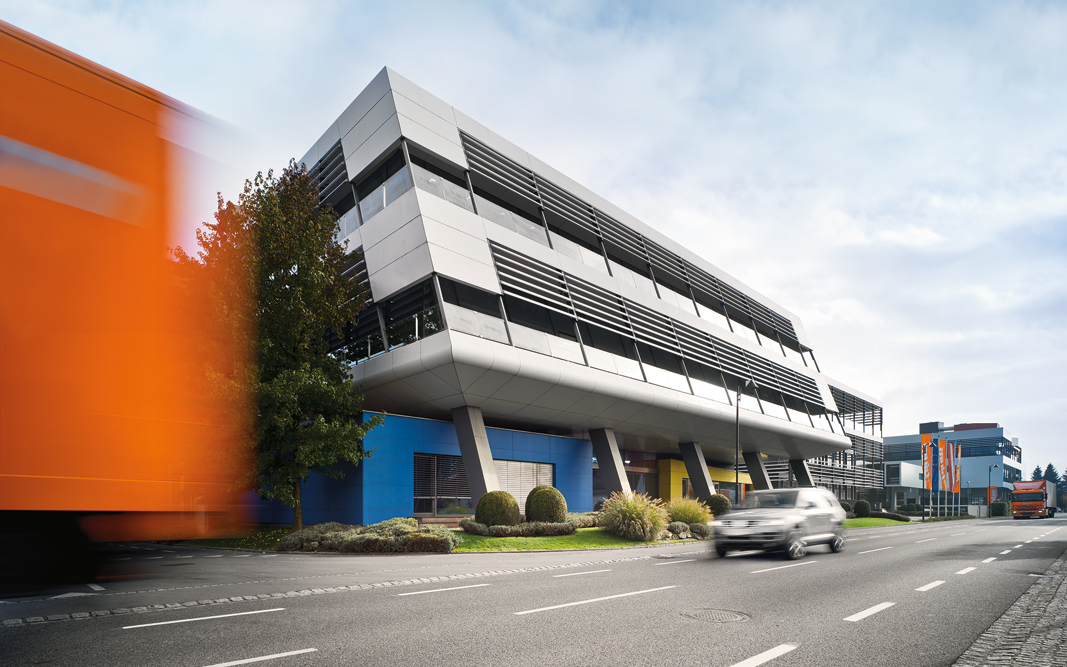
One of seven factories in Vorarlberg, Austria

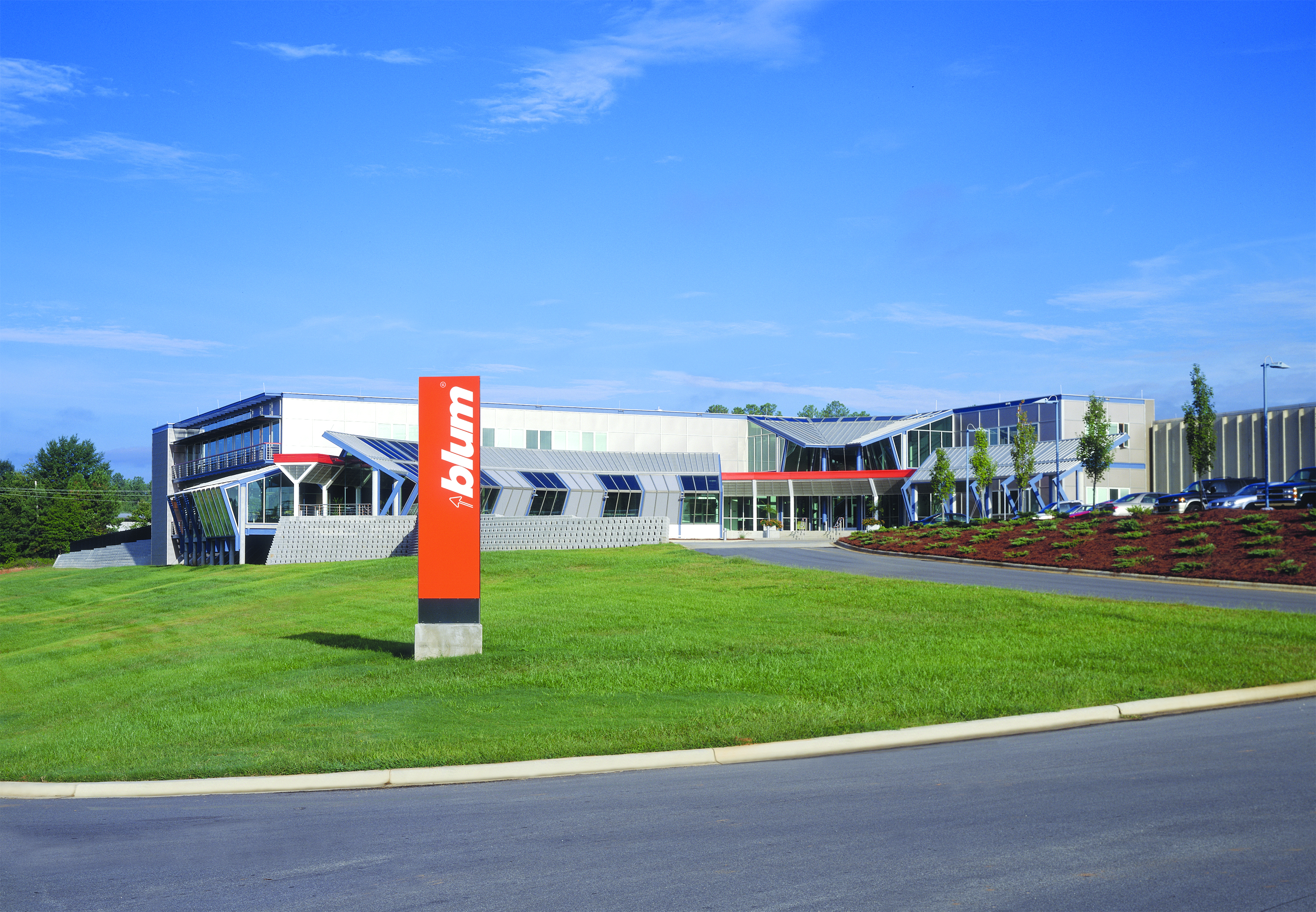
Factory in North Carolina, US

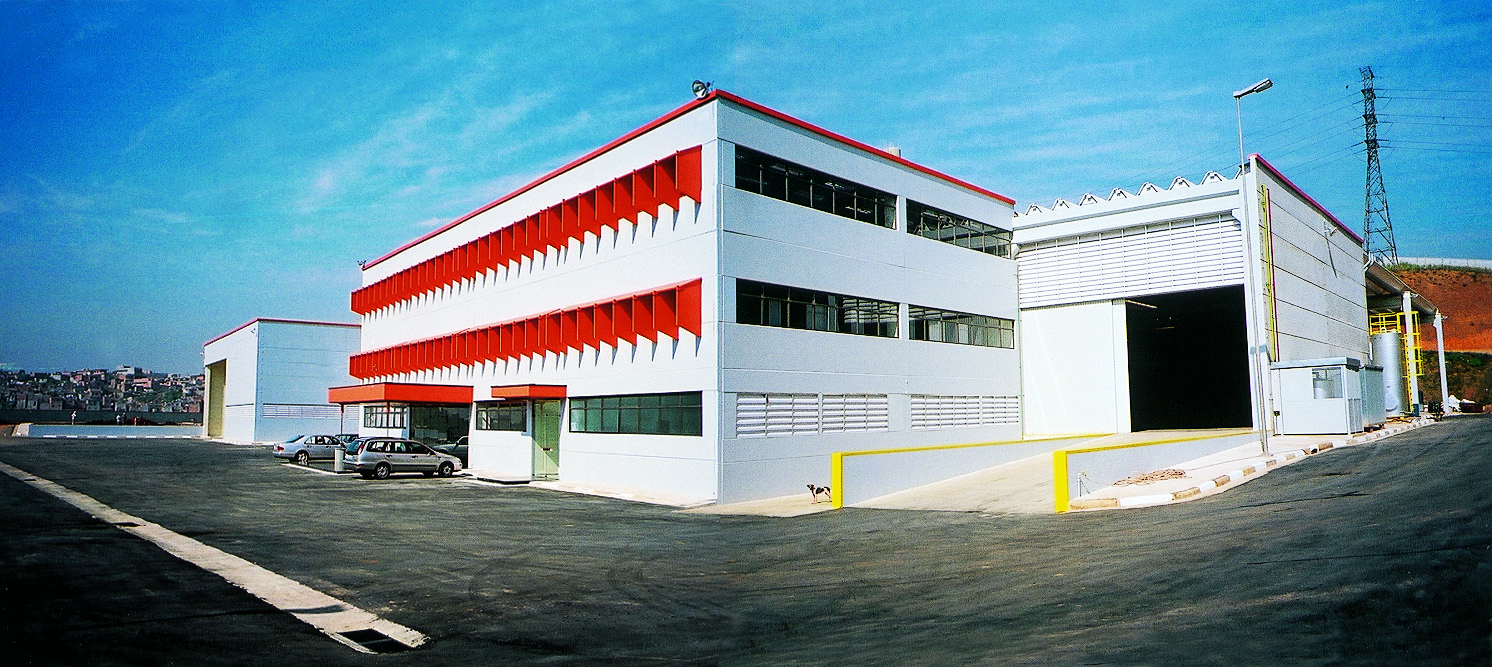
Factory in São Paulo, Brazil

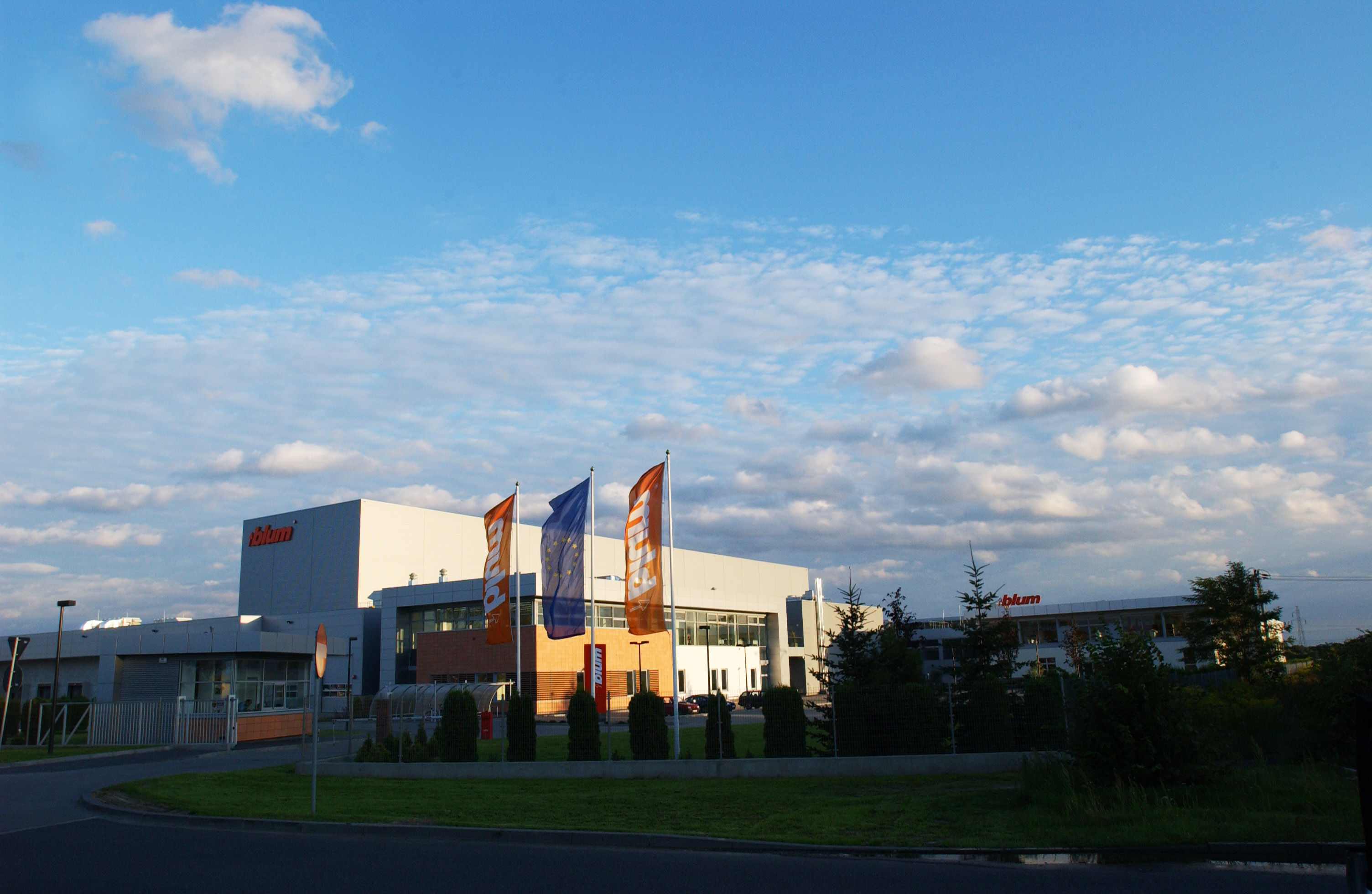
Factory in Jasin nearby Swarzędz, Poland

The company has 31 subsidiaries worldwide.

Blum subsidiaries (ranked according to the founding year):

- 1977: Blum Sweden, Blum USA
- 1978: Blum Canada
- 1981: Blum Germany
- 1987: Blum UK
- 1989: Blum Norway
- 1991: Blum France
- 1992: Blum Poland
- 1993: Blum Czech Republic
- 1994: Blum Hungary
- 1995: Blum Romania
- 1996: Blum Turkey
- 1997: Blum Australia
- 1998: Blum Brazil
- 2001: Blum South East Asia
- 2002: Blum China
- 2005: Blum Ukraine
- 2006: Blum Hong Kong
- 2007: Blum Mexico
- 2008: Blum Kazakhstan, Blum Vietnam
- 2009: Blum India
- 2010: Blum New Zealand
- 2011: Blum North Africa, Blum Portugal
- 2012: Blum Greece
- 2016: Blum Azerbaijan, Blum Switzerland
- 2017: Blum Slovakia
- 2018: Blum Indonesia

== Products ==
Blum is specialized in the production of fittings and systems for furniture, in particular for kitchens. The main business segments are lift, hinge and pull-out systems. Blum products are displayed at showrooms, home design shows and fairs for the furniture industry, such as Interzum in Cologne, and Kitchen & Bath Industry Show (KBIS).

== Research ==
Blum invests 4% of its annual revenue in research and development. In 2014, the company held around 67 patents and 2,100 trademark rights in total. Blum Austria occupies second place in the invention rankings and ranks amongst Austria’s top ten patent candidates.

The company has set up training rooms, laboratory kitchens and test-drive areas to identify requirements of kitchen fitters, manufacturers, sellers and kitchen buyers. Research insights have resulted in new and improved products and concepts for storage space planning in kitchens.

Blum has won several awards in product quality and design. In 2013, the furniture manufacturer received the European Inventor Award in the industry category for its hinge system Blumotion. The invention assures that doors, drawers and lift systems close gently and silently.

== Apprenticeship training ==
Blum Austria started its own apprenticeship system in 1970. The four-year program is a combination of class participation and practical training in the company. Students are able to learn high-tech professions in metal and plastics processing. Vocational training is common within central Europe, as young people are split at the age of 15 either to academic schools or to apprenticeships.

Eight training programs are currently offered:

- Mechanical engineering
- Toolmaking
- CNC Technician
- Plastics engineering
- Mechatronics
- Design engineering
- Electrical engineering
- Production engineering
- Materials engineering
- Production Measurement Technology

In 1995, Blum USA introduced the in-house training program "Apprenticeship 2000" according to the Austrian model. The company cooperates with businesses in the community and the Central Piedmont Community College (CPCC).

As of September 2019, the company had trained 363 apprentices, 21 of which were in the United States. Blum apprentices frequently take part in global competitions like WorldSkills, in which they have received several certificates of excellence.

Blum is actively involved in a variety of initiatives with educational and training organisations, such as the Buckinghamshire New University Foundation Course for kitchen designers.

== Environment ==
Blum started to install energy management systems as early as 20 years ago. The company has been certified to several international standards, including ISO 14001, ISO 9001 and ISO 50001.
