= Elena García Armada =

Spanish engineer (born 1971)

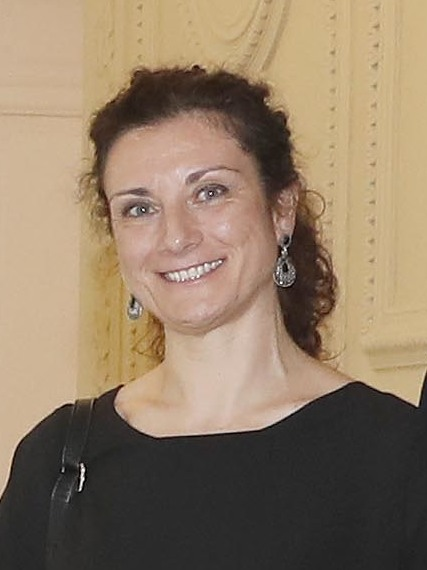
- Elena García Armada in 2018
- Born: 1971; Valladolid, Spain
- Education: Technical University of Madrid
- Occupations: Engineer, roboticist
- Website: https://car.upm-csic.es/author/?id=7402249975

Elena Garcia Armada (b. 1971 Valladolid, Spain) is a Spanish researcher, roboticist, business founder and industrial engineer who leads the CSIC group at the Center for Automation and Robotics, (CAR) CSIC-UPM that has developed the first bionic exoskeleton for children with spinal muscular atrophy, for which she received the European Inventor Award Popular Prize in 2022.

== Early life and education ==
Elena Garcia Armada was born in Valladolid, Spain in 1971. She received a doctorate in robotic engineering in 2002 from the Polytechnic University of Madrid by her work “Optimizing the speed and stability of legged robots in natural environments”. She began a career in industry-orientated robotics at the Center for Automation and Robotics, (CAR) CSIC-UPM, as a postdoctoral research fellow. She completed her training at the Leg Laboratory of the Massachusetts Institute of Technology.

== Daniela ==
In 2009, Garcia met Daniela, a six-year-old girl who had become tetraplegic as a result of a traffic accident. Garcia became determined to engineer paediatric robotic exoskeletons, which were not available in medicine at the time. The goal of these exoskeletons was to provide gait assistance to contribute to the rehabilitation of injured children or children suffering from degenerative neuromuscular diseases.

== Career ==
Garcia continues to work for CAR as a Tenured senior scientist within the Centre for Automation and Robotics (CSIC-UPM). She leads her own research group creating artificial legs and quadrupeds developing versatile artificial muscles. The aim of the groups research is to improve the performance of legged robots, including, active compliance in foot-ground interaction, developing new actuators, improving dynamic stability, and designing and controlling agile quadrupeds and lower-limb exoskeletons for mobility aid.

Garcia cofounded Marsi Bionics in 2013 as a spin-off of CAR. It builds adjustable paediatric exoskeletons that incorporate small motors to mimic muscle movements and provide the person with the strength to walk.

During her Career, Garcia has published 80 international scientific articles and one book on legged locomotion. Additionally, Garcia is a member of the editorial board of the IEEE International Conference on Robotics and Automation.

== Awards and honors ==
- In 2020, Robohub (an online communication platform about robotics) considered Garcia as one of the "30 women in robotics you need to know about".
- In 2021, she received the Community of Madrid "Fermina Orduña" Technological Innovation Award, and an Honorable Mention as Industrial Engineer of the Year from Colegio de Ingenieros Industriales de Madrid (COIIM).
- In 2022, she received the Red Cross Gold Medal, a Special Mention in the I UICM Professional Woman Awards and the Business Insiders "Better Capitalism Top Insiders 2022" Award. In June 2022 she received the European Inventor Award Popular Prize, awarded by the European Patent Office (EPO), for her paediatric exoskeleton design.
- In February 2023, Garcia was named Doctor honoris causa by Miguel de Cervantes European University, in Valladolid.
- In March 2023, she received a "Premio Nacional de Discapacidad Reina Letizia" Research and Innovation Award from Government of Spain Ministry of Social Affairs (Spain) and the Community of Madrid acknowledged Garcia with a Technology Award in "Reconocimientos 8 de Marzo a mujeres destacadas por su talento y liderazgo".
- In July 2022, the Spanish Federation of Executive, Professional and Managerial Women (FEDEPE) acknowledged Garcia with the Leadership Professional Woman Award.
- In September 2026, the Council of Ministers appointed her Commander by Number of the Civil Order of Alfonso X, the Wise.

== Research and publications ==
=== Books ===
- García Armada, Elena (2022). Los Robots y sus capacidades (in Spanish). Los Libros de la Catarata: Madrid : Editorial CSIC Consejo Superior de Investigaciones Científicas. p. 140. ISBN 978-84-1352-394-1.
- García Armada, Elena (2015). Robots (in Spanish). Los Libros de la Catarata: Madrid : Editorial CSIC Consejo Superior de Investigaciones Científicas. p. 94. ISBN 978-84-00-09914-5.
- Gonzalez de Santos, Pablo; Garcia, Elena; Estremera, Joaquin (2006). Quadrupedal Locomotion. Springer-Verlag London Limited. p. 277. ISBN 978-1-84628-307-9.

=== Research articles ===
- Garcia Armada, E (February 2009). "Robots que caminan". Investigación y Ciencia (389): 8–9.
- Garcia, E; González de Santos, P (2001). "Soft computing techniques for improving foot trajectories in walking machines". Journal of Robotic Systems. 18: 343–356. doi:10.1002/rob.1028. hdl:10261/7888.
- Garcia Armada, E; González de Santos, P; Canudas de Wit, C (2002). "Velocity dependence in the cyclic friction arising with gears". The International Journal of Robotics Research. 21 (9): 761–771. doi:10.1177/0278364902021009877. hdl:10261/7864. S2CID 1411236.
- Garcia Armada, E; Estremera, J; Gonzalez de Santos, P (2002). "A comparative study on stability margins for walking machines". Robotica. 20 (6): 595–606. doi:10.1017/S0263574702004502. hdl:10261/8219. S2CID 28590143.
- Garcia Armada, E; Galvez, J.A.; Gonzalez de Santos, P (2003). "On finding the relevant dynamics for model based controlling walking robots". Journal of Intelligent and Robotic Systems. 37 (4): 375–398. doi:10.1023/A:1026104815610. hdl:10261/8232. S2CID 32158349.
- Garcia Armada, E; González de Santos, P (2004). "Mobile Robot Navigation with Complete Coverage of Unstructured Environments". Robotics and Autonomous Systems. 46 (4): 195–204. doi:10.1016/j.robot.2004.02.005. hdl:10261/12814.
- Garcia Armada, E; González de Santos, P (2005). "An improved energy stability margin for walking machines subject to dynamic effects". Robotica. 23 (1): 13–20. doi:10.1017/S0263574704000487. hdl:10261/8135. S2CID 6669366.
- Garcia Armada, E; González de Santos, P (2006). "On the Improvement of Walking Performance in Natural Environments by a Compliant Adaptive Gait". IEEE Transactions on Robotics. 22 (6): 1240–1253. doi:10.1109/TRO.2006.884343. hdl:10261/7869. S2CID 1629387.
- Garcia Armada, E; Jiménez, M.A.; Gonzalez de Santos, P; Armada, M.A. (2007). "The Evolution of Robotics Research from Industrial Robotics to Field and Service Robotics". IEEE Robotics and Automation Magazine. 14 (1): 90–103. doi:10.1109/MRA.2007.339608. S2CID 16854708.
- Garcia Armada, E; González de Santos, P; Matia, F (2008). "Dealing with Internal and External Perturbations on Walking Robots". Autonomous Robots. 24 (3): 213–227. doi:10.1007/s10514-007-9079-y. S2CID 36269354.
- Garcia Armada, E; Arevalo, J.C.; Muñoz, G; Gonzalez de Santos, P (2011). "Combining series-elastic actuation and magneto-rheological damping for the control of agile locomotion". Robotics and Autonomous Systems. 59 (10): 827–839. doi:10.1016/j.robot.2011.06.006.
- Garcia Armada, E; Arevalo, J.C.; Muñoz, G; Gonzalez de Santos, P (2011). "On the Biomimetic Design of Agile-Robot Legs". Sensors. 11 (12): 11305–11334. Bibcode:2011Senso..1111305G. doi:10.3390/s111211305. PMC 3251984. PMID 22247667.
- Garcia Armada, E; González de Santos, P (2013). "Modular and versatile platform for the benchmarking of modern actuators for robots". Smart Structures and Systems. 11 (2): 135–161. doi:10.12989/sss.2013.11.2.135.
- Garcia Armada, E; Arevalo, J; Cestari, M; Sanz-Merodio, D (2015). "On the technological instantiation of a biomimetic leg concept for agile locomotion". ASME Journal of Mechanisms and Robotics. 7 (3).
- Sanz-Merodio, D; Puyuelo, G; Ganguly, A; Garces, E; Goñi, A; Garcia, E (2020). "EXOtrainer Project Clinical Evaluation of Gait Training with Exoskeleton in Children with Spinal Muscular Atrophy". Advances in Robotics Research: From Lab to Market. Springer Tracts in Advanced Robotics. Vol. 132. pp. 211–227. doi:10.1007/978-3-030-22327-4_10. hdl:10261/226193. ISBN 978-3-030-22326-7.
