= Elmar Mock =

Swiss engineer and inventor

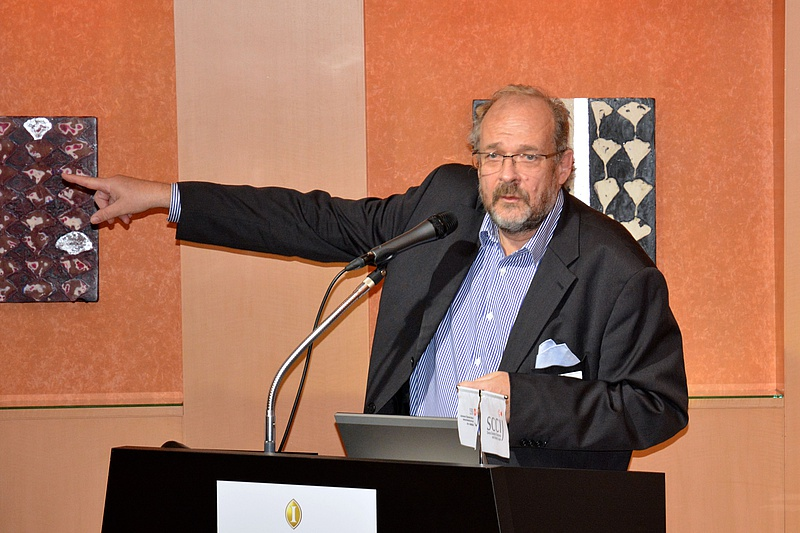
- Born: 1954 (age 71–72); La Chaux-de-Fonds, Switzerland
- Occupation: engineer
- Known for: SWATCH watch

Elmar Mock (born February 2, 1954, in La Chaux-de-Fonds) is a Swiss watch engineer with specialized knowledge in polymers, an industrial designer, and inventor.

== Biography ==
=== Education ===
Elmar Mock graduated from the Technical School of Biel in 1976. He was hired by ETA Manufacture Horlogère (ETA SA). He completed a one-year training course in synthetic materials in Aargau, financed by his employer, on condition that he returned to work for two years at ETA SA.

=== Personal life ===
Spouse(s): Mary-Claude Juillerat (m.1975-1997.) Children: Sébastien Mock, Vincent Mock, Stéphanie Corthay, and Réanne Mock. Hélène Kett (m.2003). Stepchildren: Charles-Henry, Anne-Sophie and Isabeau Dubey. Elmar resides with his wife in Altdorf, Uri, Switzerland and in Ballater, Aberdeenshire, Scotland.

=== Inventor and industrial designer ===
Elmar Mock is, with Jacques Müller, the co-inventor of the SWATCH watch, under the direction of Ernst Thomke, at the beginning of the 1980s, invention which revolutionized the Swiss watch industry, which at the time was seriously losing ground to the Japanese quartz watch competition – quartz watches which were low cost and reliable. Mock and Müller came up with the idea of using plastic materials to produce watches. The classic Swiss watch required 91 parts - the SWATCH has only 51. The movement is integrated in the watch-case; the watch strap is made of polyurethane; everything is assembled in one block; and the ultrasonic welding technique, developed by Mock, welds the PMMA (plexiglass) crystal to the watchcase, making it resistant and waterproof—but also irreparable. In its first year 500,000 watches were sold for a price between 39.90 and 49.90 Swiss Francs, with a production cost of 5 Swiss Francs. As at 2018, more than 700 million SWATCH watches have been sold worldwide. Mock then worked on the ROCKWATCH watch (for Tissot), which has the distinctive attribute of having a watchface made of granite from the Swiss Alps.

Mock then left watchmaking and founded his own engineering company in innovation/creativity and product development, called Createc in 1986, in Biel. This company later became Creaholic. As at 2018, the company employs 55 people. Swisscom holds a 5% stake in Creaholic. Creaholic works on projects for the likes of IKEA, Leica, Lufthansa and BMW.

Mock is the co-inventor of more than 180 patent families in such diverse industries as watchmaking, automotive, food or pharmaceutical, and he is at the origin of 750 projects and 8 start-ups. He is considered a veteran of Swiss innovation. In 2009, he entered the "Forum of 100 personalities who make up French-speaking Switzerland", drawn up every year by the Swiss monthly publication "l'Hebdo". In 2017, he was a finalist from a pool of 400 candidates for the European Inventor of the Year Award in the category – Lifetime Achievement - awarded by the European Patent Office. According to Benoît Battistelli, the president of the EPO, "Elmar Mock has always dared to challenge the status quo". In 2019, he was appointed as one of the leading experts that judge proposals for this award.

== Prizes and awards ==
- 2009, "Forum of 100", Lausanne
- 2010, GAIA Award with Jacques Müller for the invention of the SWATCH
- 2014, FNEG Scientific Essay Prize, Marseille
- 2017 Finalist European Inventor of the Year Award – EPO Lifetime Achievement category

== Bibliography ==
- Gilles Garel and Elmar Mock, "The Innovation Factory", Paris, Dunod, 2012, 176 p. ISBN 978-2-100-57702-6
- "The Innovation Factory" - 2nd ed. - Embark on Innovative Design, co-written with Gilles Garel, 2016, Dunod Publishing ISBN 978-2100746057

Translated into English and German

- "The Innovation Factory", 2016, Auerbach Publications, ISBN 978-1498740210
- "The Innovation Factory", 2013 GrowthPublishing, ISBN 978-2940384228

== Documentary ==
Elmar Mock- Ingénieur, "serial inventeur". La légende Swatch. 2024 - Plans fixes
