= Nani Beccalli =

Swiss businessman

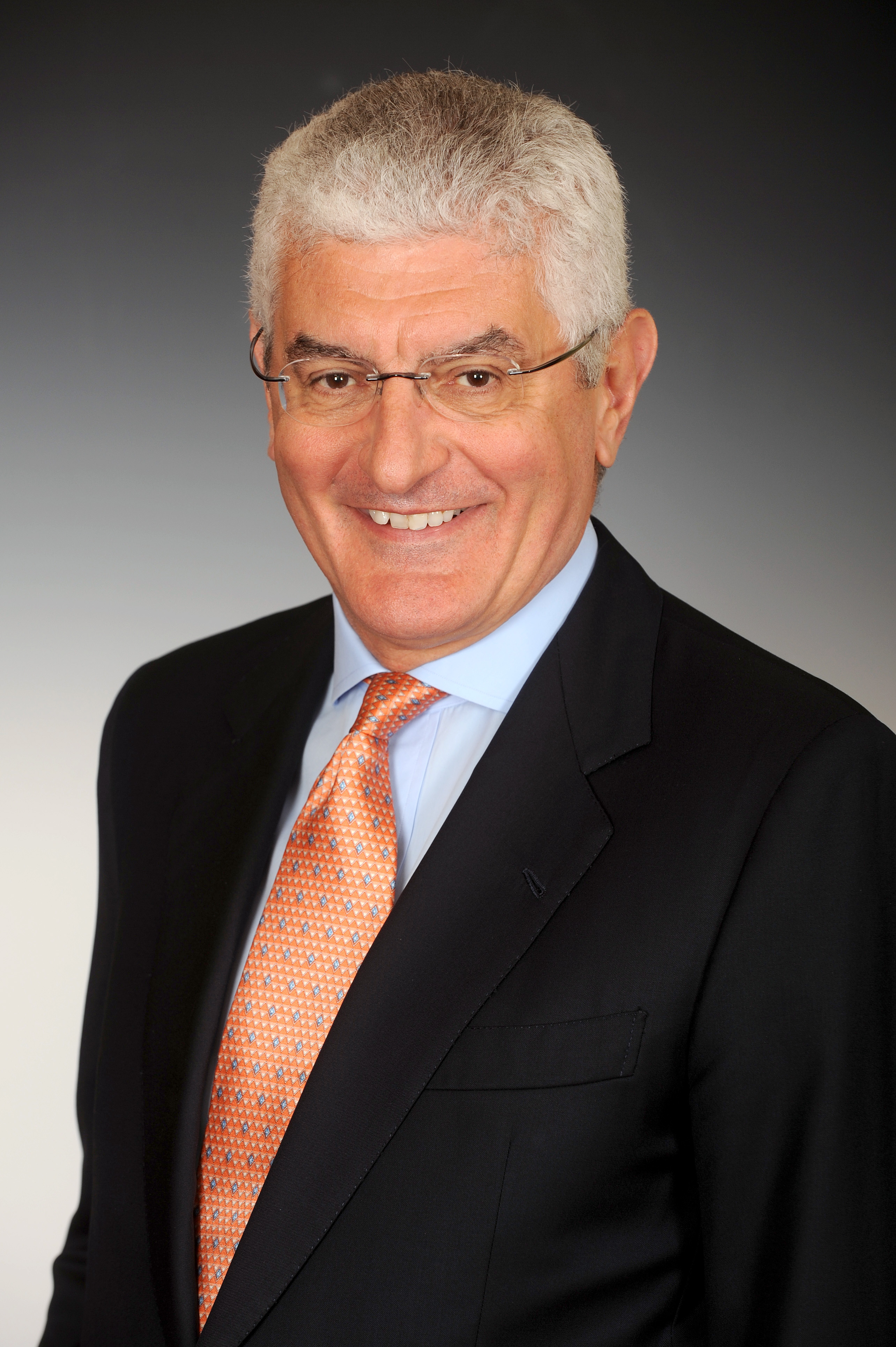
- Born: Ferdinando Falco Beccalli
- Occupation: Senior Operating Executive of Rhône Capital
- Employer: Falco Enterprises
- Board member of: Covestro; ASK Chemicals; Neovia Logistics; Ranpak Corp. Zodiac; Foreign Policy Association; Centre for European Policy Studies
- Awards: Cavaliere del Lavoro; Legion of Honour

Ferdinando "Nani" Falco Beccalli is CEO of Falco Enterprises, based in Zürich, Switzerland. He is also Senior Operating Executive of Rhône Capital, Chairman of ASK Chemicals and Zodiac.

Falco Beccalli also serves as a Member of the Board of Directors of Neovia Logistics, of the Foreign Policy Association in New York and of the Centre for European Policy Studies (CEPS) in Brussels, as Member of the Supervisory Board of Covestro, as Senior Advisor to A.T. Kearney Italia and to the Steering Committee of the LUISS School of Government. He participates in the International Board of Overseers of the Sabancı University.

Prior to his current roles, he spent 40 years at GE. Having started his career in the United States in 1975, he served in leadership positions in the U.S., the Netherlands, Japan, Belgium and Germany, and left the company in 2014 as Senior Vice President and member of the Corporate Executive Council responsible for GE Europe.

Previously, he served on the Science and Technology Advisory Council to European Commission President José Manuel Barroso; as President of ENAV, as President of the Board of GE Avio S.r.l; as Member of the Board of Inter RAO, of the GE Foundation, of the Junior Achievement Young Enterprise Europe and of the Emmanuel Wöhrl Stiftung, Germany; and was Member of the Trilateral Commission. He was an International Advisor to Bocconi University in Milan, to Prime Minister Raffarin of France and to the Polish Minister of Finance in 1995 and participated in the International Business Advisory Council of the cities of Jerusalem, Rome and Rotterdam.

In 2007, President Napolitano appointed him Cavaliere del Lavoro (Order of Merit for Labour). In 2009, President Sarkozy has granted him the Legion of Honour.

A native of Italy, Falco Beccalli earned a master's degree in chemical engineering from the Polytechnic University of Turin in Italy.
