= Immunoscore =

The Immunoscore is a method to estimate the prognosis of cancer patients, based on the immune cells that infiltrate cancer and surround it. The Immunoscore has been internationally validated in colorectal cancer and provides better prognostic information than the current staging system, TNM. In other malignancies the Immunoscore has not yet been validated. It is based on Jerome Galon's finding from 2006 which revealed a positive association of cytotoxic and memory T cells with survival of colorectal cancer patients.

== Introduction ==
The most common system for classifying the extent of spread of cancer is the TNM classification, which has been used for over 80 years. However, its prognostic accuracy is limited and clinical outcome can significantly vary among patients within the same tumor stage. This method fails to incorporate the effects of the host immune response and focus only on the tumor cells. From the beginning of 21st century, growing evidences supports the important role of the immune system in cancer surveillance and clearance. The ability to avoid immune destruction has been introduced as a hallmark of cancer. Immunoscore incorporates the effects of the host immune response into cancer classification and improves prognostic accuracy. It measures the density of two T lymphocyte populations (CD3/CD8, CD3/CD45RO or CD8/CD45RO) in the center and at the periphery of the tumor. The Immunoscore provides a score ranging from 0 (I0) when low densities of both cell types are found in both regions, to Immunoscore 4 (I4) when high densities are found in both regions. The Immunoscore does not measure how the immune cells in the periphery of the tumor are organized, or the amount of B-cells, tertiary lymphoid structures and germinal centers. All of these have important roles in the immune response to colorectal and other cancers.
