= Patrick Couvreur =

French pharmacologist

- Born: January 18, 1950 (age 76); Schaerbeek, Belgium
- Education: University of Namur; Catholic University of Louvain
- Awards: Prix Galien (2009); CNRS Innovation Medal (2012); European Inventor Award (2013)
- Scientific career
- Fields: Pharmacology; Nanotechnology; Drug vectorization
- Workplaces: University of Paris-Sud

Patrick Couvreur, born 1950 in Schaerbeek (Brussels), is a French pharmacologist who specialises in medical nanotechnology and is currently professor at the University of Paris-Sud.

Couvreur was elected as a member into the National Academy of Engineering in 2015 for advances in nanomedicine and commercialization of targeted nanotechnology systems for cancer treatment.

== Biography ==
Patrick Couvreur obtained his Candidature in pharmaceutical science in 1969, at the University of Namur, followed by a diploma in pharmacy in 1972, at the Catholic University of Louvain (UCL). He received a Doctorate in pharmaceutical science in 1975 from the same university, where he worked in the laboratory next door to the Belgian Nobel Prize winner, Christian de Duve, who was an inspiration for his subsequent career.

From 1976 to 1977 he was a postdoctoral researcher at ETH Zurich, before joining the Catholic University of Louvain, first as a senior research assistant, and then as a senior researcher.

In 1984 he was appointed to a professorship at the Institut Galien Paris Sud (University of Paris-Sud/CNRS).

In 2009–2010, he held the Liliane Bettencourt Chair of Technological Innovation at the Collège de France.

He has three children and several grandchildren.

== Principal achievements ==
Patrick Couvreur is known for his work in the field of drug vectorization for the treatment of cancer.

In 1997 he founded BioAlliance, a company that employs more than 60 people. In 2007, he founded Medsqual, a start-up that seeks to develop nanomedicines based on squalene

== Prizes and distinctions ==
Patrick Couvreur was awarded the Prix Galien in 2009 for his work on "squalenization", a significant advance in drug vectorization that involves coupling an active ingredient with squalene. In the same year he received 2,2 million euros of funding from the European Research Council (ERC).

On 20 June 2012, he shared the CNRS Innovation Medal with Alain Benoit and José-Alain Sahel.

In 2013 Patrick Couvreur was awarded the European Inventor Award for his work on nanocapsules for cancer treatment.

Patrick Couvreur is a member of the French Academy of Sciences, the French Academy of Technologies the Académie Nationale de Médecine and the Académie de Pharmacie. He is also a foreign member of the National Academy of Medicine (USA), the National Academy of Engineering (USA), the Belgian Royal Academy of Medicine and the Real Academia Nacional de Farmacia (Spain).

On 31 December 2017, he was appointed a Chevalier of the Legion of Honor.

In 2019, he received the Journal of Drug Targeting's Lifetime Achievement Award.
