= Fathiya Mbarak Khamis =

Kenya Scientist

- Citizenship: Kenya
- Education: Jomo Kenyatta University of Agriculture and Technology; Kenyatta University
- Awards: TWAS - Abdool Karim Award
- Scientific career
- Fields: Molecular Biology
- Workplaces: Kenyatta University

Fathiya Mbarak Khamis is a Kenyan molecular biologist and an elected a fellow of the African Academy of Sciences (FAAS)

== Early life and education ==
Fathiya obtained her first and second degree in Biochemistry from Jomo Kenyatta University of Agriculture and Technology. In 2009, she obtained her doctorate in Molecular Biology at Kenyatta University.

== Career ==
Fathiya started her career at Kenyatta University as a graduate assistant and she later became a tutorial fellow and lecturer at the department of Biochemistry and Biotechnology.

== Awards ==
Fathiya received the 2019 TWAS Abdool Karim Prize in Biological Sciences for her research on native and invasive pests that eats fruits and vegetables in Africa.

== Membership ==
Fathiya Mbarak Khamis was elected a Fellow of the African Academy of Sciences in 2022
