= Geox =

Italian brand

Coordinates: 45.7860037°N 12.050606°E

Geox S.p.A.
- Type: Public
- Traded as: BIT: GEO
- Industry: Textiles Manufacturing
- Founded: 1995; 31 years ago
- Founder: Mario Moretti Polegato
- Headquarters: Montebelluna, Italy
- Key people: Mario Moretti Polegato (founder and chairman); Francesco di Giovanni (CEO)
- Products: Footwear, clothing
- Revenue: €534.9 million (2020)
- Operating income: €-111.0 million (2020)
- Net income: €-128.2 million (2020)
- Number of employees: 4,458 (end 2020)
- Subsidiaries: Diadora
- Website: geox.com

Geox S.p.A. is an Italian brand of shoe and clothing manufactured with breathable and waterproof fabrics.

== History ==
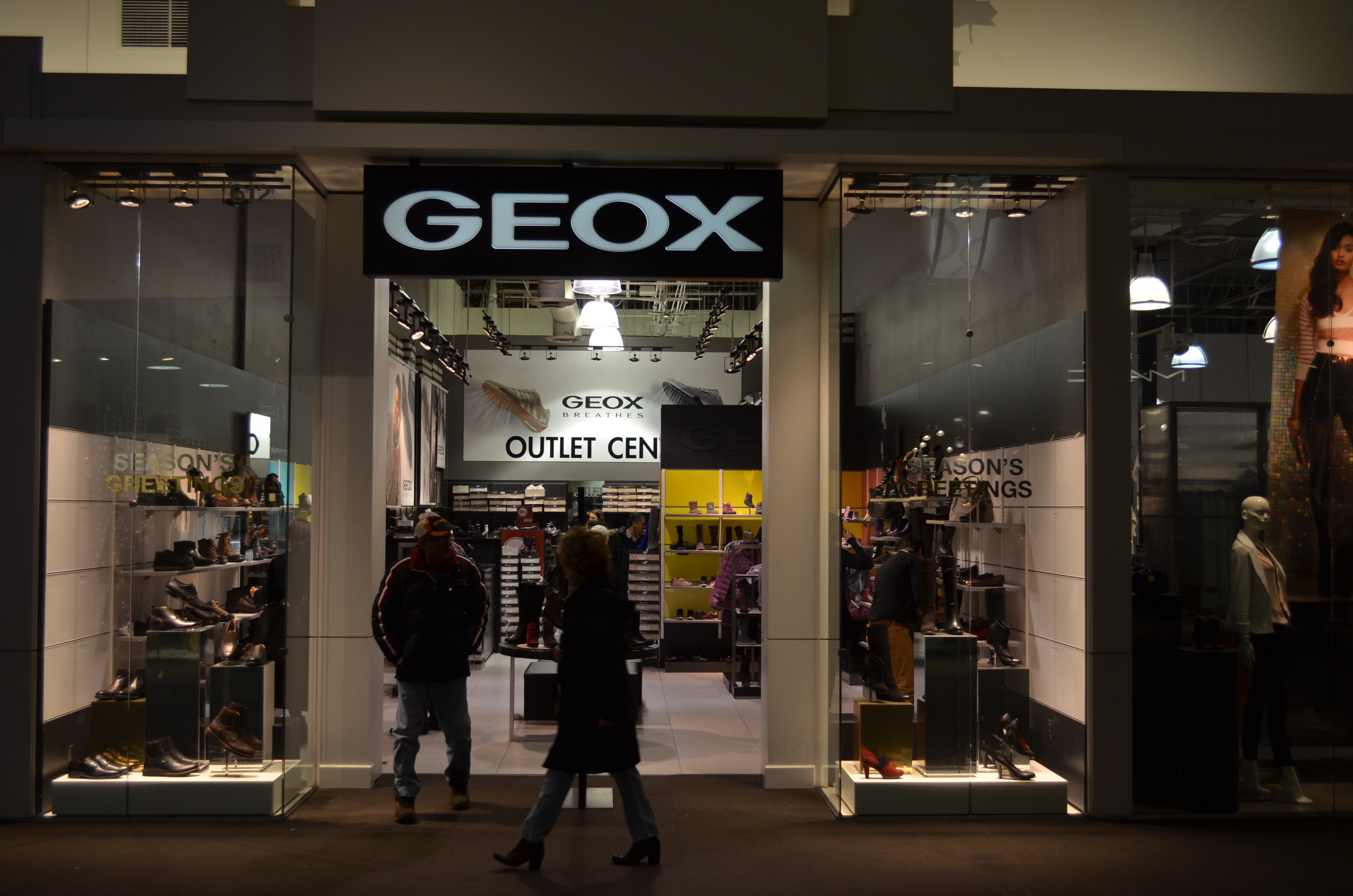
A Geox store in Vaughan Mills, Canada in 2013

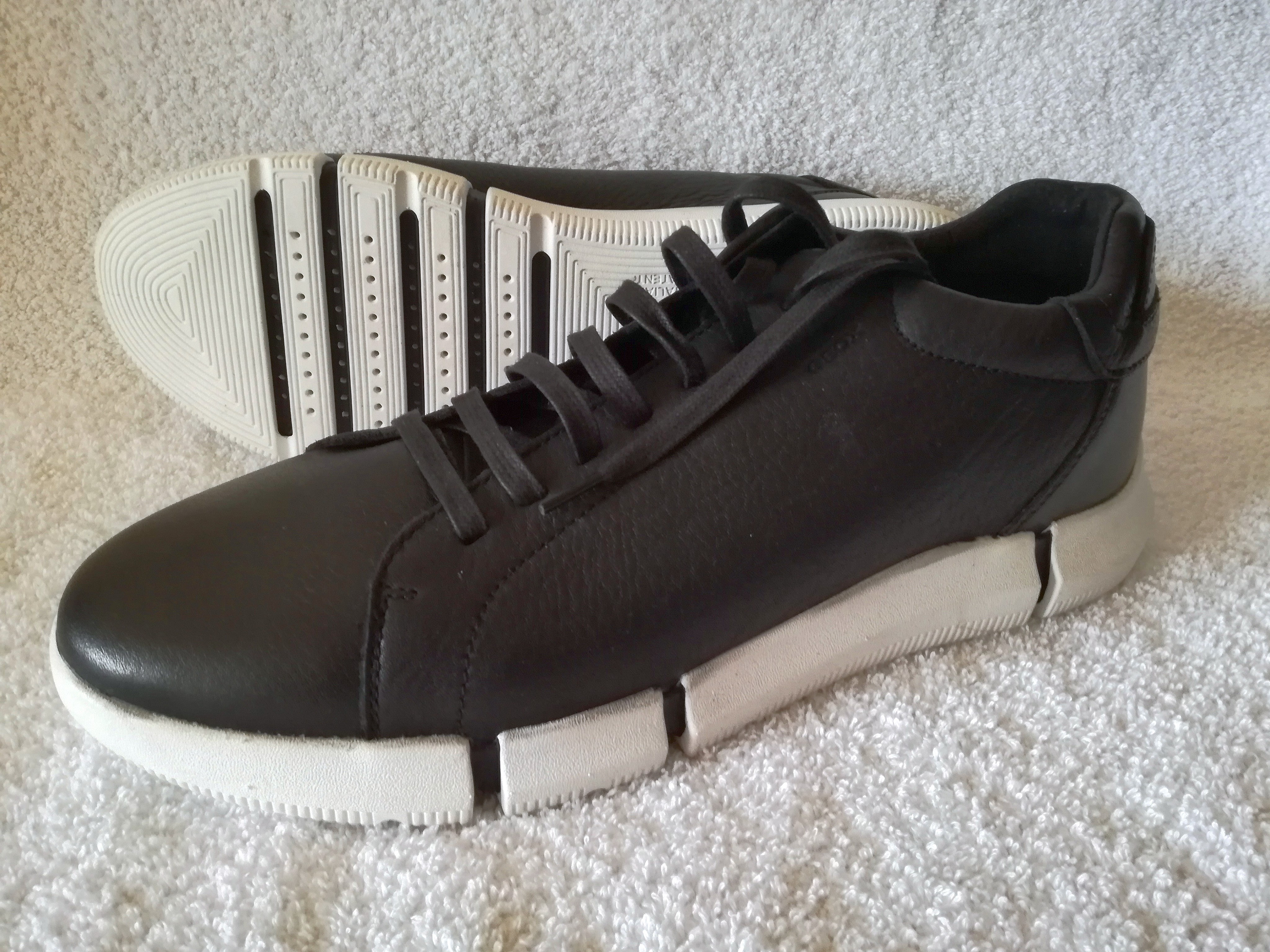
Geox shoes with breathable soles

The company was founded in 1995 by Mario Polegato.

In 2009, Geox agreed with Italian sportswear company Diadora to have Polegato buy its assets through his family's investment arm, LIR.

On September 8, 2020, Geox filed for bankruptcy in Canada.

Production sites are in China, Indonesia and Vietnam.

In July 2021, Geox announced the closure of its Vranje plant in Serbia, which opened in 2015. The closure led to the loss of 1,200 jobs.

On September 20, 2023, Penélope Cruz became the first brand ambassador for Geox.

== Geox in Russia ==
In March 2022, despite Russia's invasion of Ukraine, Geox opened its 80th store in Russia. According to a list compiled by Yale SOM, the company has suspended new investments in Russia. Despite the cessation of new investments, it can be argued that the company is still active in Russia, as in December 2022, Geox presented a new capsule collection of shoes and accessories for the spring-summer 2023 season. "Sales in Russia and Ukraine, which together account for about 10% of the group's total, were in line with plans at about 37 million euros despite the weakening of the ruble."- firm said.
