= Lion lights =

Lights to scare lions

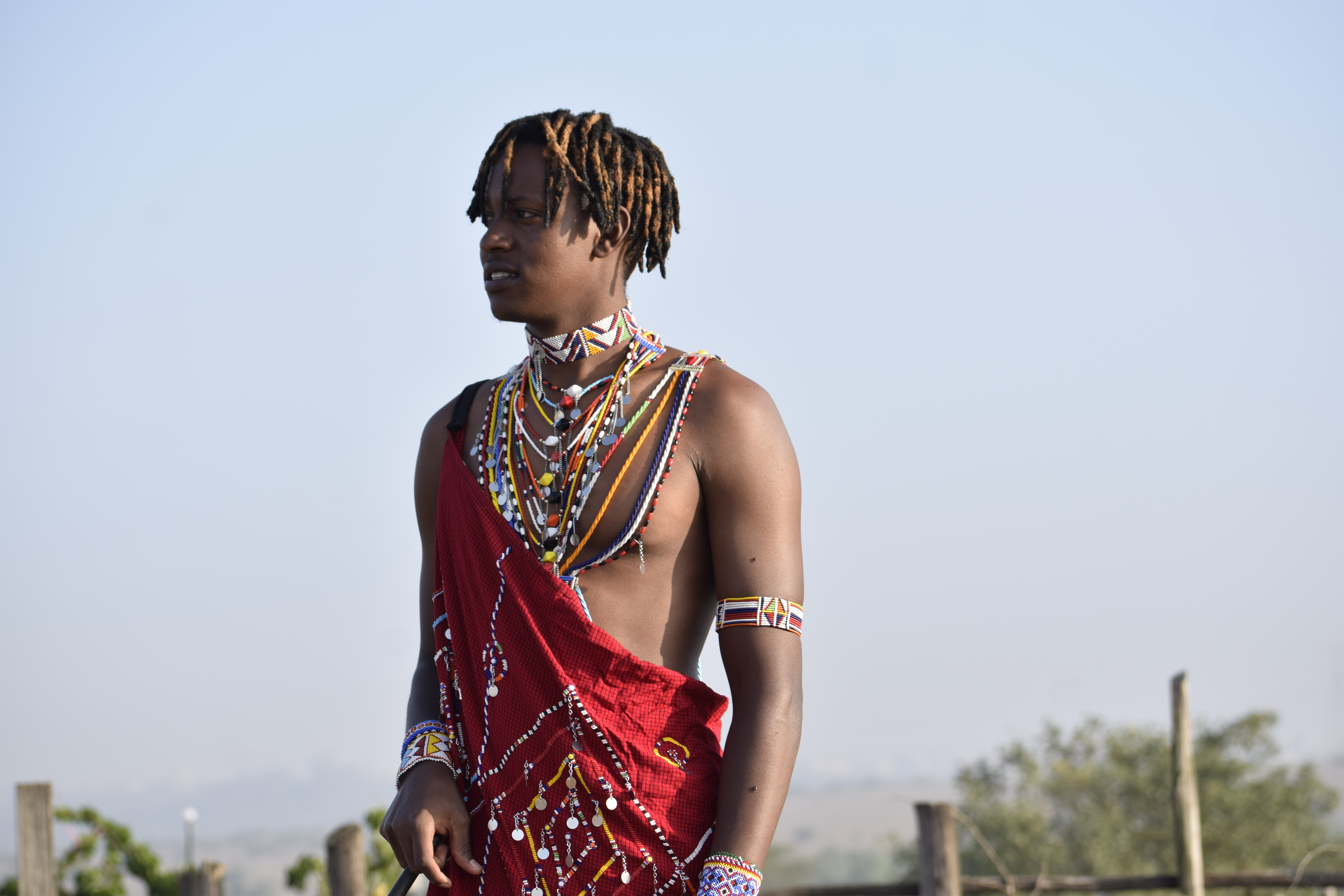
- Type: Predator deterrent system
- Inception: 2009
- Manufacturer: Richard Turere

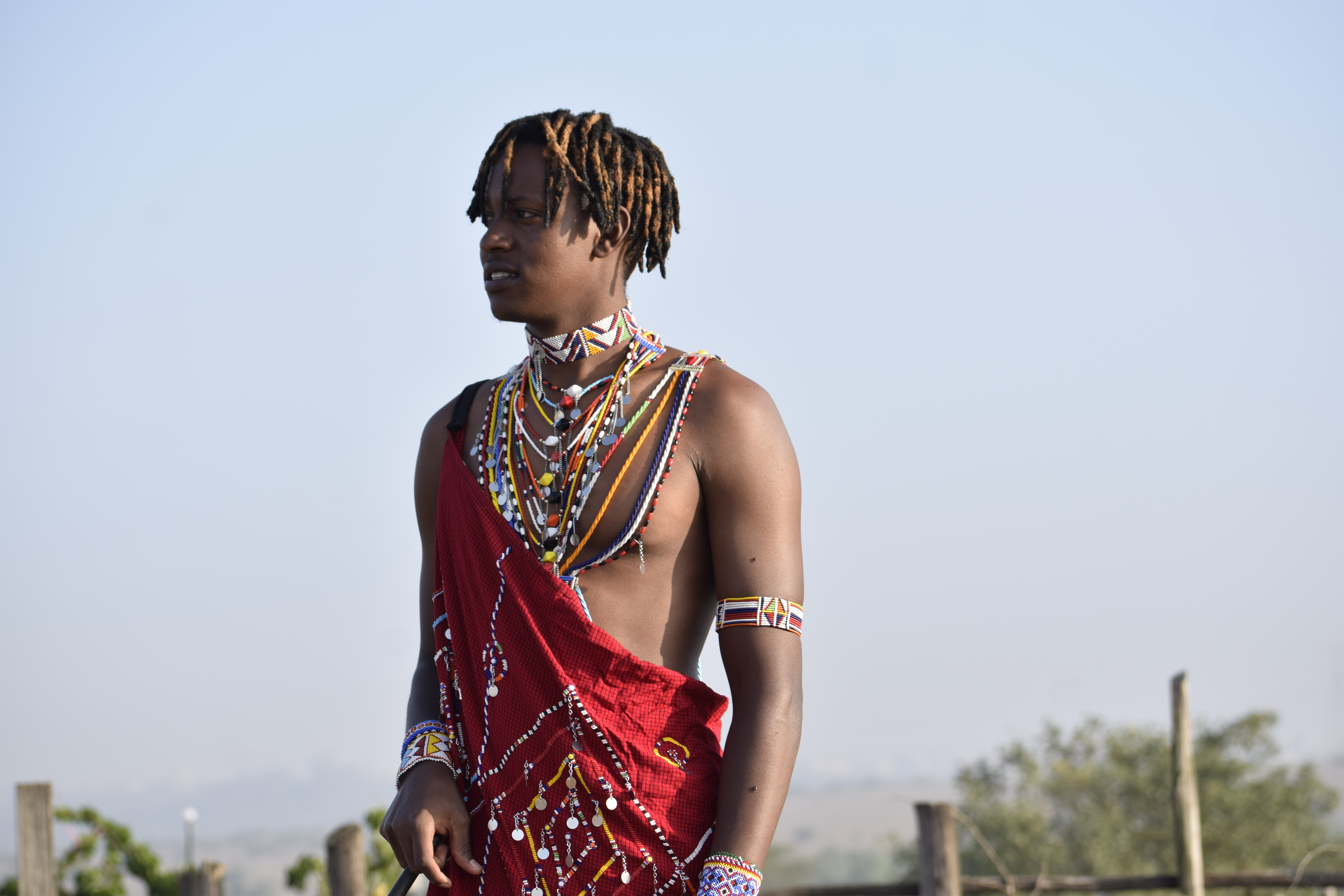
Richard Turere, inventor of the Lion Lights system.

Lion lights are devices designed to scare away lions from a set perimeter to protect cattle and other herd animals. Lion lights were originally invented by Richard Turere to prevent night attacks by lions on his family's cattle, which also helps prevent lions from being hunted in retaliation by poachers.

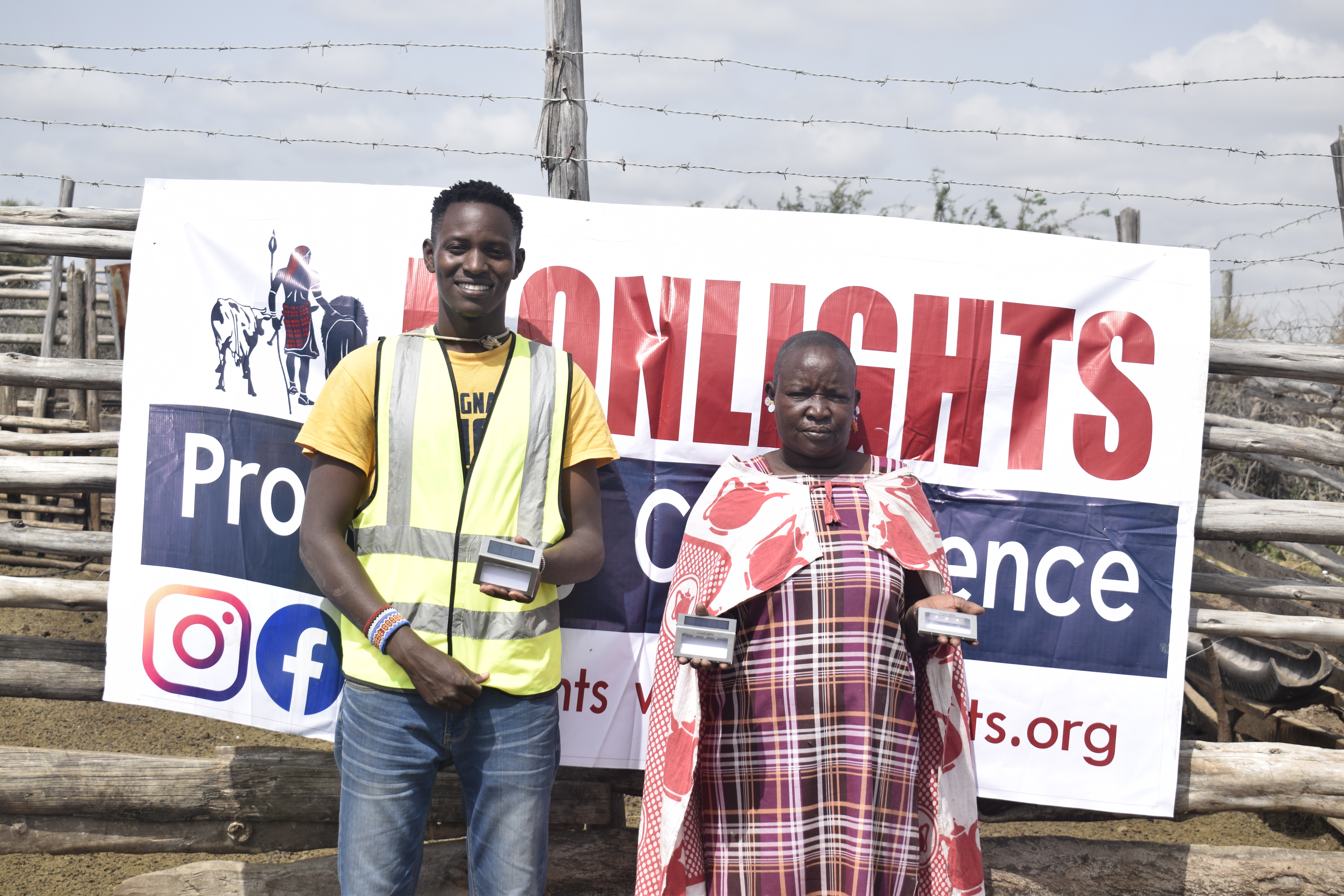
Lion Lights systems have been implemented in various African communities.

== Background ==
In Kenya, the number of lions in Kenya plummeted from 15,000 to 2,500 within two decades, placing lions on a path to extinction.

One contributing factor is that, due to a loss of habitat, predators frequently turn to hunting livestock rather than other wild animals, which leads to lions being killed in retaliation by poachers.

== History ==
Turere began taking care of his father's cattle at the age of nine. Determined to find a solution to this problem that would benefit both local farmers and wildlife, Turere started experimenting with lighting fires, kerosene lamps, and scarecrows. However, "none of them worked because predators are clever." Turere noticed that the lions did not attack when people were present, and he theorized that they were deterred by moving torchlight. Therefore, Turere placed LED lights around the perimeter of his family's cow shed, connected them to vehicle indicator flashers, and powered the system from car batteries charged by a solar panel. The lion attacks ceased, and neighbours soon asked him to set up similar systems around their farms. This invention became the driving force behind Turere's creation of the Lion Lights system.

"I developed a sequence of intermittently flashing lights that continuously changed over time, thereby deceiving the lions into believing that someone was traversing the area with a flashlight. Thanks to my invention, our weekly loss of three cows was entirely eradicated," Turere said to WIPO Magazine.

Based on this invention, Turere won a scholarship to Brookhouse School.

Turere and his Lion Lights also made the final three for the Young Inventors Prize at the 2023 European Inventor Award. He came in first, winning the main trophy, as well as €20,000 to help with his work.
