= Adnane Remmal =

Moroccan pharmacology professor, senior researcher, and entrepreneur

Adnane Remmal (Arabic: عدنان رمال; born 1962) is a Moroccan pharmacology professor, senior researcher, and entrepreneur in the field of biotechnology at Sidi Mohamed Ben Abdellah University. His works focus on fighting antimicrobial resistance, one of the major threats to public health in both developed and emerging countries. Among other results, he has successfully patented a solution to boost antibiotics against antibiotic-resistant bacteria, and an alternative to replace antibiotics in poultry feed. In 2017, he was the recipient of the European Patent Office (EPO) Popular Prize category award. EPO President Benoît Battistelli declared "The public vote for Adnane Remmal recognises his contribution to fighting the growing threat of antibiotic-resistant microbes."

== Early life and education ==
Adnane Remmal was born in the millennial city of Fez, Morocco in February 1962. He studied in Morocco until the second year of university. In 1982, he was admitted to pursue his studies in the leading scientific center of Orsay (University of Paris XI). In 1984, he joined Pr Edouard Coraboeuf’s team with whom he received his electrophysiology and cardiovascular pharmacology postgraduate diploma. He then joined the team of Pr Philippe Meyer at Necker hospital in Paris for his PhD in molecular pharmacology. In 1987, he received his PhD and decided to leave France to explore scientific research projects in Morocco. He was already aware that antibiotic resistance was a major threat in the country and around the world.

== Career ==
In 1988, Remmal became a professor and researcher at Sidi Mohamed Ben Abdellah University where he taught several among which cellular biology, microbiology and molecular biology. At the outset of his research on antibiotics resistance, he worked closely with other researchers from Moroccan and international institutions. His first results in fundamental research on the antimicrobial activity of essential oils allowed him to receive a second PhD in Microbiology in 1994 (University of Fez).

For over years now, Adnane Remmal has researched the development of solutions to treat patients with resistant infections on which the current treatments do not have any effect anymore, along with solutions to prevent resistance caused by the environment and the food chain as it is today. Adnane Remmal has published dozens of academic papers and contributed to the training of dozens of young researchers during their masters and PhD degrees who are now active in different research centers in Morocco and abroad.

Remmal co-founded the companies Advanced Scientific Developments (ASD) and Industrial Laboratory of Agricultural and Veterinary Products (LIPAV)., ASD filed four patents to protect the concept of boosting anti-infectious agents; These four patents were delivered in different regions in the world. ASD also raised funds to continue research on the boosting mechanism and to conduct pre-clinical and clinical tests of boosted drugs.

== Awards and honours ==
In 2015, Professor Remmal was awarded the innovation prize for Africa by the AIF, a Switzerland based foundation. Remmal was also the winner of the 2017 European Inventor Award organized by the European Patent Office (EPO) in the Popular Prize category. Also in 2017, he was decorated by King Mohammed VI of Morocco with the Kingdom’s highest honor, the Order of Ouissam Alaouite (Arabic: الوسام العلوي الشريف), for his significant scientific and academic achievements.

On 6 November 2026, Professor Remmal was awarded the UNESCO-Equatorial Guinea International Prize for Research in the Life Sciences by UNESCO.
