= Bluetech Award =

Annual award presented by the Clean Air Alliance of China

Bluetech International Clean Air Technology Award
- Sponsored by: Clean Air Alliance of China
- Country: China

The Bluetech International Clean Air Technology Award (also called Bluetech Award), is an annual award presented by the Clean Air Alliance of China (CAAC) to recognize outstanding technologies that prevent and control different forms and sources of air pollution. The award examines each technology for breakthrough potential in terms of technological performance, environmental impact, and financial feasibility with CAAC's standardized technology assessment methodology. The award selection committee consists of technical professionals, industrial experts and testing specialists that are chosen every year to fit each year's award categories. Technologies from around the world are eligible to apply.

The award ceremony, called the Bluetech International Clean Air Forum, features research leaders, industries, investors and policymakers in China and abroad to address global industry and policy trends in the air quality sector. Private follow-up events, held in Beijing and other pilot regions, are organised for Alliance members and selected technology companies. The first Bluetech Award Ceremony was held on December 12, 2015, in Beijing, China. The second Bluetech Award Ceremony is planned for December 2016.

== Winners ==
Award year	Technology Name	Applicant	Category
2015	Diesel Particulate Filter System	Wuxi WeifuLida Catalytic Converter Co., Ltd.	Diesel engine emission reduction technologies & clean energy substitutes
2015	Multi Functional Diesel Performance Additive	Total Petroleum (Shanghai) Co., Ltd.	Diesel engine emission reduction technologies & clean energy substitutes
2015	Low Emission Control Technology for Valves	Garlock Sealing Technologies (Shanghai) Co., Ltd.	VOCs substitution, monitoring and pollution prevention
2015	MayAir "Electric-Pocket" Technology	MayAir Technology (China) Co., Ltd	Indoor air quality monitoring and air purification
2015	EKEAIR MKJ4000 Air Purification Disinfector	Jiaxing Sanyin Environmental Purification Technology Co., Ltd.	Indoor air quality monitoring and air purification
