= Mario Moretti Polegato =

Italian entrepreneur (born 1952)

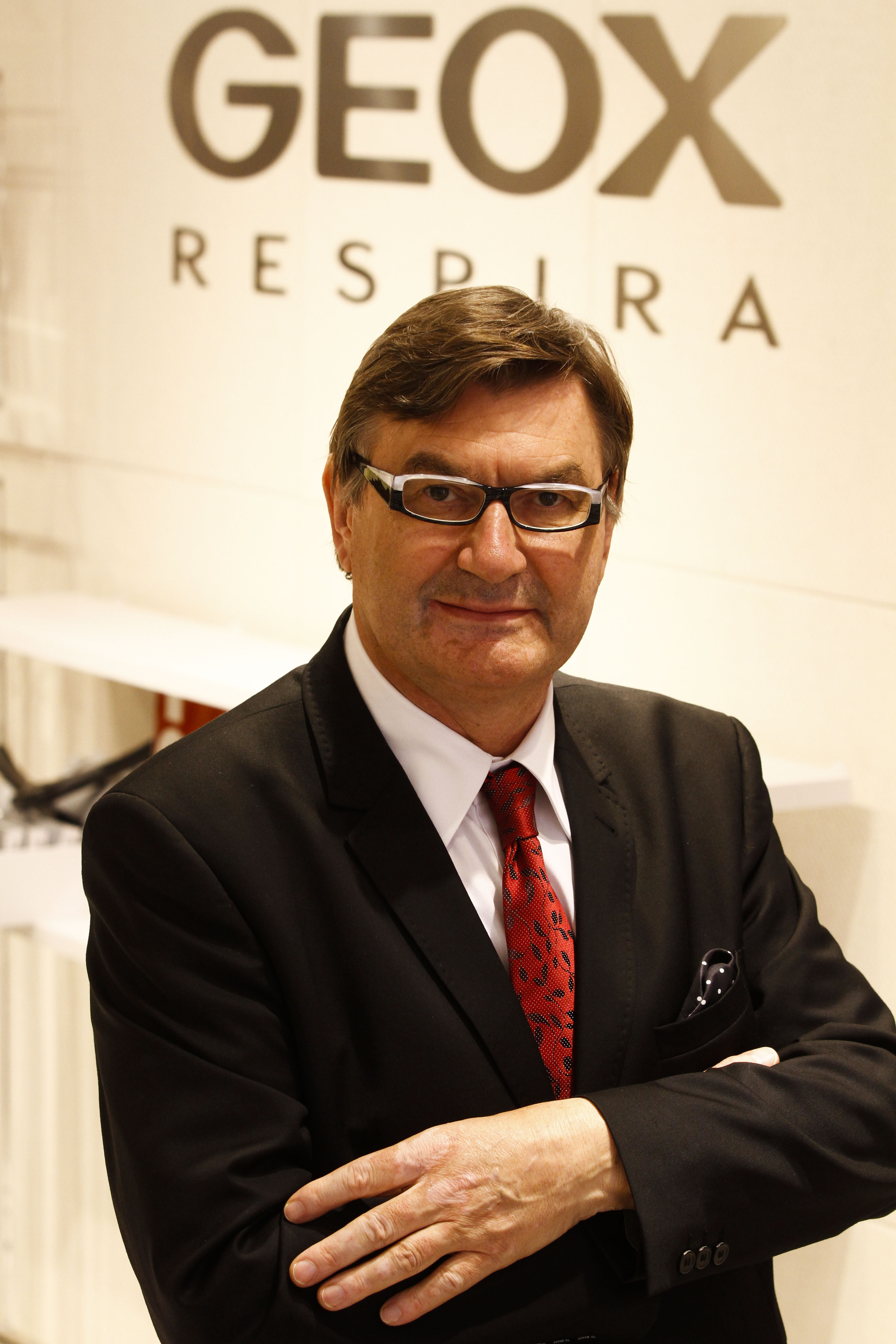
- Mario Moretti Polegato in 2013
- Born: 16 August 1952 (age 73); Crocetta del Montello, Italy
- Occupation: entrepreneur

Mario Moretti Polegato (born 16 August 1952) is an Italian entrepreneur, active in the footwear sector, who founded the company Geox of which he is the president.

== Biography ==
He was born in Crocetta del Montello (Treviso), Italy, into a family of entrepreneurs active in the agricultural and winemaking sector. Following in the family's footsteps, he studied oenology. For several years he worked in the family business. He established Geox in order to produce a shoe that breathes.

During his working life, Polegato has received acknowledgements including Knight of the National Order of Merit from the President of Romania in 2000. In 2002, he was nominated Entrepreneur of the Year – a title given to him by Ernst & Young – and in 2003 he received the Best Italian Entrepreneur in the World award, also from Ernst & Young Global. In 2005, the former Italian President Carlo Azeglio Ciampi bestowed him the title of Cavaliere del Lavoro della Repubblica Italiana (Knight of Labour), whereas in 2006 the Italian President Giorgio Napolitano awarded him the title of Grande Ufficiale della Repubblica (Great Officer of the Republic). The European School of Management Italia (ESCP-EAP) named him Affiliate Professor of Entrepreneurship.

In 2010, he received the European Business Leader Award (EBLA) for the Innovator of the Year category, an acknowledgement that the Financial Times and CNBC bestow on key players in the global economy every year. He was appointed as a member of the international panel of judges for the "European Inventor Award", organised by the European Patent Office (EPO), which selects and awards the best patented inventions worldwide every year.

He has held the diplomatic position of Honorary Consul General of Romania for North-East Italy since 1997, and he has been a member of the Executive Board of Confindustria (General Confederation of Italian Industry) since 2003. In 2014, he became a member of the Regency Council of the Bank of Italy. He received the America Award of the Italy-USA Foundation in 2015.

== The Group ==
Polegato is the President of the Geox Group, which he founded. It is an Italian company in the comfortable footwear sector. Geox has also used its own brand to produce clothing with breathable technologies. In 2004, Geox was listed on the Borsa Italiana.

Polegato is the President of LIR Srl, a finance company based in Treviso, which is owned by the family. Through this company, he controls Geox and Diadora, an Italian brand that represents sport, which was taken over in 2009 and is led by his son Enrico.

== Honours ==
- Honorary Doctorate from the University of Agricultural Science and Veterinary Medicine of Banatului, Timișoara (Romania);
- Honorary master's degree from Cà Foscari University of Venice in Chemistry and Environmental Compatibility;
- Honorary Degree from the University of Florence in Economics.

== See also ==
- Montebelluna
