= List of people who have headed the United States Patent Office =

Following is a list of persons who have headed the United States Patent Office. The title associated with this function has changed over time, from Superintendent of Patents to Commissioner of Patents to Undersecretary of Commerce for Intellectual Property. The duties of the office have also evolved significantly, including coming to encompass the supervision of trademark issuance as well as that of patents.

No.	Portrait	Patent Office Head	Began service	Ended service	Refs.
Commissioners for the Promotion of Useful Arts or Patent Board
		Edmund Randolph; Henry Knox; Thomas Jefferson	1790	1793	
Secretary of State (Note: Patent Act of 1793 transferred responsibility for patents to the Secretary of State.)
		Edmund Randolph	1794	1795	
		Timothy Pickering	1795	May 12, 1800	
		John Marshall	May 13, 1800	March 4, 1801	
		James Madison	March 5, 1801	1802	
Superintendent of Patents
1		William Thornton	June 1, 1802	March 28, 1828	
2		Thomas P. Jones	April 12, 1828	June 10, 1829	
3		John D. Craig	June 11, 1829	February 1, 1835	
4		James Chamberlayne Pickett	February 1, 1835	May 1835	
Commissioner of Patents (Patent Act of July 4, 1836)
5		Henry Leavitt Ellsworth	July 8, 1835	April 1, 1845 (Note: Title of office changed from Superintendent to Commissioner on July 4, 1836.)	
6		Edmund Burke	May 4, 1845	1849	
7		Thomas Ewbank	May 9, 1849	1852	
8		Silas H. Hodges	November 8, 1852	1853	
9		Charles Mason	May 16, 1853	August 5, 1857	
10		Joseph Holt	September 10, 1857	Mar 1859	
11		William D. Bishop	May 27, 1859	1860	
12		Philip Francis Thomas	February 16, 1860	December 10, 1860	
13		David P. Holloway	March 28, 1861	1865	
14		Thomas Clarke Theaker	August 17, 1865	January 20, 1868	
15		Elisha Foote	July 29, 1868	Mar 1869	
16		Samuel S. Fisher	April 26, 1869	November 10, 1870	
17		Mortimer Dormer Leggett	January 16, 1871	1874	
18		John M. Thacher	November 4, 1874	October 1, 1875	
19		R. Holland Duell	October 1, 1875	1877	
20		Ellis Spear	January 30, 1877	1878	
21		Halbert E. Paine	November 1, 1878	May 1, 1880	
22		Edgar M. Marble	May 7, 1880	1883	
23		Benjamin Butterworth	November 1, 1883	1885	
24		Martin V. Montgomery	March 23, 1885	1887	
25		Benton Jay Hall	April 12, 1887	1889	
26		Charles Elliott Mitchell	April 1, 1889	1891	
27		William E. Simonds	August 1, 1891	1892	
28		John S. Seymour	March 31, 1893	1897	
29		Benjamin Butterworth	April 7, 1897	1898	
30		Charles Holland Duell	February 3, 1898	1901	
31		Frederick Innes Allen	April 11, 1901	1907	
32		Edward Bruce Moore	1907	1913	
33		Thomas Ewing III	1913	1917	
34		James T. Newton	1917	1920	
35		Robert Frederick Whitehead	1920	1921	
36		Melvin H. Coulston	1921	1921	
37		Thomas E. Robertson	1921	1933	
38		Conway Peyton Coe	1933	September 14, 1945	
39		Casper W. Ooms	September 15, 1945	1947	
40		Lawrence C. Kingsland	1947	1949	
41		John A. Marzall	1949	1953	
42		Robert C. Watson	1953	1961	
43		David Ladd	1961	1963	
44		Edward J. Brenner	1964	1969	
45		William E. Schuyler Jr.	1969	1971	
46		Robert Gottschalk	1972	1973	
Commissioner of Patents and Trademarks (PL 93-596 of January 2, 1975)
47		C. Marshall Dann	1974	1977	
48		Donald W. Banner	1978	1979	
49		Sidney A. Diamond	1979	1981	
Assistant Secretary of Commerce and Commissioner of Patents and Trademarks (Public Law 97-366 of October 25, 1982)
50		Gerald J. Mossinghoff	1981	1985	
51		Donald J. Quigg	1985	1990	
52		Harry F. Manbeck Jr.	1990	1992	
53		Bruce Lehman	August 5, 1993	December 31, 1998	
Under Secretary of Commerce for Intellectual Property and Director of the U.S. Patent and Trademark Office (American Inventor’s Protection Act of November 29, 1999)
54		Q. Todd Dickinson (Note: Dickinson served in analogous role as Assistant Secretary of Commerce and Commissioner of Patents and Trademarks beginning in 1998. That position was transformed into the Under Secretary of Commerce for Intellectual Property and Director of the United States Patent and Trademark Office effective January 17, 2001.)	January 1, 1999	January 20, 2001	
acting		Nicholas P. Godici	January 20, 2001	November 30, 2001	
55		James E. Rogan	December 10, 2001	January 9, 2004	
56		Jon Dudas	January 12, 2004	November 14, 2008	
acting		John J. Doll	November 15, 2008	August 12, 2009	
57		David Kappos	August 13, 2009	January 31, 2013	
acting		Teresa Stanek Rea	February 1, 2013	January 12, 2014	
58		Michelle K. Lee	January 13, 2014	June 6, 2017	
acting		Joseph Matal	June 7, 2017	February 8, 2018	
59		Andrei Iancu	February 8, 2018	January 20, 2021	
interim (Note: Hirshfeld performed the duties of a director but never titled "Acting director")		Drew Hirshfeld	January 20, 2021	April 13, 2022	
60		Kathi Vidal	April 13, 2022	December 13, 2024	
acting		Derrick Brent	December 16, 2024	January 20, 2025	
acting		Coke Morgan Stewart	January 20, 2025	September 22, 2025	
61		John A. Squires	September 22, 2025	Present	

== See also ==
- Rufus Randolph Rhodes, Commissioner of Confederate States Patents from 1861 to 1865
