= The Commissioner of Patents =

The Commissioner of Patents may refer to:

- Commissioner of Patents (Australia)
- Commissioner of Patents (Canada)
- Commissioner for Patents (US) who oversees the United States Patent and Trademark Office and reports to the Under Secretary of Commerce for Intellectual Property
  - List of people who have headed the United States Patent Office

== See also ==
- List of patent offices
