= Margaret Focarino =

Margaret A. Focarino
- Education: State University of New York at Oswego; Syracuse University
- Occupations: Physicist, patent examiner, civil servant
- Known for: First female Commissioner for Patents of the United States (2012–2015)
- Title: Commissioner for Patents (2012–2015)
- Awards: Roger W. Jones Award for Executive Leadership (2010); U.S. Department of Commerce Silver Medal (2010)

Margaret A. (Peggy) Focarino is an American physicist. She was, between November 21, 2013, and January 12, 2014, the head of the United States Patent and Trademark Office (USPTO) (by delegation, as Commissioner for Patents). She was appointed in January 2012 after serving as both the Deputy Commissioner for Patents and Deputy Commissioner for Patent Operations.

== Biography ==
In 1977, Margaret received a bachelor's degree in physics from the State University of New York at Oswego, and a Certificate in Advanced Public Management from the Maxwell School of Citizenship and Public Affairs at Syracuse University. In 2015, she received her honorary doctor of science degree from the State University of New York at Oswego.

== Career ==
In 1977, Margaret joined the USPTO as a patent examiner. In 2012, she was appointed as the head of the USPTO, as the Commissioner for Patents. She was the first woman to serve as Commissioner for Patents since the position's creation in 1790, when Thomas Jefferson served as the first Commissioner.

During her time at USPTO and as Commissioner for Patents, Focarino implemented the first significant changes to the patent examiner work processes in over 30 years. This included improved case handling, new examiner incentives and performance requirements, and increased employee training and leadership opportunities. She also oversaw a major hiring initiative. As a result of her efforts, the USPTO lowered the backlog of patent applications while still improving the quality of the examinations. This is seen in the decrease of average time applicants filing an application receiving their initial determination going from 27 months in 2009 to 15 months during her time as Commissioner.

In 2010, she received one of the two annual American University School of Public Affairs Roger W. Jones Award for Executive Leadership. She received the U.S. Department of Commerce Silver Medal for leadership the same year.

In 2012, Managing Intellectual Property named Focarino one of the 50 Most Influential People in the World in Intellectual Property, one of only four women to make the list, and the only woman from the Americas.

In 2015, after a 38-year long career at the USPTO, Margaret retired.

Government offices
Preceded by Teresa Stanek Rea	Head of the United States Patent and Trademark Office; November 21, 2013 - January 12, 2014	Succeeded by Michelle K. Lee
