= Q. Todd Dickinson =

American lawyer (1952–2020)

The Honorable Q. Todd Dickinson
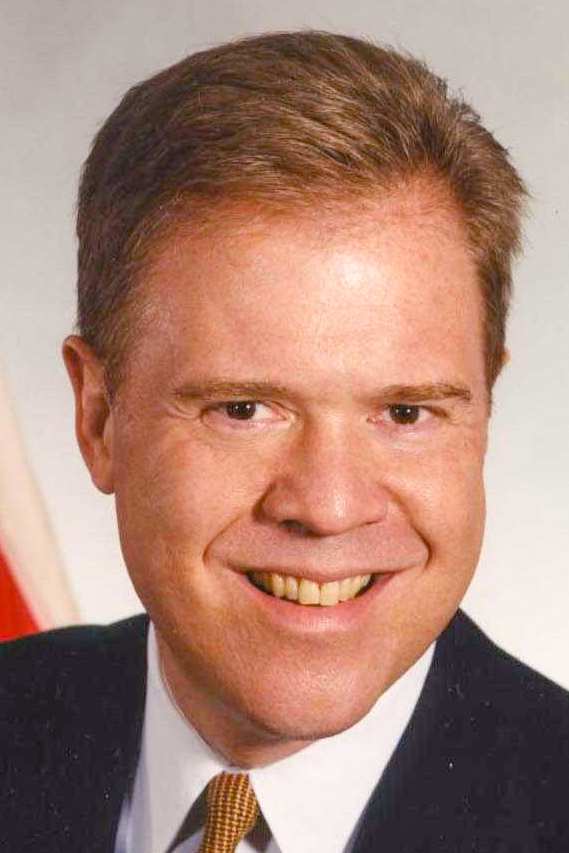

Director of the United States Patent and Trademark Office
- In office November 1999 – January 2001
- Preceded by: Bruce Lehman
- Succeeded by: James E. Rogan

Acting Commissioner of Patents and Trademarks
- In office January – November 1999

Deputy Commissioner of Patents and Trademarks
- In office June – December 1998

Personal details
- Born: December 21, 1952 Chestnut Hill, Philadelphia, Pennsylvania, U.S.
- Died: May 3, 2020 (aged 67) Warrenton, Virginia, U.S.
- Spouse: Robert H. Atkins (m. 2017)
- Education: Allegheny College (BS), University of Pittsburgh School of Law (JD)

Q. Todd Dickinson (December 21, 1952 – May 3, 2020) was an Under Secretary of Commerce for Intellectual Property and director of the United States Patent and Trademark Office (USPTO). He was an executive director of the American Intellectual Property Law Association (AIPLA), and had been mentioned by some sources for possible reappointment to his former post as director of the USPTO by the Barack Obama administration prior to the appointment of David Kappos to that post.

== Personal ==
Dickinson was born in Chestnut Hill, Philadelphia, the eldest son of John and Martha Dickinson. His legal first name is "Q", and is not an initial for a name beginning with said letter.

Dickinson and his brother John grew up in Mt. Lebanon, Pennsylvania, graduating from Mt. Lebanon High School. Dickinson and his husband Robert H. Atkins married in 2017, after a decade as partners, they lived in The Plains, Virginia.

== Early career ==
Dickinson earned a B.S. degree in Chemistry from Allegheny College in 1974, and a J.D. from the University of Pittsburgh School of Law in 1977. He was a member of the Bars of Pennsylvania, California, and Illinois, and was registered to practice before the U.S. Patent and Trademark Office.

Dickinson began his legal career as a patent and trademark lawyer with Baxter Travenol Laboratories in Deerfield, Illinois, and then took a job with the Pittsburgh, Pennsylvania, law firm of Blenko, Buell, Ziesenheim and Beck. From 1981 to 1990, he served as counsel for Chevron Corporation in San Francisco, California, focusing on domestic and international intellectual property matters. Dickinson was a founding member of the Bay Area Lawyers for Individual Freedom and served as a national governor of the Human Rights Campaign.

In 1990, Dickinson moved to Philadelphia to be Chief Counsel for Intellectual Property and Technology at Sun Company, Inc., a post he would hold until 1995, when he joined the law firm of Dechert Price & Rhoads. Dickinson was a founding master of the Benjamin Franklin Inn of Court, for intellectual property, in Philadelphia. He was also a member of the Liberty City LGBT+ Democratic Club, the Pride of Philadelphia Election Committee, and the LGBTQ Bar Association.

== Career at the USPTO ==
President Bill Clinton appointed Dickinson Deputy Commissioner of Patents and Trademarks in June 1998, and he became the Acting Commissioner of Patents and Trademarks on January 1, 1999, succeeding Bruce Lehman. Dickinson was nominated for Commissioner of Patents and Trademarks by President Clinton on July 31, 1999. After confirmation by the Senate, Dickinson took the oath of office, on November 17, 1999, as Assistant Secretary of Commerce and Commissioner of Patents and Trademarks.

In 1999, Congress passed the American Inventors Protection Act, which changed the office and titles to Under Secretary of Commerce for Intellectual Property and director of the United States Patent and Trademark Office. Dickinson served as the first Under Secretary and director of the USPTO, until January 2001.

== After the USPTO ==
After leaving the U.S. Patent and Trademark Office, Dickinson joined the Washington, D.C., office of Howrey Simon Arnold & White, becoming co-chair of its intellectual property practice. He then joined General Electric as Vice President & Chief Intellectual Property Counsel. On September 1, 2008, he was named executive director of the American Intellectual Property Law Association. He remained in that AIPLA position until July 2014, when he resigned. In March 2015, he joined Novak Druce Connolly Bove + Quigg LLP as Global Chair of its Client Select Strategic Services Group.

In 2012, Dickinson was inducted into the Intellectual Property Hall of Fame by Intellectual Asset Management magazine. In the Spring of 2016, he joined Polsinelli along with 43 other attorneys from Novak Druce and became a senior partner in its intellectual property practice.

=== Death and legacy ===
Dickinson died May 3, 2020, of respiratory failure at a hospital in Warrenton, Virginia. Andrei Iancu, then serving as Director of the USPTO, said in a statement that "Todd was immensely knowledgeable and influential in the intellectual property community. He was a warm person and a great friend to many".

Political offices
Preceded by Bruce Lehman	Assistant Secretary of Commerce and Commissioner of Patents and Trademarks; 1999 – 2000	Succeeded by N/A
Preceded by N/A	Under Secretary of Commerce for Intellectual Property; 2001	Succeeded by James E. Rogan
Government offices
Preceded by Bruce Lehman	Director of the United States Patent and Trademark Office; 1999 – 2001	Succeeded by James E. Rogan
