= CONFU =

CONFU (The Conference on Fair Use) was a 1997 conference organized by Bruce Lehman, then Commissioner of Patents and Trademarks.
