= Rufus Rhodes =

Rufus Rhodes may refer to:

- Rufus N. Rhodes (1856–1910), American journalist
- Rufus Randolph Rhodes (1818–1870), American lawyer and patent officer
