= John Doll =

John Doll is the name of:

- John J. Doll, current head of the United States Patent and Trademark Office (USPTO)
- John P. Doll (born 1961), American politician from Minnesota
- John Doll (Kansas politician) (born 1957), American politician from Kansas
