= Jon Dudas =

American lawyer (born 1968)

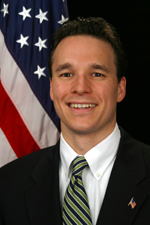

Under Secretary of Commerce for Intellectual Property Director of the United States Patent and Trademark Office
- In office July 2004 – January 18, 2009
- Appointed by: George W. Bush
- Preceded by: James E. Rogan
- Succeeded by: David Kappos

Jonathan Ward "Jon" Dudas (born July 5, 1968) is the senior vice president, senior associate to the president and secretary of the University of Arizona. He previously served as Under Secretary of Commerce for Intellectual Property and Director of the United States Patent and Trademark Office (USPTO) until January 18, 2009. He was nominated to the position by former president George W. Bush in March 2004 and appointed in July 2004. Dudas previously served as acting Under Secretary and Director, and Deputy Under Secretary and Deputy Director from 2002 to 2004. He is also a member of the board of directors of Conversant Intellectual Property Management.

== Background and career ==
Dudas holds a bachelor of science in finance, summa cum laude, from the University of Illinois and a J.D. degree from the University of Chicago Law School, with honors. He is a member of the Illinois State Bar and the Bar of the United States District Court for the Northern District of Illinois.

Before joining the Bush Administration, Dudas served six years as Counsel to the Subcommittee on Courts and Intellectual Property, and Staff Director and Deputy General Counsel for the House Committee on the Judiciary, where he guided enactment of major patent, trademark and copyright policy, including the 1999 American Inventors Protection Act, and the Digital Millennium Copyright Act. He was also instrumental in the passage of the 1996 Trademark Anti-Counterfeiting Consumer Protection Act, a law making it more difficult for seized counterfeit merchandise to re-enter the consumer marketplace. Before his employment with the House of Representatives, Dudas practiced law in the Chicago law firm of Neal Gerber & Eisenberg.

=== Under Secretary of Commerce for Intellectual Property ===
As Under Secretary of Commerce for Intellectual Property, Dudas was the lead policy advisor to the Secretary of Commerce, the President of the United States, and Administration agencies on intellectual property matters. Aiming to improve intellectual property (IP) protection for large corporations, in 2006 Dudas had USPTO IP personnel placed in several high-profile countries, including Brazil, China, Egypt, India, and Thailand.

=== Director of the USPTO ===
As director of the USPTO, Dudas was responsible for administering the laws relevant to granting patents and trademarks, and the day-to-day management of the agency's $1.7 billion budget and over 8,000 employees. He increased the hiring rate of examiners and the amount of money the PTO retains.

=== After the PTO ===
After leaving the USPTO, Dudas became a partner at the Washington, D.C., office of the law firm Foley & Lardner LLP.

=== FIRST ===
From July 5, 2010, to November 26, 2012, Dudas served as the president of FIRST.

=== University of Arizona administrator ===
On June 3, 2014, the University of Arizona announced Dudas as the senior associate to the president and secretary of the university where he continues to serve as the senior vice president and secretary.

== Quotes ==
It is our responsibility not only to do everything we can do to perfect the patent system in the United States ... and we must also actively educate the world that it is fundamentally the best system.

I'm a pure capitalist, I believe in markets. I think treating intellectual property and patents, and trademarks and copyrights, as property will bring more efficiency and more innovation. ... [T]here are great ideas that people have patented. They're not necessarily the best people to manufacture or develop that idea, but they can sell that idea to someone else.

Government offices
Preceded by James E. Rogan	Head of the United States Patent and Trademark Office; 2004–2009	Succeeded by David Kappos (acting until August 2009: John J. Doll)
