= Office of Independent Inventor Programs =

Department of the US Patent and Trademark Office

The Office of Independent Inventor Programs (OIIP) was a department of the United States Patent and Trademark Office established in March 1999. Its stated purpose was to "establish new mechanisms to better disseminate information about the patent and trademark processes" and to facilitate communication between the USPTO and independent inventors through educational and outreach programs. By November 2003, the OIIP and the Patent Assistance Center had become part of the USPTO's Inventors Assistance Center. During its existence, the OIIP was headed first by Donald Grant Kelly, then by Richard J. Apley, and finally by John Calvert.

In October 1999, the USPTO began an advertising campaign to promote the OIIP while warning independent inventors of patent scams, out of which arose the Invention Submission Corporation v. Rogan legal case.
