= Kathi Vidal =

American lawyer (born 1968)

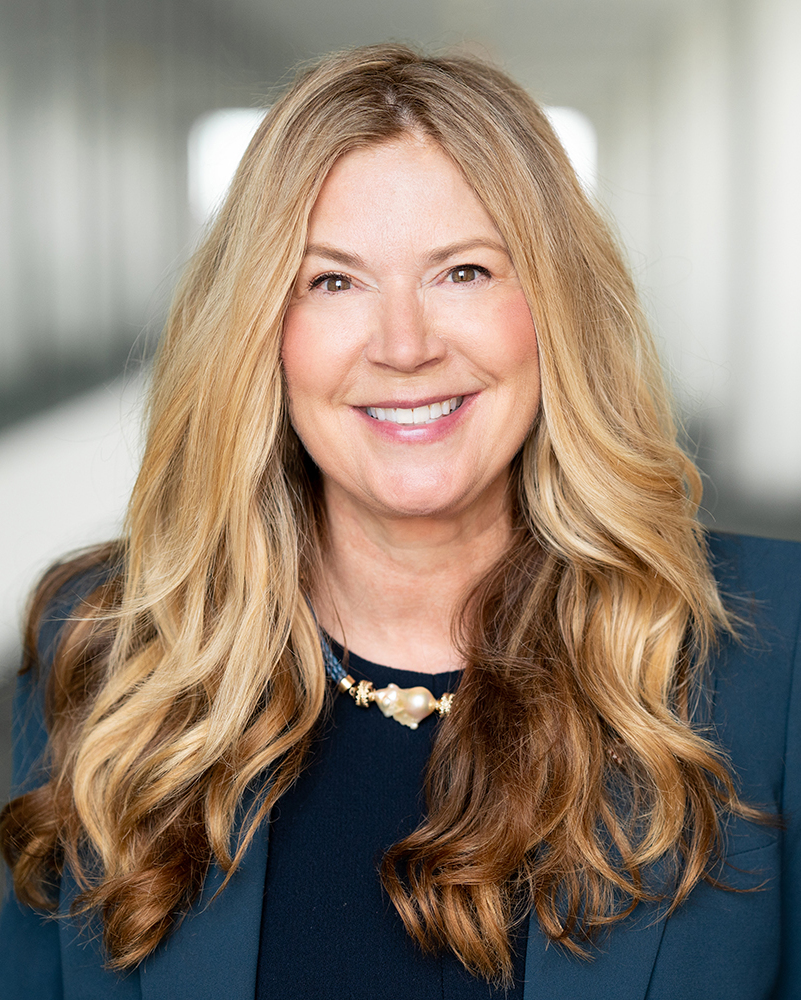
- Vidal in 2022

Under Secretary of Commerce for Intellectual Property
- In office April 19, 2022 – December 16, 2024
- President: Joe Biden
- Preceded by: Andrei Iancu
- Succeeded by: John A. Squires

Director of the United States Patent and Trademark Office
- In office April 19, 2022 – December 16, 2024
- President: Joe Biden
- Preceded by: Andrei Iancu
- Succeeded by: John A. Squires

Personal details
- Born: Katherine Antoinette Kelly; 1968 (age 57–58) Bethesda, Maryland, U.S.
- Education: Binghamton University (BS); Syracuse University (MS); University of Pennsylvania (JD)

Katherine "Kathi" Kelly Vidal (born 1968) is an American intellectual property lawyer and former engineer who served as Under Secretary of Commerce for Intellectual Property and Director of the United States Patent and Trademark Office USPTO) from 2022 to 2024.

== Education ==
Vidal earned a Bachelor of Science in electrical engineering from Binghamton University, a Master of Science in electrical engineering from Syracuse University, and a Juris Doctor from the University of Pennsylvania Law School.

== Career ==
Vidal began her career as an engineer for General Electric and Lockheed Martin, working in the areas of artificial intelligence, software engineering, and circuitry. From 1996 to 1997, she served as a law clerk for Judge Alvin Anthony Schall of the United States Court of Appeals for the Federal Circuit. From 1997 to 2017, she was a litigator at Fish & Richardson. From April 2017 to April 2022, she was the Silicon Valley managing partner and patent litigator at Winston & Strawn.

=== USPTO ===
On October 26, 2021, President Joe Biden nominated Vidal to be the next Under Secretary of Commerce for Intellectual Property and Director of the United States Patent and Trademark Office (USPTO). On December 1, 2021, a hearing on her nomination was held before the Senate Judiciary Committee. On January 13, 2022, her nomination was reported out of committee by a 17–5 vote. On April 5, 2022, the United States Senate confirmed Vidal by voice vote. She was sworn in as the director of the USPTO on April 13, 2022, and was sworn in as under secretary on April 19, 2022.

On December 13, 2024, Vidal left the USPTO and rejoined the Winston & Strawn law firm.

Government offices
Preceded by Andrei Iancu	Head of the United States Patent and Trademark Office; April 19, 2022 - December 16, 2024	Succeeded by John A. Squires
