= International Intellectual Property Institute =

Think tank and advocacy organization

The International Intellectual Property Institute (IIPI) is a not-for-profit 501(c)(3) corporation founded in 1999 and located in Washington, DC. An international advocacy organization and think tank, IIPI is dedicated to increasing awareness and understanding of the use of intellectual property as a tool for economic growth, particularly in developing countries.

Bruce A. Lehman, who served as Assistant Secretary of Commerce and U.S. Commissioner of Patents and Trademarks from August 1993 through December 1998, is Chairman and President of IIPI.

== History ==
IIPI works to establish constituencies of policymakers, business leaders and judicial stakeholders in the developing world who understand that effective, enforceable intellectual property rights - patents, copyrights and trademarks, trade secrets, industrial designs, etc. - are a valuable tool in the promotion of economic development in their own countries.

Through the support of private corporations, the United States and foreign governments and other international development organizations, IIPI works to increase the capacity of human intellectual assets and creativity in an effort to fuel economic growth and improve standards of living.

== See also ==
- Intellectual Property Organization
