= Teresa Stanek Rea =

American government official

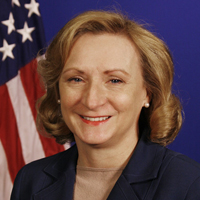

Under Secretary of Commerce for Intellectual Property Acting Director of the United States Patent and Trademark Office (acting)
- In office February 1, 2013 – November 21, 2013
- Preceded by: David J. Kappos
- Succeeded by: Michelle K. Lee

Personal details
- Education: University of Michigan

Teresa Stanek Rea is the former Acting Under Secretary of Commerce for Intellectual Property and former Acting Director of the United States Patent and Trademark Office (USPTO).

Rea obtained her Bachelor of Science degree in pharmacy in 1976 from the University of Michigan, and her Juris Doctor degree in 1980 from Wayne State University.

She has been a licensed pharmacist in the state of Michigan since 1976 and worked for a time as a hospital pharmacist. She worked for Ethyl Corporation from 1980 to 1984 and practiced patent law with the law firms of Crowell & Moring in Washington, D.C., and Burns, Doane, Swecker & Mathis in Alexandria, Virginia.

On February 17, 2011, she was appointed to the USPTO as Deputy Director by U.S. Secretary of Commerce Gary Locke. She assumed the dual roles of Acting Undersecretary and Acting Director after the resignation of David Kappos on February 1, 2013.

Rea resigned from the USPTO on November 21, 2013. Upon Rea's resignation, Commissioner for Patents Margaret A. (Peggy) Focarino began performing the functions and duties of the Under Secretary/Director and Deputy Under Secretary/Deputy Director of the USPTO until Michelle K. Lee took office on March 12, 2015.

Government offices
Preceded by David Kappos	Head of the United States Patent and Trademark Office; February 1, 2013 - November 21, 2013	Succeeded by Margaret A. (Peggy) Focarino
