= David Kappos =

Director of the US Patent office

David J. Kappos
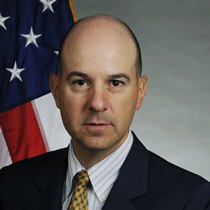

Under Secretary of Commerce for Intellectual Property Director of the United States Patent and Trademark Office
- In office August 13, 2009 – February 1, 2013
- President: Barack Obama
- Preceded by: Jon Dudas
- Succeeded by: Teresa Stanek Rea (Acting)

Personal details
- Born: David James Kappos; March 3, 1961 (age 65) Palos Verdes, California
- Spouse: Leslie Kappos
- Education: University of California, Davis (B.S.); UC Berkeley School of Law (J.D.)

David "Dave" James Kappos (born March 3, 1961) is an attorney and former government official who served as Under Secretary of Commerce for Intellectual Property and Director of the United States Patent and Trademark Office (USPTO) from 2009 to 2013. Kappos is currently a partner at New York law firm Cravath, Swaine & Moore.

Prior to being confirmed to the post by the U.S. Senate on August 7, 2009, Kappos was the vice president and assistant general counsel, intellectual property law, for IBM Corporation. Kappos announced his intent to step down from the position in late January 2013. His final day in office was February 1, 2013. He was succeeded by Teresa Stanek Rea as Acting Under Secretary and Acting Director.

== Early life and education ==
Kappos was born March 3, 1961, in Palos Verdes, California. He is the grandson of immigrants from Greece. Kappos received his Bachelor of Science in electrical and computer engineering from the University of California, Davis in 1983, and his Juris Doctor degree from the University of California, Berkeley in 1990.

== Career ==
=== IBM career ===
He joined IBM in 1983 as a development engineer and has served in a variety of roles before taking his last position at IBM, including intellectual property law attorney in IBM's Storage Division and Litigation group, IP Law Counsel in IBM's Software Group, assistant general counsel for IBM Asia/Pacific, IBM Corporate Counsel and assistant general counsel.

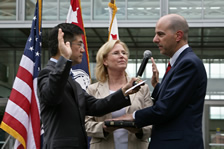
David Kappos (right) being sworn in as Under Secretary of Commerce for Intellectual Property and USPTO Director by Secretary of Commerce Gary Locke, as Kappos's wife, Leslie, holds the Bible, August 13, 2009.

=== USPTO tenure ===
Kappos became Under Secretary of Commerce for Intellectual Property and USPTO Director in August 2009. In this capacity, he was a chief negotiator in the passage and implementation of the Leahy-Smith America Invents Act; signed into law by President Barack Obama in September 2011. The legislation represents the most significant legislative change to the U.S. patent system since the Patent Act of 1952.

During his tenure, the USPTO's backlog dropped from over 770,000 to under 668,500 between 2009 and 2012. In November 2012, it was reported that Kappos intended to retire from the role in 2013, and he left office on February 1, 2013.

=== Post-USPTO career ===
After leaving the USPTO, Kappos joined the law firm of Cravath, Swaine & Moore, where he advises clients on intellectual property matters relating to corporate mergers and acquisitions, litigation and fintech. He is also an adjunct professor of copyright litigation at Columbia Law School, and of legal advising for start up general counsel at Cornell Law School.

== Recognition ==
In 2016, he was named one of the “Top 25 Icons of IP” by Law360. In 2014, he was listed as one of The National Law Journal's inaugural “Top 50 Intellectual Property Trailblazers & Pioneers”. Kappos was inducted into the Intellectual Property Hall of Fame by Intellectual Asset Management magazine in 2012. He serves on the boards of directors of the Partnership for Public Service, the Center for Global Enterprise and the Intellectual Property Owners Education Foundation. Kappos is also the chair of the Advisory Council of the Naples Roundtable and the chair of the U.S.-China IP Cooperation Dialogue.

== Further reading and listening ==
- Rick Merritt, IBM exec picked to head patent office, EE Times, June 18, 2009.
- Dennis Crouch, David Kappos: Next USPTO Director, Patently-O blog, June 18, 2009.
- Mr. David Kappos, Biography (UNC Symposium for Intellectual Property, Creativity, and the Innovation Process)
- William New, USPTO Nominee Kappos Appears To Clear First Senate Hurdle, Intellectual Property Watch, 29 July 2009
- United States Senate Committee on the Judiciary, Hearing of David J. Kappos, July 29, 2009.
- Kappos, David J.; John R. Thomas; Randall J. Bluestone (2008). "A Technological Contribution Requirement for Patentable Subject Matter: Supreme Court Precedent and Policy". Northwestern Journal of Technology and Intellectual Property. 6 (2): 152–170. Archived from the original on 2009-02-16.
- Lee, Timothy B. (November 20, 2012). "US patent chief to software patent critics: "Give it a rest already"". Ars Technica.

Government offices
Preceded by Jon Dudas (Acting since January 2009: John J. Doll)	Head of the United States Patent and Trademark Office; July 29, 2009 - February 1, 2013	Succeeded by Teresa Stanek Rea (Acting February 2013 - November 2013)
