= John J. Doll =

John J. Doll (September 8, 1948 – May 20, 2021) was the former Acting United States Under Secretary of Commerce for Intellectual Property and Acting director of the United States Patent and Trademark Office (USPTO) due to the resignation of Jon W. Dudas on January 20, 2009. Before that, Doll was Commissioner for Patents at the USPTO. He joined the Patent and Trademark Office in 1974.

Doll retired from the USPTO in 2009. After leaving the USPTO, he became a patent consultant, working as an expert witness in patent matters.

Government offices
Preceded by Jon Dudas	Head of the United States Patent and Trademark Office (acting); January 2009 - August 2009	Succeeded by David Kappos
