= Confederate Patent Office =

Agency of the Confederate States of America

Confederate States of America Patent Office
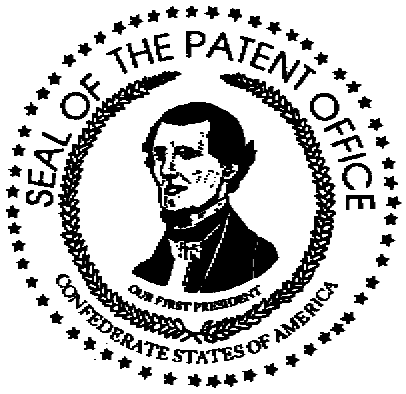
- Seal of the Confederate States of America Patent Office

Agency overview
- Formed: January 23, 1862
- Dissolved: May 5, 1865
- Jurisdiction: Confederate States of America
- Headquarters: Richmond, Virginia
- Agency executives: Rufus Randolph Rhodes, Commissioner; Owen McGarr, Chief Clerk

The Confederate Patent Office was the agency of the Confederate States of America charged with issuing patents on inventions. The Commissioner during its entire existence was Rufus Randolph Rhodes of Mississippi who resigned his post at the United States Patent Office after the election of Abraham Lincoln.

The Confederate Patent Office is known to have issued 266 patents, and likely it issued some more during the early months of 1865. Unfortunately, the records it contained were destroyed in a fire. Very few patent documents issued by the CPO, likely fewer than 10, are known to survive.

The first patent was issued to James H. Van Houten of Savannah, Georgia, on August 1, 1861, for a "breech-loading gun".

One of the more well-known Confederate patents (at least based on the results) was Patent No. 100, granted to John Mercer Brooke for the design of the Confederate ironclad ship Merrimack, more properly known as the CSS Virginia.

Confederate States Patent No. 60

Confederate States Patent #60 was granted to Jacob B. and William L. Platt of Augusta, Georgia on January 7, 1862, for "Camp Cots."
