= John D. Craig (Superintendent of Patents) =

John D. Craig (1766 – January 25, 1846) was third Superintendent of Patents of the United States, serving from June 11, 1829, to February 1, 1835.

== Biography ==
Born in Ireland, he taught at the Baltimore Union School, and in 1828 led the founding of the Ohio Mechanics Institute of Cincinnati, which became the College of Engineering and Applied Science of the University of Cincinnati. On June 10, 1829, United States Secretary of State Martin Van Buren transferred Patent Office Superintendent Thomas Jones to another position in the State Department, and appointed Craig as Superintendent of Patents the following day.

Patent historian Kenneth W. Dobyns noted that Craig accomplished a great deal in office, but "he was arrogant, subject to rages, disagreeable to patent applicants and their agents, and a domineering tyrant toward the subordinate employees in the Patent Office". Shortly after taking office, Craig began investigating the office's finances, finding a $4,000 shortage, though his investigation found no evidence of embezzlement. Unlike his predecessors, Craig did not read the specifications of patent applications, believing that under the operative 1793 statute, a patent should issue upon payment of fees for the patent application even if its contents were nonsense. He felt that the Act of 1793 intended that the courts should sort out patent rights in a dispute.

Craig was "the first to make an orderly and systematic classification and arrangement of the models and drawings, corresponding to the nature of the subject to which they belonged", and was thereby instrumental in establishing the patent classification system. He was the leading proponent of using patent office revenues to fund construction of a new facility, although this facility would not be built until after his tenure. Craig was dismissed from office in February 1935 following an investigation stemming from his hiring of a former student as a clerk, who was also allowed to engage in the business of preparing drawings for patent applicants outside of office hours, in competition with another person who had been given permission by the secretary of state to work in that capacity.

Craig died in Philadelphia, Pennsylvania, at the age of 80.

== Attribution ==
Content on this page has been adapted from the United States Patent and trademark office biography of John D. Craig, a source in the public domain.
