= Andrei Iancu =

Romanian-American engineer and attorney (born 1968)

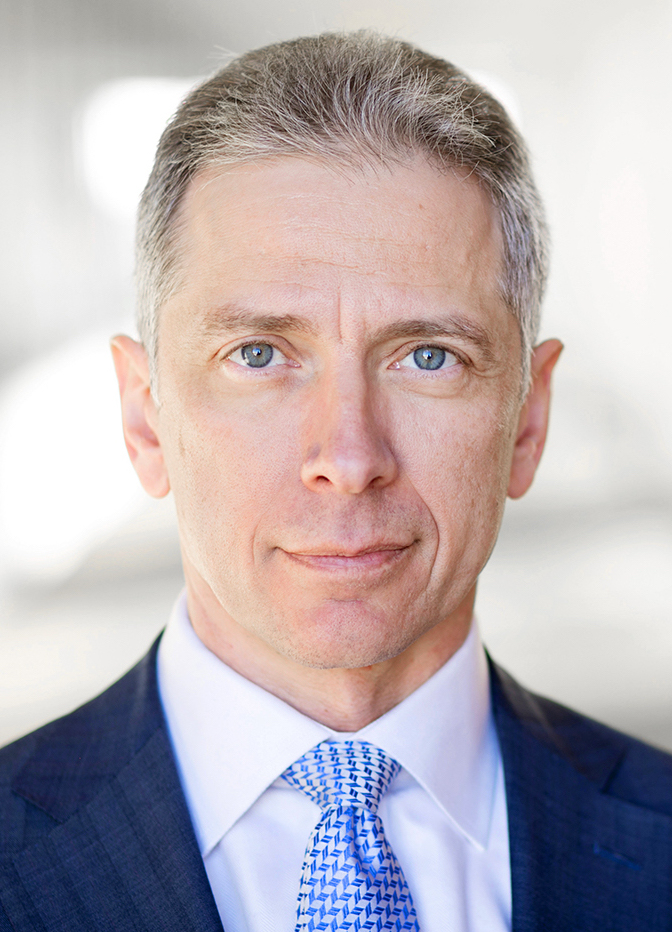

Under Secretary of Commerce for Intellectual Property
- In office February 8, 2018 – January 20, 2021
- President: Donald Trump
- Preceded by: Michelle K. Lee
- Succeeded by: Kathi Vidal

Director of the United States Patent and Trademark Office
- In office February 8, 2018 – January 20, 2021
- President: Donald Trump
- Preceded by: Michelle K. Lee
- Succeeded by: Kathi Vidal

Personal details
- Born: April 2, 1968 (age 58) Bucharest, Romania
- Spouse: Dr. Luiza Cecilia Iancu
- Children: 2
- Education: University of California, Los Angeles (BS, MS, JD)

Andrei Iancu (born April 2, 1968) is a Romanian-American engineer and intellectual property attorney, who served as the under secretary of commerce for intellectual property and director of the United States Patent and Trademark Office (USPTO) from 2017 to 2021. He was nominated for both positions in 2017 by President Donald Trump. He left office on January 20, 2021. He is currently a partner in Sullivan & Cromwell's intellectual property & technology practice.

== Early life and education ==
Iancu was born in Bucharest to Leon and Inda Iancu. He emigrated to America with his family in 1981 at age 13, settling in Los Angeles. He earned a Bachelor of Science degree in aerospace engineering in 1989, a Master of Science in mechanical engineering in 1990, and a Juris Doctor in 1996, all from the University of California, Los Angeles. At UCLA, he was initiated into Sigma Pi fraternity.

== Career ==
Before entering law school, Iancu was an engineer at Hughes Aircraft, from 1989 to 1993.

Following law school, Iancu joined Irell & Manella as an associate in 1999 and was later promoted to partnership. He was elected managing partner for two terms from 2012 to 2018.

His legal practice focused on intellectual property litigation. As an attorney, Iancu appeared before the United States Patent and Trademark Office, the United States International Trade Commission, U.S. district courts, and the United States Court of Appeals for the Federal Circuit.

In 2006, while Iancu was a partner at Irell & Manella, the firm represented Donald Trump, NBC Universal and Mark Burnett in a copyright suit which alleged that Mark Bethea and Velocity Entertainment Group had originally pitched The Apprentice to the production team, under the title of CEO. The case was "jointly settled out of court with an undisclosed settlement paid to Bethea" that year.

Iancu is also a lecturer of patent law at his alma mater, the UCLA School of Law.

=== USPTO ===
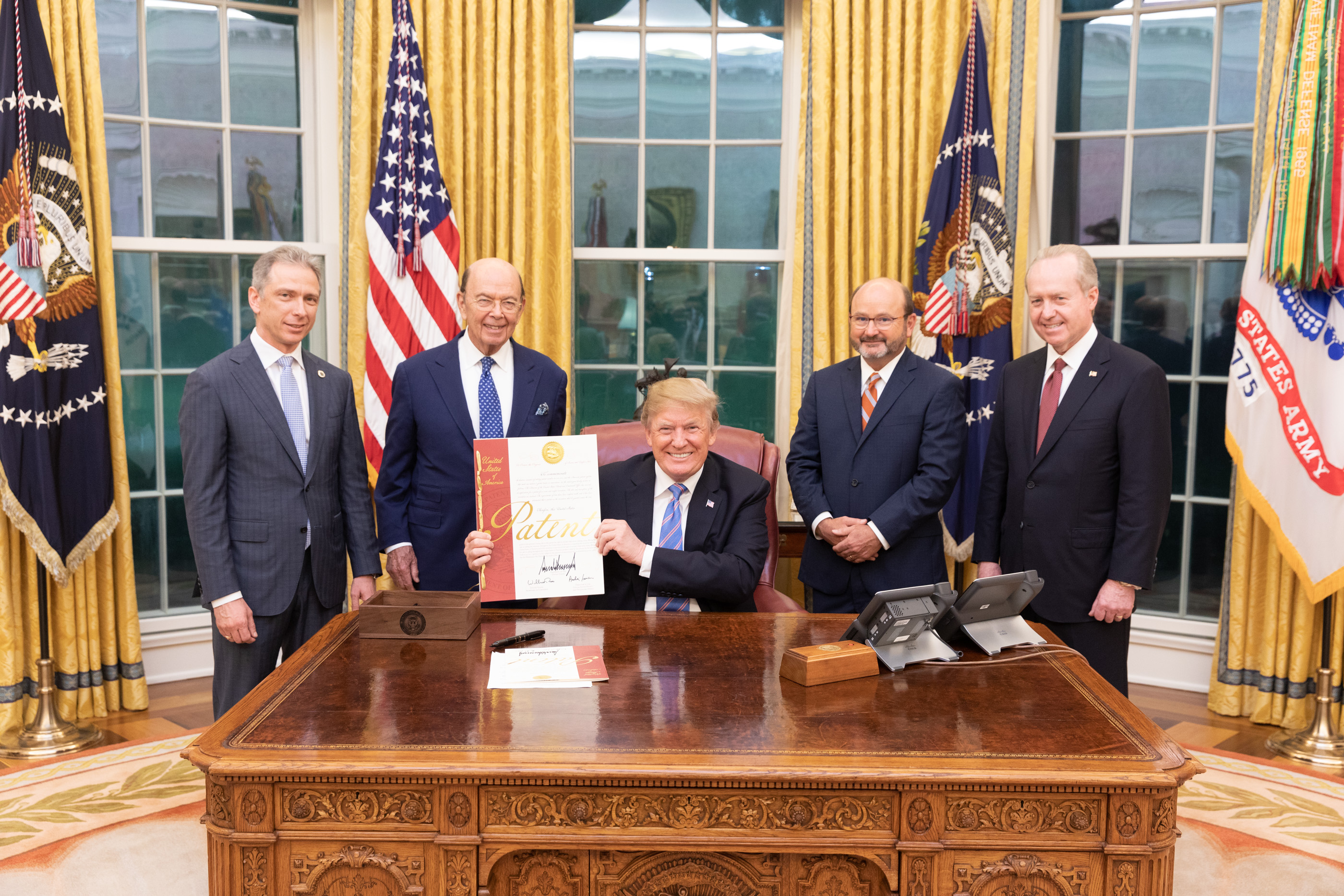
Iancu with President Donald Trump and Wilbur Ross during the signing of the ten millionth patent

Iancu was nominated by President Trump on August 26, 2017. A hearing on his nomination was held on November 29, 2017. His nomination was approved by the Senate Judiciary Committee on December 14, 2017 by a voice vote. He was confirmed by the Senate on February 5, 2018 by a 94–0 vote. He assumed the offices of Under Secretary and Director on February 8, 2018, when he was sworn in.

In 2020, Iancu was in office during the sharpest declines and inclines of trademark applications in history. COVID-19 lockdowns led to fewer filings in the beginning of the year, which then increased in July 2020, exceeding the previous July. September 2020 was subsequently the highest month of trademark filings in the history of the U.S. Patent and Trademark Office.

=== Return to private practice ===
Iancu returned to Irell & Manella as a partner on April 1, 2021, with his practice focused on intellectual property litigation and counseling. Three months later in July 2021, Irell & Manella announced the launch of its Washington, D.C. office, with Iancu at the helm. In April 2022, retired former Federal Circuit judge Kathleen M. O'Malley joined his office in D.C., and a year later in July 2023, Sullivan & Cromwell announced that Iancu had moved to the firm along with Judge O'Malley.

== Personal ==
Iancu is married to his wife Dr. Luiza Cecilia Iancu, a fellow Romanian-American immigrant. They have two children, Ariella Magen Iancu and Robert Gabriel Iancu. He is based in Los Angeles and maintains an office in D.C.

Government offices
Preceded by Michelle K. Lee	Director of the United States Patent and Trademark Office	Succeeded by Kathi Vidal
Political offices
Preceded by Michelle K. Lee	Under Secretary of Commerce for Intellectual Property	Succeeded by Kathi Vidal
