= Michelle K. Lee =

American attorney and former director of USPTO

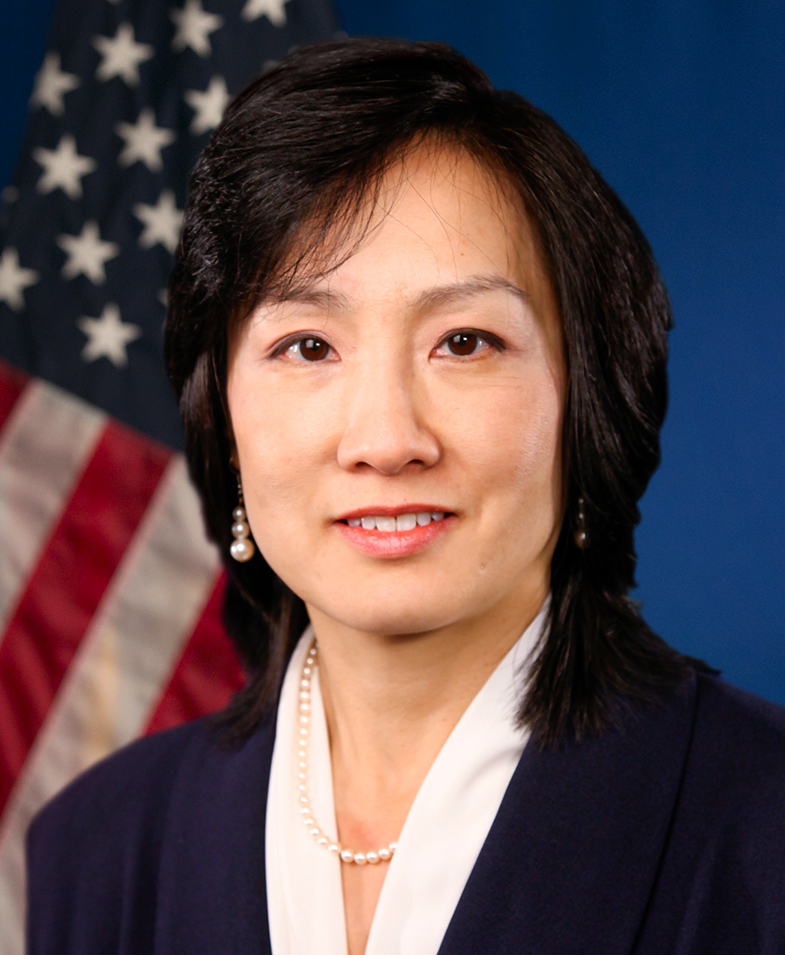
- Lee's official USPTO headshot

Under Secretary of Commerce for Intellectual Property
- In office March 12, 2015 – June 6, 2017
- President: Barack Obama; Donald Trump
- Deputy: Russell Slifer
- Preceded by: Teresa Stanek Rea
- Succeeded by: Andrei Iancu

Director of the United States Patent and Trademark Office
- In office January 13, 2014 – June 6, 2017
- Deputy: Russell Slifer
- Preceded by: Teresa Stanek Rea
- Succeeded by: Andrei Iancu

Personal details
- Born: 1965 (age 60–61) Santa Clara, California, US

Michelle Kwok Lee, born 1965 in Santa Clara, California, was a former Under Secretary of Commerce for Intellectual Property and Director of the United States Patent and Trademark Office (USPTO).

== Childhood and education ==
Michelle Lee built her own television as a child. During her senate confirmation hearing, Lee testified that she was first exposed to technology and innovation when she built a Heathkit radio with her father. Her family is of Chinese descent.

Lee simultaneously obtained a B.S. in electrical engineering and an M.S. in electrical engineering and computer science from the Massachusetts Institute of Technology (MIT) in 1989; her master's thesis was on qualitative behavior of nonlinear circuits. She obtained her Juris Doctor from Stanford University School of Law in 1992.

== Career ==
Before her legal career, Lee worked as a computer scientist at Hewlett-Packard Research Laboratories and at MIT's Artificial Intelligence Laboratory.

=== Attorney ===
She was admitted to practice law in California in 1992, and is a registered US patent attorney. Lee served as a clerk for federal judges Vaughn Walker of the U.S. District Court for the Northern District of California and Paul Redmond Michel of the U.S. Court of Appeals for the Federal Circuit.

Prior to joining the USPTO, she was an attorney with the law firm of Keker & Van Nest from 1994 to 1996, when she joined Fenwick & West, where she later became a partner, before joining Google in 2003. Lee was deputy general counsel and head of patents and patent strategy at Google from 2003 to 2012. While at Google, she co-founded Chief IP Counsels (ChIPs), a networking organization for female patent attorneys.

=== USPTO ===
Lee's first position with the USPTO was as Director of its Silicon Valley satellite office. She was appointed Deputy Under Secretary of Commerce for Intellectual Property and deputy director on January 13, 2014.

In October 2014, President Barack Obama announced that he intended to nominate Lee to the office of Under Secretary of Commerce for Intellectual Property, heading the USPTO on a permanent basis. Obama officially nominated Lee on November 11, and her initial confirmation hearing was held December 10. However, Congress adjourned without her confirmation, and the nomination was returned to the President on December 17.

Following Senate rules, in order for Lee to be confirmed; Obama re-nominated her to the Senate of the 114th Congress, and he did so on January 8, 2015. Her second confirmation hearing was held January 21, and the Senate Judiciary Committee voted unanimously in favor of her confirmation on February 26.

Lee was confirmed by the full Senate by voice vote on March 9, 2015, and took the oath of office on March 12, when she was sworn in by Secretary of Commerce Penny Pritzker at the South by Southwest festival in Austin, Texas.

Lee resigned from the USPTO on June 6, 2017. Upon Lee's resignation, USPTO Associate Solicitor Joseph Matal began performing the functions and duties of the Under Secretary of Commerce for Intellectual Property and Director of the United States Patent and Trademark Office until Andrei Iancu was sworn in.

=== Private enterprise ===
In September 2019, Lee joined Amazon Web Services as Vice President of Machine Learning Solutions Lab. In May 2020, MIT Corporation, the governing board of trustees of Lee's alma mater, elected Lee as a term member (2020–2025). In November 2021, Lee was elected to MassMutual's board of directors. In March 2022, Unity Technologies appointed Lee to its board of directors. Lee is currently the Founder, CEO and Principal Advisor of Obsidian Strategies, Inc.

Government offices
Preceded by Teresa Stanek Rea	Director of the United States Patent and Trademark Office; 2014–2017	Succeeded by Andrei Iancu
