= Bruce Lehman =

American activist (born 1945)

Bruce A. Lehman (born September 19, 1945) served from 1993 to 1998 as Assistant Secretary of Commerce and Commissioner of the United States Patent and Trademark Office (USPTO). Lehman is noted for being the first openly gay man to be confirmed by the U.S. Senate.

Nominated by President Bill Clinton on April 23, 1993, he was confirmed by the United States Senate on August 5, 1993. During this short period of time, he was responsible for significant changes to the United States patent law.

After leaving the USPTO, Lehman founded the International Intellectual Property Institute, a non-profit, non-governmental organization. In 2014 he was appointed by the Secretary General of the United Nations to serve on the High Level Panel on the Feasibility of a Technology Bank for Least Developed Nations. The panel submitted its report to Secretary-General Ban Ki-moon and the United Nations General Assembly in September 2015.

== Biography ==
Lehman earned a B.A. in 1967 and a J.D. in 1970 from University of Wisconsin–Madison.

He was named "Lawyer of the Year" in 1994 by The National Law Journal.

In 1996, he served as the U.S. Trade Representative delegate to World Intellectual Property Organization (WIPO) on the December 1996 Diplomatic Conference on Certain Copyright and Neighboring Rights Questions.

He was appointed chairman of the Working Group on Intellectual Property Rights of the National Information Infrastructure Task Force for the Clinton administration and, on September 5, 1997, was appointed, on an interim basis, as acting chairman of the National Endowment for the Humanities. On June 16, 1997, he was named one of the 100 most influential men and women in Washington by the National Journal.

He has been legal counsel to the Wisconsin State Legislature; the United States House of Representatives, for nine years; and the Committee on the Judiciary and Subcommittee on Courts, Civil Liberties, and the Administration of Justice, in the drafting of the 1976 Copyright Act, the 1980 Computer Software Amendments, and 1982 amendments to the Patent Laws.

He has also worked as an attorney with the U.S. Department of Justice, as a partner at Swidler & Berlin, for 10 years; and as an officer in the U.S. Army. Lehman is currently a member of the Bar of the District of Columbia.

On February 7, 2006, Lehman was honored as one of 23 inaugural inductees to the newly created International IP Hall of Fame, a project sponsored by London-based Intellectual Asset Management magazine.

Lehman is president and chairman of the International Intellectual Property Institute (IIPI), a non-profit, non-partisan economic development organization based in Washington, D.C. He is also a member of the Legal Advisory Council of LegalZoom. Since 2015, Lehman has focused on advancing the cause of visual artists rights. He serves as an advisor to the Artists Rights Society of the United States and the Association of Medical Illustrators. In that capacity he has filed amicus briefs on behalf of numerous visual artists organizations with the U.S. appellate courts and the United States Supreme Court and has drafted legislation introduced by U.S. Representative Jerrold Nadler that would establish an artists resale royalty right in the U.S., patterned after similar legislation in over 70 countries. Lehman resides in Sarasota, Florida where he serves as a board member of the La Musica chamber music festival.

== See also ==
- Software patent
- Copyright
