= Rufus Randolph Rhodes =

American attorney

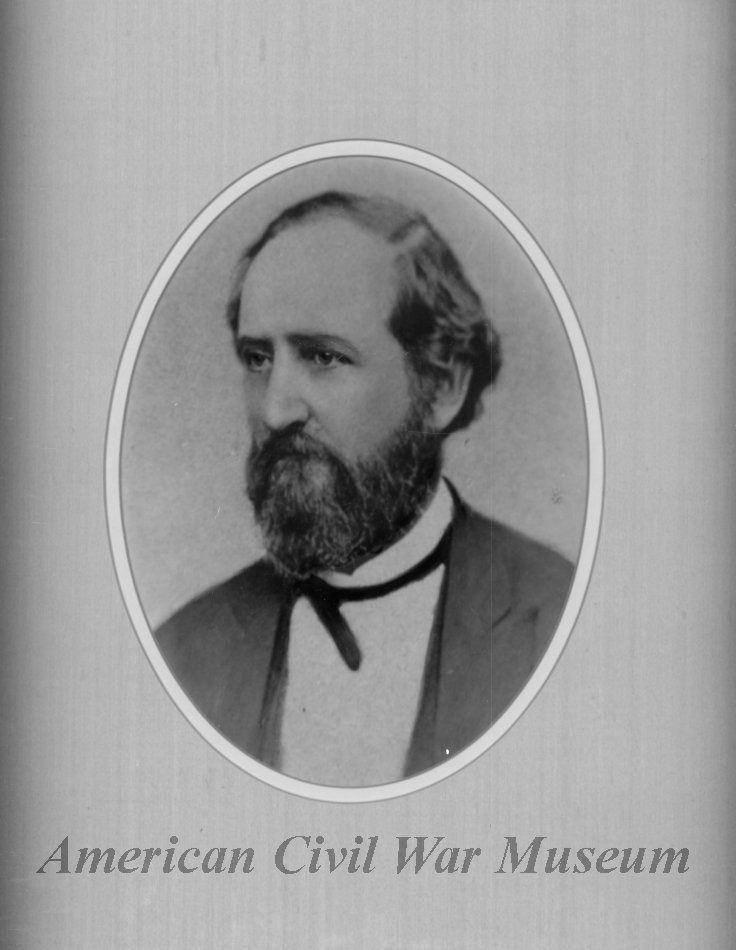
Rufus Randolph Rhodes, the only head of the Confederate Patent Office

Rufus Randolph Rhodes (1818 – 1870) was born in Wilcox County, Alabama. Rhodes spent most of his life as an attorney in Mississippi. After serving a tenure in the United States Patent Office in Washington, D.C., he was appointed as first and only Commissioner of Confederate States Patents from 1861 to 1865 based in Richmond, Virginia.

== Early life ==
Rufus Rhodes was the first child born to Capt. Thomas Rhodes and his third wife, Jemima Williamson Rhodes, in Wilcox County, Alabama. His father was a US government land surveyor for the Louisiana Purchase who had left his wife, children, and home in Terrebonne Parish, Louisiana, to survey recently ceded Indian lands in south Mississippi and south Alabama. While there, he met Jemima, the daughter of wealthy planter, George Williamson, and the two were married.

His father was captain of engineers for Andrew Jackson. While surveying he saw a business opportunity using the new technology of steamboats to get sugar to market, becoming a pioneering steamboat captain who was said to have operated the first steamboat on the Alabama River He also transported mail between New Orleans and Mobile. At an early age, Rufus moved with his family to Mobile, where Thomas Rhodes purchased a home prior to 1829. While in Mobile, Thomas Rhodes dabbled as an attorney, dealing mainly with estate settlements, but he began to set his sights on the richly timbered lands in nearby Jackson County, Mississippi.

The Rhodes family bought a summer house in East Pascagoula, Mississippi, in 1834. This site later became the site of the East Pascagoula Hotel opened there in 1836. The Rhodes family held a residence in Mobile, Alabama, but put down roots in Jackson County as early as 1840, and Rufus' father began operating a sawmill there. Rufus Rhodes later said that he had been a resident of Jackson County since about 1828.

== Marriages ==
Rufus Rhodes married Jane Myers in Jackson County, Mississippi on January 15, 1846. She was the daughter of William Myers, an early settler of Jackson County and inhabitant of Griffin Point in present-day Moss Point. Jane Rhodes died on March 19, 1852, aged 22 years, two months, and 13 days. Rufus and Jane Rhodes had two daughters.

Rufus married, second, Martha Anne Fisher in New Orleans, Louisiana on May 13, 1854. She was the daughter of Samuel Fisher, native of Newborne, North Carolina. They had a son Rufus Napoleon Rhodes who was the founder, editor and owner of the Birmingham News. and member of the Tennessee legislature from 1881 to 1882.

== Education and career ==
Rufus Rhodes was working as an attorney as early as 1846 when he applied for a position as District Attorney of Lauderdale County, Mississippi. He was listed as a lawyer in the 1850 Jackson County, Mississippi census and on Mississippi Law Registers of 1851, 1852, 1853, and 1856. In the January–February 1854 session of the Mississippi House of Representatives, Rufus served as a member-elect from Jackson County and brought forth ideas such as relinquishing a plot of land in Jackson County to the United States for the erection of a military asylum. He proposed the incorporation of Ocean Springs, Mississippi and connecting the Mississippi Gulf Coast by rail via New Orleans or Mobile. The latter passed in the later formation of the Gulf and Ship Island Railroad.

Rufus Rhodes' home at East Pascagoula, Mississippi was burned by an arsonist during the night of August 27, 1856. The family barely escaped alive, and Rhodes' infant, Rufus Napoleon Rhodes, was badly burned when an ember ignited his night gown. About this time, Rufus accepted a position as an examiner in the United States Patent office in Washington, D. C. and moved there with his family after June, 1857. Soon after, he gained a seat on the Patent Office's Board of Appeals.

Some idea of Rufus’ work in the patent office can be attained from a rejected appeal dated December 22, 1858, in which a report was written to the commissioner of patents and signed by the three board members, DeWitt C. Lawrence, Rufus R. Rhodes, and A. B. Little . The rejected patent was submitted by George B. Simpson for a patent of insulating telegraph wires by coating them with gutta percha. The application was rejected by the examiner on the grounds that the idea of coating telegraph wires with gutta percha was well known and had been in use in America, England, and France as early as 1839. Simpson objected, stating that he had first filed application for a patent on the idea in 1847. The objection being before the Board of Appeals, it came upon these three men to decide. Rufus Rhodes and his two counter-parts agreed that the idea had been in existence for many years prior to Simpson's initial claim, and they derived, further, that since Simpson had made no attempt to appeal since his first rejection in 1851, that the idea of insulating telegraph wires with gutta percha was now abandoned to the public. The Board of Appeals denied Simpson's claim to the idea and moved to recommend that the application be finally rejected. The Board of Appeal's recommendation was then forwarded to the Commissioner of Patents, J. Holt, who confirmed and rejected the application on February 2, 1859.

Rufus' nephew, Thomas Rhodes Duval, moved to Washington, D. C. to study law under Rhodes. He was enumerated on the 1860 Washginton, D. C. census with Rufus, Martha, their children, and a domestic servant named Nancy on June 12, 1860. At this time, Rufus was a Master Mason at Dawson's Lodge (#16) of the Grand Lodge of the District of Columbia. The family lived at 461 E Street North, after moving there from a boarding house on Louisiana Avenue in 1858. Its neighboring structure, 463 E Street North was described in 1859 as a four-story brick house with a back building, a bathroom, and gas [lighting] throughout. The home sat just four blocks east of Ford's Theater.

== Civil War ==
Abraham Lincoln won the presidential vote on November 6, 1860. Four days later, Rufus Rhodes wrote a letter from Washington, D.C., to Mississippi governor John J. Pettus, leaving no question as to where his loyalties lay.

"I cannot with my views hold office under a Republican President a single instance of time without a total sacrifice of my self-respect. To do it would involve not only a loss of my own self-respect, but brand me as a disgraced and dishonored man in the estimation of all for whose good opinion I am anxious, namely the Southern people. I regard the election of Lincoln as a verdict against the equality of the southern states on the part of the sectional majority of the north….” “Infatuated by a spell which love of the Union and a veneration for the works of our Father's hands cast over our own perceptions,” he wrote, “we have hitherto refused to see and hear, or, seeing and hearing, to take heed of the lurid glare which lighted up and the muttering thunder which resonated from the northern skies with increasing spread and volume….Not altogether unnaturally we permitted this Delilah by her blandishments to steal away our judgment and persuade us to cling to the fond delusion that a sense of justice and of the right only slumbered among the northern people and would yet be awakened to gladden us by renewed demonstrations of fraternity and affection as in bye gone days when our fathers lived, until lo! The Philistine hosts are upon us….”

Rufus concluded his letter to Governor Pettus with this offer: “Not doubting that all Mississippians entertain the views I have thus hastily expressed I must believe that Mississippi will secede from the Union….My object therefore in writing this is to tender through you her honored chief magistrate my humble services in that event in any sphere in which they can be of use.” In Washington D. C., forty-two year old Rufus Rhodes put his name to a letter, on November 15, 1860, that was being circulated amongst the friends of B. F. DeBow . DeBow sent the letter to the editor of the Charleston Mercury to show support to those friends there and elsewhere who were expressing “their opinions in regard to the incoming black republican administration.” The letter, to which Rufus and eighteen other signed, read “The undersigned, occupying offices under the Federal Government at Washington, deem that it is due to their Southern friends to say that under no circumstances will they consent to hold office under Abraham Lincoln.”

The Cleveland Leader of December 17, 1860, reported in disgust that Rufus R. Rhodes, a clerk in the Patent office had been approved six weeks of leave to visit Mississippi. Rhodes, a secessionist, was to continue receiving his $2,500.00 salary while taking concerting measures to break up the Union as a member of the Mississippi [secession] Convention. Some three weeks later, the Mississippi Convention in Jackson convened with a vote on January 9, 1861, that was in favor of secession and removal of the state of Mississippi from the Union. Rufus appears to have moved his family back to Mississippi during this time, as his son Samuel was born at [East] Pascagoula on February 6, 1861.

Confederate President Jefferson Davis, and a personal friend of Rhodes, appointed Rhodes as Commissioner of the Confederate States Patent Office in May 1861. The office was then in Montgomery, Alabama, but when the Confederate capital was moved to Richmond, Virginia, a month later, Rhodes traveled there to set up the new office. Rufus Rhodes opened his patent office in Richmond's former Customs House building, which was shared with the offices of the Confederate War Department and the office of the Attorney General. The Patent office was located in the south front room on the third floor, and large room in the rear of the office was used for exhibition of models of inventions. During the war, Rufus served on committees that raised relief for the wounded soldiers of Mississippi and for the relief and aid of the exiled citizens of New Orleans.

Of the exiled citizens of New Orleans, one was Rhodes' sister, Mrs. Theodore Duval, and her family and also his father-in-law, Samuel Fisher. Rhodes wrote a letter to Mississippi Governor John J. Pettus on March 12, 1863, on behalf of Mr. Fisher.

“My Dear Sir,” he began, “As an old friend I venture to invoke your services on behalf of my father-in-law Mr. Sam’l C. Fisher who is a fugitive from New Orleans where he resided and who is by the chance of war cut off from all of his resources. He has no funds or resources that he can now command and the necessity of procuring employment presses upon him with a sternness that admits of neither delay or escape. I ask you to find some employment for him as a favor I can never forget. You know well were our positions relatively the converse of what they are I would strain every nerve to serve a friend of yours, and I do not doubt that you will grant the favor I ask if it be within your powers. Mr. Fisher is an accomplished book keeper and business man generally and I am sure he would fill any place you might procure for him with ability. He desires to be as near to New Orleans as possible to increase the chances of occasionally hearing from his wife and children. His sons that are old enough to bear arms are in our army or already dead upon the field of Shiloh and hence he does not wish to come to Richmond where I could find a place for him. I take it that among all your kind friends I have troubled you as little if not less than any other and it appears to me therefore that I have some small right to ask you for this small favor." Rufus signed the letter, “Very faithfully & truly, your friend, Rufus R. Rhodes.”

As the war intensified, Rufus sent his wife Martha and their children to live at Cluster Springs, Virginia, away from the front lines. Rufus fled Richmond with the rest of the Confederate Government on April 2, 1865 ("Evacuation Sunday"). He was captured by Federal forces at Danville, Virginia, in May 1865 just as the war was drawing to a close.

== Post War ==
When the Civil War ended, Rufus signed an Oath of Allegiance to the United States on May 23, 1865, shortly after his capture at Danville. Due to his affiliation with the Confederate Government, Rhodes had to apply for amnesty and seek a presidential pardon. Rhodes went to Washington, D.C., and signed, on July 24, 1865, the oath prescribed by President Andrew Johnson's proclamation of May 29, 1865. While in Washington, Rhodes visited his old friend Charles Mason. The two had worked together in the Patent Office before the war. Mason wrote in his diary that day, "He [Rhodes] gives a sad account of the condition of things south." Rufus Rhodes received his pardon in September 1865.

Rhodes returned briefly to Jackson County, Mississippi, but then moved to New Orleans, Louisiana, to practice law prior to April 1866. In January 1867, he and fifteen other men in New Orleans were allowed to resume their law practices after taking the Constitutional Oath. Rufus settled in as a patent attorney on the third floor of 23 Commercial Place in New Orleans. He held this position until his death, or at least as late as the summer of 1869.

== Death ==
Rufus Rhodes died of a stroke in New Orleans, Louisiana, on November 16, 1870. Two weeks later, the Second District Judicial Court of Orleans Parish appointed Martha Rhodes, his widow, as executor to the estate. On December 5, 1870, all furniture and personal items belonging to Rufus at his 319 Second Street residence and his Commercial Place business office. The estate was valued at $8,830.30. Martha Rhodes moved her children to Clarksville, Tennessee, where she taught school for many years. Rufus Rhodes' son, Rufus Napoleon Rhodes, became the celebrated editor of the Birmingham Times.
