= United States Patent and Trademark Office =

National patent bureau

- Seal of the U.S. Patent and Trademark Office

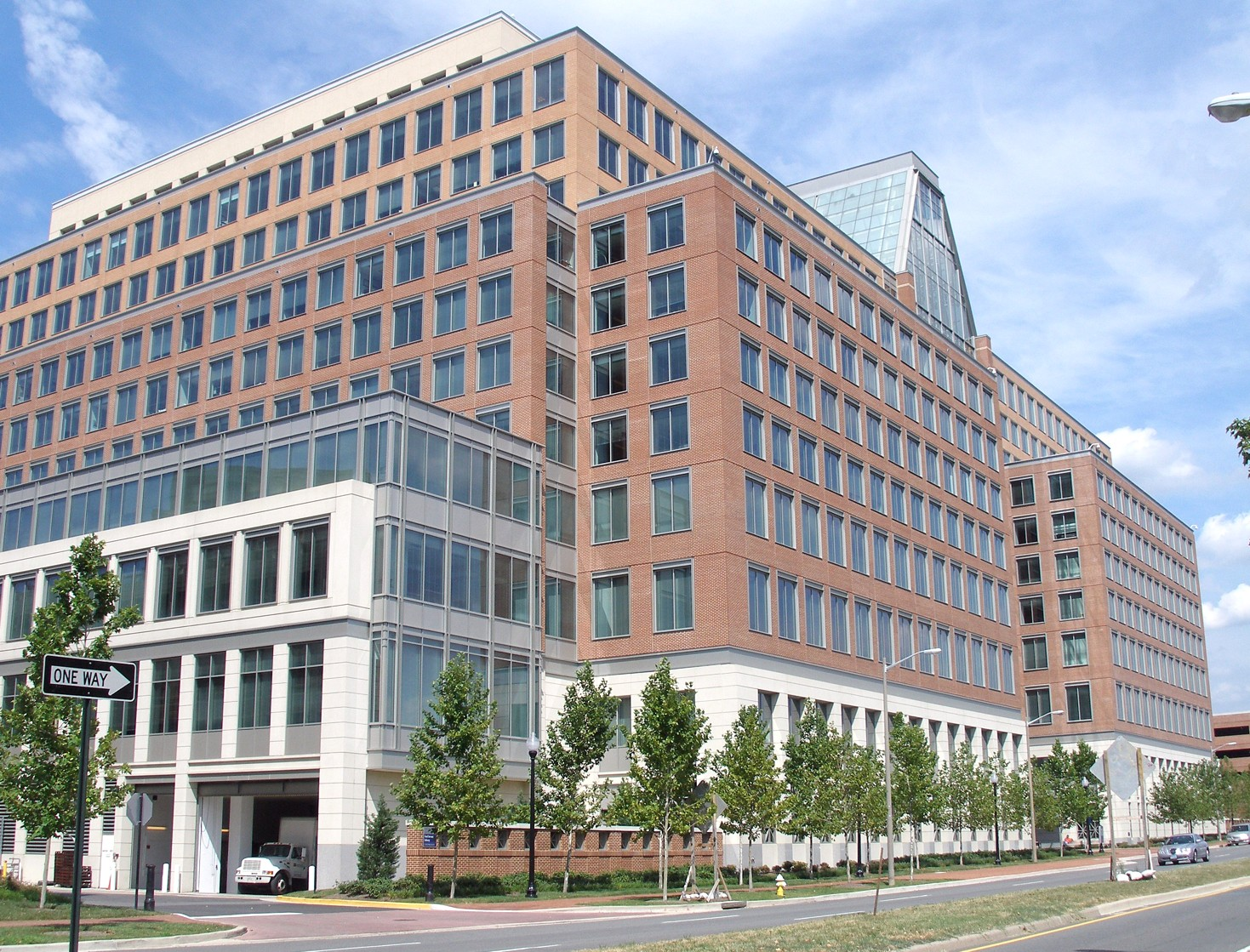
- The James Madison building on the campus of the United States Patent and Trademark Office headquarters in Alexandria. This is the largest building on the campus.

Agency overview
- Formed: July 4, 1836; 190 years ago Washington, D.C., U.S.
- Headquarters: Alexandria, Virginia, U.S.; 38.801499°N 77.063835°W
- Employees: 14,082 (2024)
- Agency executives: John A. Squires, Director; Coke Morgan Stewart, Deputy Director
- Parent agency: United States Department of Commerce
- Website: www.uspto.gov

The United States Patent and Trademark Office (USPTO) is an agency in the U.S. Department of Commerce that serves as the national patent office and trademark registration authority for the United States. The USPTO's headquarters are in Alexandria, Virginia, after a 2005 move from the Crystal City area of neighboring Arlington County, Virginia.

The USPTO is "unique among federal agencies because it operates solely on fees collected by its users, and not on taxpayer dollars". Its "operating structure is like a business in that it receives requests for services—applications for patents and trademark registrations—and charges fees projected to cover the cost of performing the services [it] provide[s]".

The office is headed by the under secretary of commerce for intellectual property and director of the United States Patent and Trademark Office. As of September 2025, John A. Squires is the undersecretary and director, having been confirmed by the U.S. Senate as part of an en bloc vote.

The USPTO cooperates with the European Patent Office (EPO) and the Japan Patent Office (JPO) as one of the Trilateral Patent Offices. The USPTO is also a Receiving Office, an International Searching Authority and an International Preliminary Examination Authority for international patent applications filed in accordance with the Patent Cooperation Treaty.

== Mission ==
The legal basis for the United States patent system is the Copyright Clause in Section 8 of Article I of the U.S. Constitution, which gives Congress the power to grant patents and copyrights on a national basis. Trademark law, on the other hand, is considered to be authorized by the Commerce Clause.

The Congress shall have Power ... To promote the Progress of Science and useful Arts, by securing for limited Times to Authors and Inventors the exclusive Right to their respective Writings and Discoveries.

The USPTO maintains a permanent, interdisciplinary historical record of all U.S. patent applications in order to fulfill objectives outlined in the United States Constitution. The PTO's mission is to promote "industrial and technological progress in the United States and strengthen the national economy" by:

- Administering the laws relating to patents and trademarks;
- Advising the secretary of commerce, the president of the United States, and the administration on patent, trademark, and copyright protection; and
- Providing advice on the trade-related aspects of intellectual property.
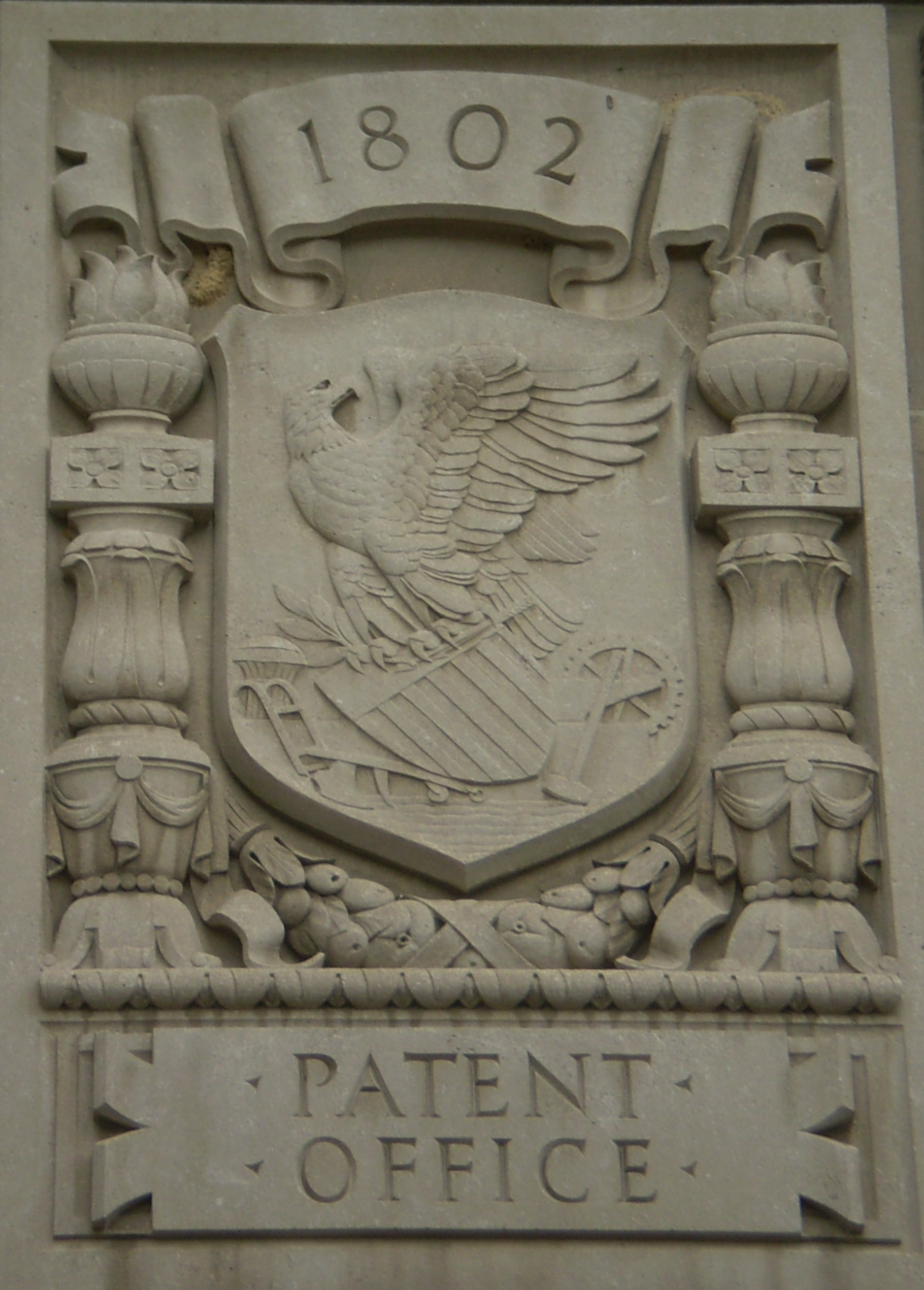
Relief representing the Patent Office at the Herbert C. Hoover Building

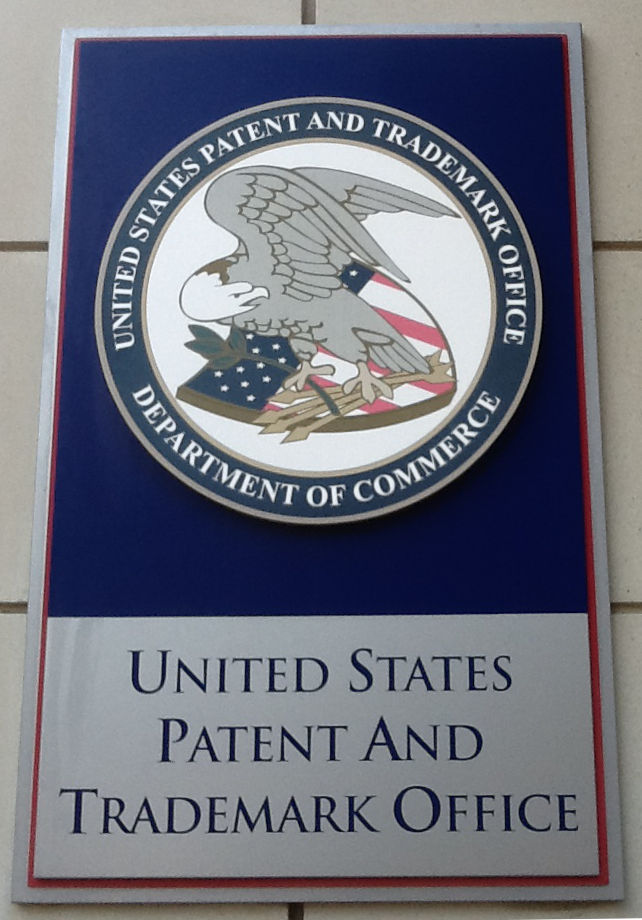
Signboard of U.S. Patent Office Alexandria

== Structure ==
The USPTO is headquartered at the Alexandria Campus, consisting of 4 buildings in a city-like development surrounded by ground floor retail and high rise residential buildings between the Metro stations of King Street station (the main search building is two blocks due south of the King Street station) and Eisenhower Avenue station where the actual Alexandria Campus is located between Duke Street (on the North) to Eisenhower Avenue (on the South), and between John Carlyle Street (on the East) to Elizabeth Lane (on the West) in Alexandria, Virginia.

The USPTO was expected by 2014 to open its first ever satellite offices in Detroit, Dallas, Denver, and Silicon Valley to reduce backlog and reflect regional industrial strengths. The first satellite office opened in Detroit on July 13, 2012. In 2013, due to the budget sequestration, the satellite office for Silicon Valley, which is home to one of the nation's top patent-producing cities, was put on hold. However, renovation and infrastructure updates continued after the sequestration, and the Silicon Valley location opened in the San Jose City Hall in 2015.

In 2024, the USPTO reduced its leased space in Alexandria, pointing to its increasingly remote work force and cost savings initiatives. The Alexandria campus no longer includes the Remsen and Randolph buildings, nor the Elizabeth Townhouse and West Garage. In November 2025, the U.S. General Services Administration and U.S. National Science Foundation (NSF) announced the new NSF headquarters will be located at the Randolph building that the USPTO has vacated.

On October 1, 2025, the USPTO announced plans to close the Rocky Mountain Regional Outreach Office in Denver.

As of September 30, 2009, the end of the U.S. government's fiscal year, the PTO had 9,716 employees, nearly all of whom are based at its five-building headquarters complex in Alexandria. Of those, 6,242 were patent examiners (almost all of whom were assigned to examine utility patents; only 99 were assigned to examine design patents) and 388 were trademark examining attorneys; the rest are support staff. While the agency has noticeably grown in recent years, the rate of growth was far slower in fiscal 2009 than in the recent past; this is borne out by data from fiscal 2005 to the present: As of the end of FY 2018, the USPTO was composed of 12,579 federal employees, including 8,185 patent examiners, 579 trademark examiners, and 3,815 other staff.

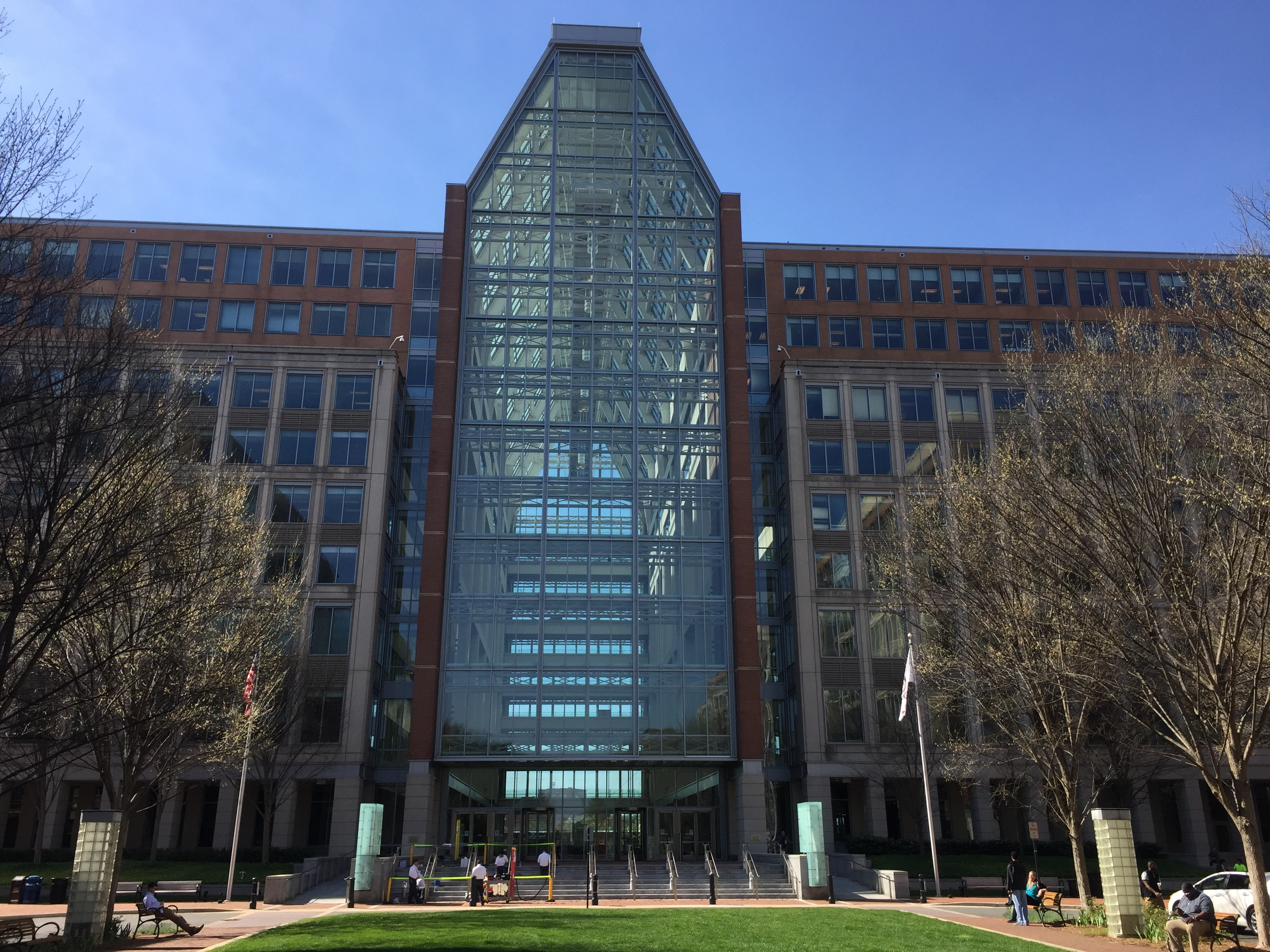
USPTO Madison Building Exterior

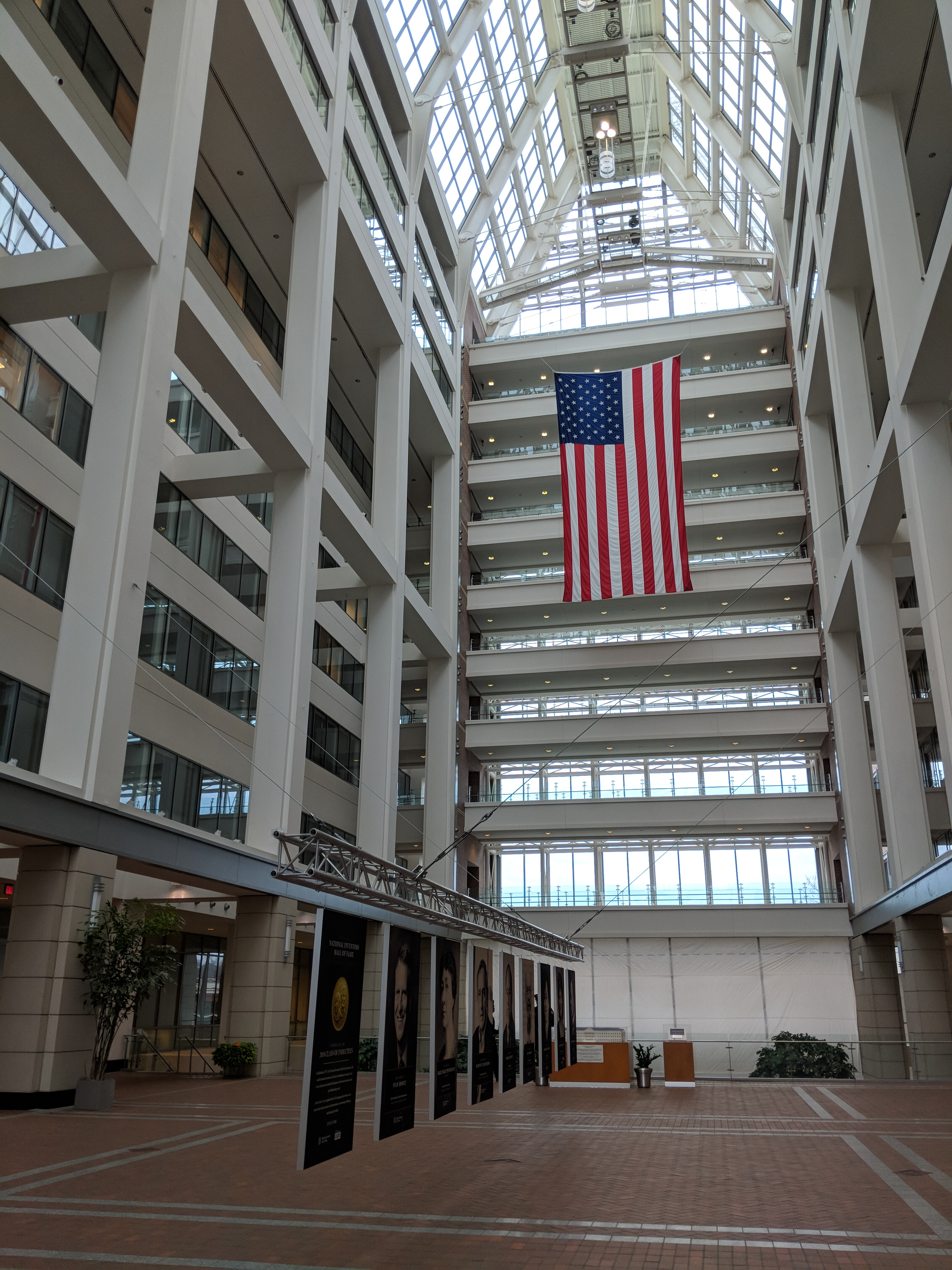
Interior atrium of the USPTO Madison Building

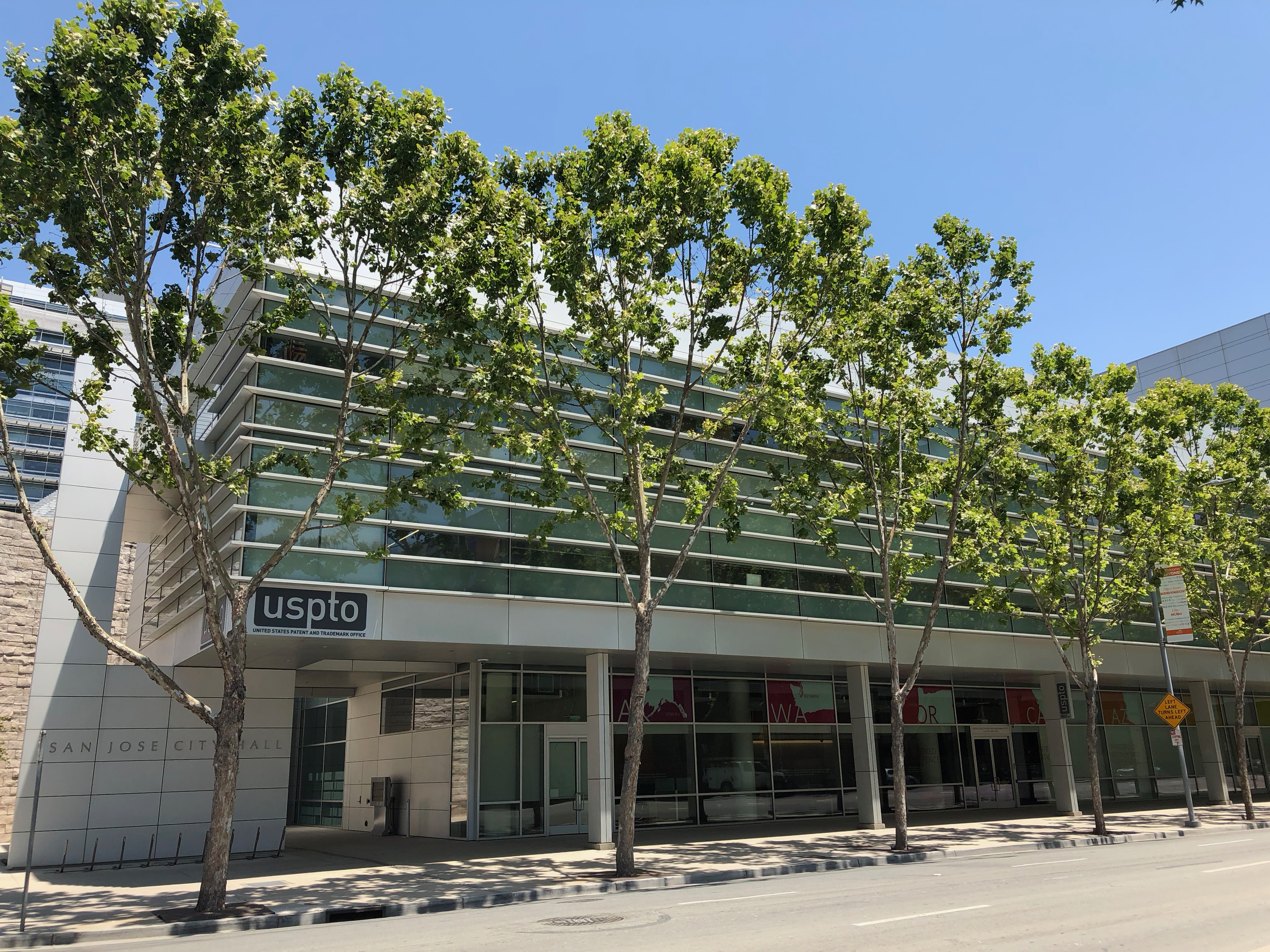
USPTO satellite office in San Jose, California

At end of FY	Employees	Patent examiners	Trademark examining attorneys	Patent filings (utility)	Trademark filings	Patent application backlog
2024	14,082	8,944	765	466,079	767,138	
2023	13,452	8,568	756	594,143	737,018	
2022	13,103	8,509	718	457,510	787,798	
2021	12,963	8,073	662	650,703	943,928	
2020	12,928	8,434	622	653,311	738,112	
2019	12,652	9,614	701	666,843	673,233	
2018	12,579	8,185	579	647,572	594,107	
2017	12,588	8,147	549	650,350	530,270	526,579
2016	12,725	8,351	570	650,411	530,270	537,655
2015	12,667	9,161	456	618,062	503,889	553,221
2014	12,450	9,302	429	618,457	455,017	
2013	11,773	8,051	409	601,464	433,654	
2012	11,531	7,935	386	565,406	415,026	608,283
2011	10,210	6,780	378	536,604	398,667	
2010	9,507	6,225	378	509,367	368,939	726,331
2009	9,716	6,243	388	485,500	352,051	750,596
2008	9,518	6,055	398	495,095	401,392	750,596
2007	8,913	5,477	404	467,243	394,368	
2006		4,779	413			
2005		4,177	357			
2004		3,681	286			
2003		3,579	256			
1998	5,300					
1996				189,979	200,640	
1995				221,304	175,307	
1994				186,126	155,376	
1993				174,553	139,735	
1992				172,539	125,237	
1986				120,988	69,253	
1976				101,807	37,074	

Patent examiners make up the bulk of the employees at USPTO. They hold degrees in various scientific disciplines, but do not necessarily hold law degrees. Unlike patent examiners, trademark examiners must be licensed attorneys.

All examiners work under a strict, "count"-based production system. For every application, "counts" are earned by composing, filing, and mailing a first office action on the merits, and upon disposal of an application.

Prior to 2012, decisions of patent examiners could be appealed to the Board of Patent Appeals and Interferences, an administrative law body of the USPTO. Decisions of the BPAI could further be appealed to the United States Court of Appeals for the Federal Circuit, or a civil suit could be brought against the Commissioner of Patents in the United States District Court for the Eastern District of Virginia. The United States Supreme Court may ultimately decide on a patent case. Under the America Invents Act, the BPAI was converted to the Patent Trial and Appeal Board or "PTAB". Similarly, decisions of trademark examiners could be appealed to the Trademark Trial and Appeal Board, with subsequent appeals directed to the Federal Circuit, or a civil action may also be brought.

=== Management ===
In March 2025, President Donald Trump nominated attorney John A. Squires, the former chief intellectual property attorney at Goldman Sachs, to serve as the USPTO director. He was sworn in on September 22, 2025. Coke Morgan Stewart, who served as Acting Director until Squires was sworn in, serves as the deputy director of the USPTO.

== Fee diversion ==
For many years, Congress has "diverted" about 10% of the fees that the USPTO collected into the general treasury of the United States. In effect, this took money collected from the patent system to use for the general budget. This fee diversion has been generally opposed by patent practitioners (e.g., patent attorneys and patent agents), inventors, the USPTO, as well as former federal judge Paul R. Michel. These stakeholders would rather use the funds to improve the patent office and patent system, such as by implementing the USPTO's 21st Century Strategic Plan. The last six annual budgets of the George W. Bush administration did not propose to divert any USPTO fees, and the first budget of the Barack Obama administration continued this practice, as well as the second budget of the Trump administration; however, stakeholders continue to press for a permanent end to fee diversion.

The discussion of which party can appropriate the fees is more than a financial question. Patent fees represent a policy lever that influences both the number of applications submitted to the office as well as their quality.

== Patents ==
First United States patent

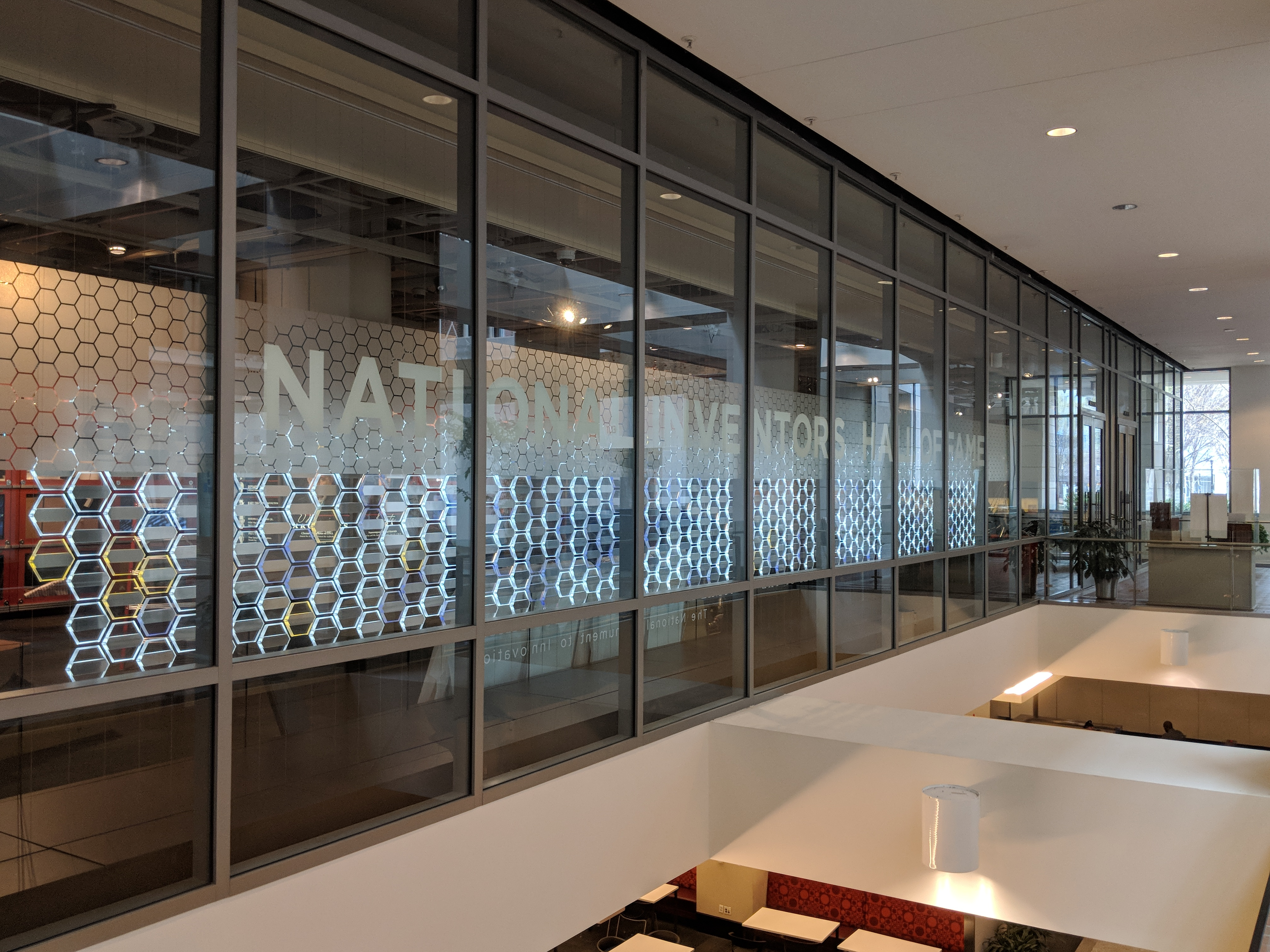
The National Inventors Hall of Fame is housed in the Madison Building of the USPTO.

- On July 31, 1790, the first U.S. patent was issued to Samuel Hopkins for an improvement "in the making of Pot ash and Pearl ash by a new Apparatus and Process". This patent was signed by President George Washington.
- The X-Patents (the first 9,957 (approximately), issued between 1790 and 1836) were destroyed by a fire; fewer than 3,000 of those have been recovered and re-issued with numbers that include an "X". The X generally appears at the end of the numbers hand-written on full-page patent images; however, in patent collections and for search purposes, the X is considered to be the patent type – analogous to the "D" of design patents – and appears at the beginning of the number. The X distinguishes the patents from those issued after the fire, which began again with patent number 1.
- Each year, the PTO issues over 150,000 patents to companies and individuals worldwide. As of December 2011, the PTO had granted 8,743,423 patents and received 16,020,302 applications.
- On June 19, 2018, the 10 millionth U.S. patent was issued to Joseph Marron for invention of a "Coherent LADAR [System] Using Intra-Pixel Quadrature Detection" to improve laser detection and ranging (LADAR). The patent was the first to receive the newly redesigned patent cover. It was signed by President Donald Trump during a special ceremony at the Oval Office.
- In February 2024, the USPTO issued a new guideline relating to obtaining a patent as per earlier recommendation by the Joe Biden administration. The guideline states that; to obtain a patent, a real person, not AI, must have made a "significant contribution" to the invention and that only a human being can be named as an inventor on a patent.

=== List of millionth U.S. patents ===
Patents issued under the revised numbering scheme of the Patent Act of 1836
Patent number	Patent title	Issue date	Days since preceding millionth issue
1	Traction Wheels	July 13, 1836	
1,000,000	Vehicle Tire	August 8, 1911	27,419
2,000,000	Vehicle Wheel Construction	May 12, 1932	7,583
3,000,000	Automatic Reading System	May 6, 1955	8,394
4,000,000	Process for Recycling Asphalt-Aggregate Compositions	December 28, 1976	7,907
5,000,000	Ethanol Production by Escherichia Coli Strains	March 19, 1991	5,194
6,000,000	Extendible Method and Apparatus for Synchronizing Multiple Files on Two Different Computer Systems	December 7, 1999	3,185
7,000,000	Polysaccharide Fibers	February 14, 2006	2,261
8,000,000	Visual Prosthesis	August 16, 2011	2,009
9,000,000	Windshield Washer Conditioner	April 7, 2015	1,330
10,000,000	Coherent Ladar Using Intra-Pixel Quadrature Detection	June 19, 2018	1,169
11,000,000	Repositioning Wires and Methods for Repositioning Prosthetic Heart Valve Devices within a Heart Chamber	May 11, 2021	1,057
12,000,000	Labeled Nucleotide Analogs, Reaction Mixtures, and Methods and System for Sequencing	June 4, 2024	1,120

=== Bar chart ===
Days since preceding millionth patent filed at the USPTO

== Trademarks ==
The USPTO examines applications for trademark registration, which can be filed under five different filing bases: use in commerce, intent to use, foreign application, foreign registration, or international registration. If approved, the trademarks are registered on either the Principal Register or the Supplemental Register, depending upon whether the mark meets the appropriate distinctiveness criteria. This federal system governs goods and services distributed via interstate commerce, and operates alongside state level trademark registration systems.

Trademark applications have grown substantially in recent years, jumping from 296,490 new applications in 2000, to 345,000 new applications in 2014, to 458,103 new applications in 2018. Recent growth has been driven partially by growing numbers of trademark applications originating in China; trademark applications from China have grown more than 12-fold since 2013, and in 2017, one in every nine trademark applications reviewed by the U.S. Trademark Office originated in China.

Since 2008, the Trademark Office has hosted a National Trademark Expo every two years, billing it as "a free, family-friendly event designed to educate the public about trademarks and their importance in the global marketplace." The Expo features celebrity speakers such as Anson Williams (of the television show Happy Days) and basketball player Kareem Abdul-Jabbar and has numerous trademark-holding companies as exhibitors. Before the 2009 National Trademark Expo, the Trademark Office designed and launched a kid-friendly trademark mascot known as T. Markey, who appears as an anthropomorphized registered trademark symbol. T. Markey is featured prominently on the Kids section of the USPTO website, alongside fellow IP mascots Ms. Pat Pending (with her robot cat GeaRS) and Mark Trademan.

In 2020, trademark applications marked the sharpest declines and inclines in American history. During the spring, COVID-19 lockdowns led to reduced filings, which then increased in July 2020 to exceed the previous year. August 2020 was subsequently the highest month of trademark filings in the history of the U.S. Patent and Trademark Office.

== Representation ==
The USPTO only allows certain qualified persons to practice before the USPTO. Practice includes filing of patent and trademark applications on behalf of individuals and companies, prosecuting the patent and trademark applications, and participating in administrative appeals and other proceedings before the PTO examiners, examining attorneys and boards. The USPTO sets its own standards for who may practice. Any person who practices patent law before the USPTO must become a registered patent attorney or agent. A patent agent is a person who has passed the USPTO registration examination (the "patent bar") but has not passed any state bar exam to become a licensed attorney; a patent attorney is a person who has passed both a state bar and the patent bar and is in good standing as an attorney. A patent agent can only act in a representative capacity in patent matters presented to the USPTO, and may not represent a patent holder or applicant in a court of law. To be eligible for taking the patent bar exam, a candidate must possess a degree in "engineering or physical science or the equivalent of such a degree". Any person who practices trademark law before the USPTO must be an active member in good standing of the highest court of any state.

The United States allows any citizen from any country to sit for the patent bar (if he/she has the requisite technical background). Only Canada has a reciprocity agreement with the United States that confers upon a patent agent similar rights.

An unrepresented inventor may file a patent application and prosecute it on his or her own behalf (pro se). If it appears to a patent examiner that an inventor filing a pro se application is not familiar with the proper procedures of the Patent Office, the examiner may suggest that the filing party obtain representation by a registered patent attorney or patent agent. The patent examiner cannot recommend a specific attorney or agent, but the Patent Office does post a list of those who are registered.

While the inventor of a relatively simple-to-describe invention may well be able to produce an adequate specification and detailed drawings, there remains language complexity in what is claimed, either in the particular claim language of a utility application, or in the manner in which drawings are presented in a design application. There is also skill required when searching for prior art that is used to support the application and to prevent applying for a patent for something that may be unpatentable. A patent examiner will make special efforts to help pro se inventors understand the process but the failure to adequately understand or respond to an office action from the USPTO can endanger the inventor's rights, and may lead to abandonment of the application.

== Electronic filing system ==
The USPTO accepts patent applications filed in electronic form. Inventors or their patent agents/attorneys can file applications as Adobe PDF documents. Filing fees can be paid by credit card or by a USPTO "deposit account".

== Patent search tools ==
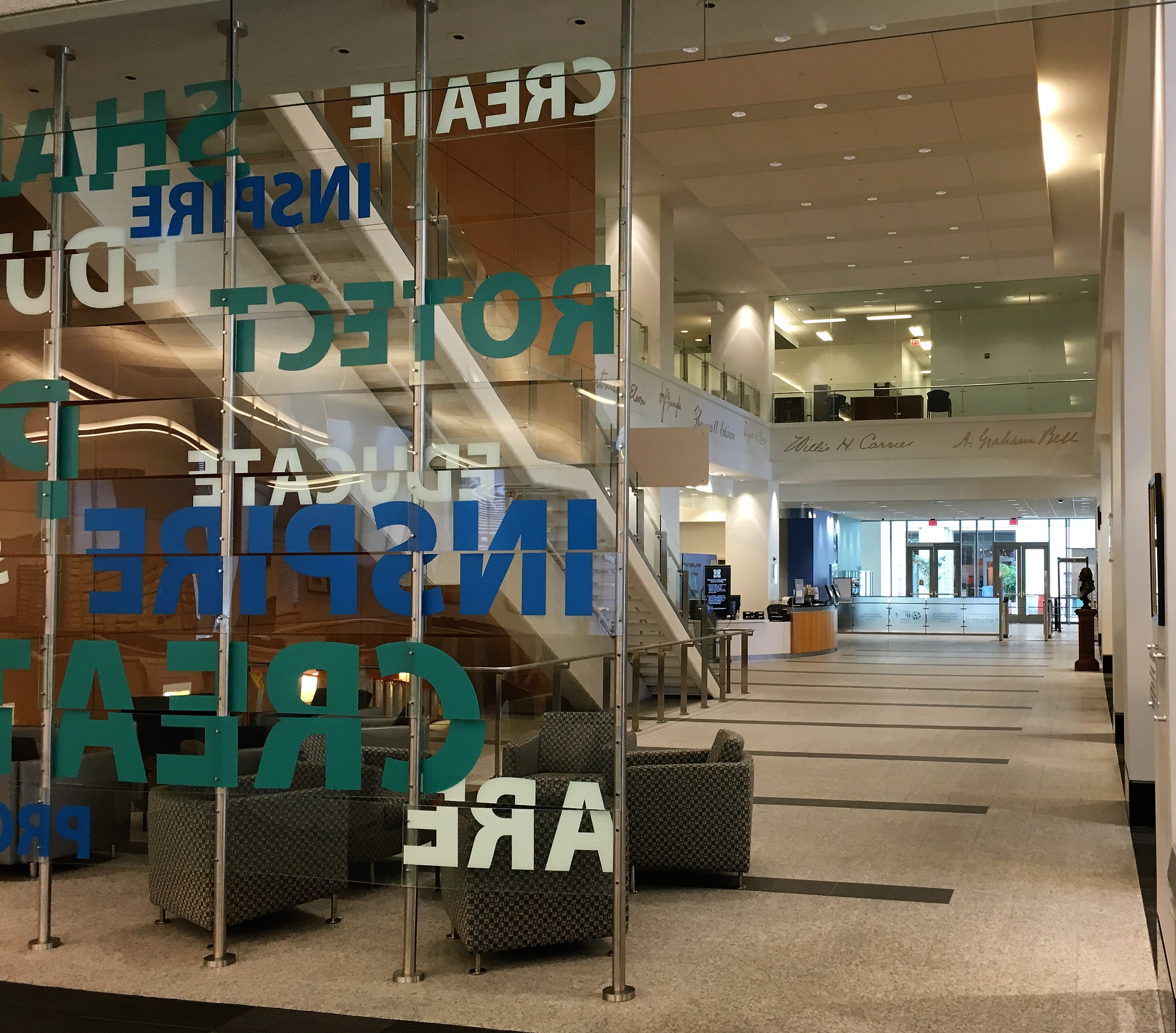
The lobby of the Public Search Facility, looking out toward the atrium, inside the Madison Building of the USPTO. The bronze bust of Thomas Jefferson is at the far right. Researchers can access patent search databases within the facility.

The USPTO web site provides free electronic copies of issued patents and patent applications as multiple-page TIFF (graphic) documents. The site also provides Boolean search and analysis tools.

The USPTO's free distribution service only distributes the patent documents as a set of TIFF files. Numerous free and commercial services provide patent documents in other formats, such as Adobe PDF and CPC.

== Criticisms ==
The USPTO has been criticized for granting patents for impossible or absurd, already known, or arguably obvious inventions. Economists have documented that, although the USPTO makes mistakes when granting patents, these mistakes might be less prominent than some might believe.

=== Controversial patents ===
- U.S. patent 5,443,036, "Method of exercising a cat", issued in 1995, covers having a cat chase the beam from a laser pointer. The patent has been criticized as being obvious.
- U.S. patent 6,004,596, "Sealed crustless sandwich", issued in 1999, covers the design of a sandwich with crimped edges. All claims of the patent were canceled by the PTO upon reexamination.
- U.S. patent 6,025,810, "Hyper-light-speed antenna", issued in 2000 for an antenna that sends signals faster than the speed of light. According to its description, "The present invention takes a transmission of energy, and instead of sending it through normal time and space, it pokes a small hole into another dimension, thus, sending the energy through a place which allows transmission of energy to exceed the speed of light."
- U.S. patent 6,368,227, "Method of swinging on a swing", issued April 9, 2002, was granted to a seven-year-old boy, whose father, a patent attorney, wanted to demonstrate how the patent system worked to his son who was five years old at the time of the application. The PTO initially rejected it due to prior art, but eventually issued the patent. Upon reexamination all claims of the patent were canceled by the PTO.
- U.S. patent 6,960,975, "Space vehicle propelled by the pressure of inflationary vacuum state", describes an anti-gravity device. In November 2005, the USPTO was criticized by physicists for granting it. The journal Nature first highlighted this patent issued for a device that presumably amounts to a perpetual motion machine, defying the laws of physics. The device comprises a particular electrically superconducting shield and electromagnetic generating device. The examiner allowed the claims because the design of the shield and device was novel and not obvious. In situations such as this where a substantial question of patentability is raised after a patent is issued, the Commissioner of the Patent Office can order a reexamination of the patent.

=== Controversial trademarks ===
- U.S. Trademark 77,139,082, "Cloud Computing" for Dell, covering "custom manufacture of computer hardware for use in data centers and mega-scale computing environments for others", was allowed by a trademark attorney on July 8, 2008. Cloud computing is a generic term that could define technology infrastructure for years to come, which had been in general use at the time of the application. The application was rejected on August 12, 2008, as descriptive and generic.
- U.S. Trademark 75,215,401, "Netbook" for Psion, covering "laptop computers" was registered on November 21, 2000. Although the company discontinued the netBook line in November 2003 and allowed the trademark to become genericized through use by journalists and vendors (products marketed as 'netbooks' include the Dell Inspiron Mini Series, Asus eeePC, HP Mini 1000, MSI Wind Netbook and others), USPTO subsequently rejected a number of trademarks citing a "likelihood of confusion" under section 2(d), including 'G NETBOOK' (U.S. Trademark 77,527,311 rejected October 31, 2008), MSI's 'WIND NETBOOK' (U.S. Trademark ) and Coby Electronics' 'COBY NETBOOK' (U.S. Trademark 77,590,174) rejected January 13, 2009. Psion also delivered a batch of cease-and-desist letters on December 23, 2008, relating to the genericized trademark.

=== Slow patent examination and backlog ===
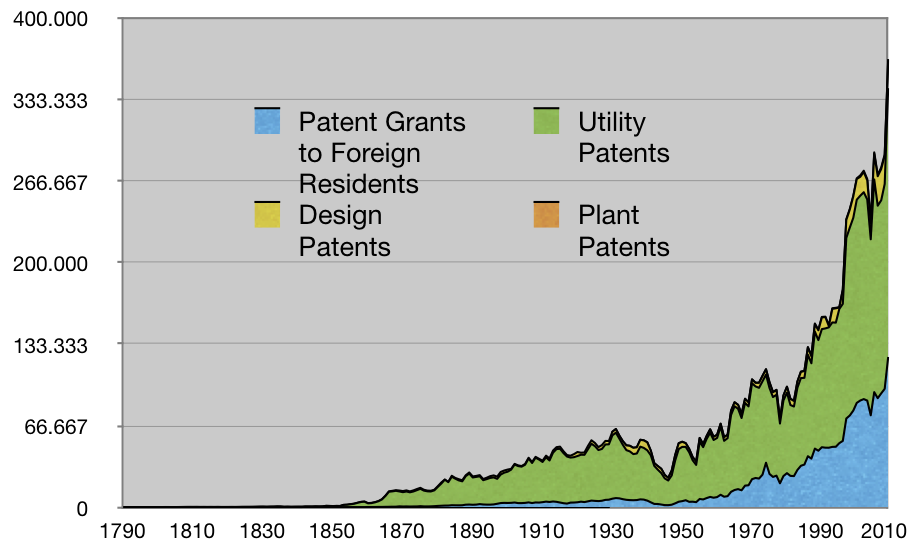
U.S. patents granted, 1790–2010

More U.S. utility patents have been issued in the most recent thirty years than in the first 200 years in which they were issued (1790–1990).

The USPTO has been criticized for taking an inordinate amount of time in examining patent applications. This is particularly true in the fast-growing area of business method patents. As of 2005, patent examiners in the business method area were still examining patent applications filed in 2001.

The delay was attributed by spokesmen for the Patent Office to a combination of a sudden increase in business method patent filings after the 1998 State Street Bank decision, the unfamiliarity of patent examiners with the business and financial arts (e.g., banking, insurance, stock trading etc.), and the issuance of a number of controversial patents (e.g., U.S. patent 5,960,411 "Amazon one click patent") in the business method area.

Effective August 2006, the USPTO introduced an accelerated patent examination procedure in an effort to allow inventors a speedy evaluation of an application with a final disposition within twelve months. The procedure requires additional information to be submitted with the application and also includes an interview with the examiner. The first accelerated patent was granted on March 15, 2007, with a six-month issuance time.

As of the end of 2008, there were 1,208,076 patent applications pending at the Patent Office. At the end of 1997, the number of applications pending was 275,295. Therefore, over those eleven years there was a 439% increase in the number of pending applications.

December 2012 data showed that there was 597,579 unexamined patent applications in the backlog. During the four years since 2009, more than a 50% reduction was achieved. First action pendency was reported as 19.2 months.

=== Fraud by remote working employees ===
In 2012, the USPTO initiated an internal investigation into allegations of fraud by employees taking advantage of its remote work policies. Investigators discovered that some patent examiners had lied about the hours they had worked, but high level officials prevented access to computer records, thus limiting the number of employees who could be punished.

== See also ==
Directors of the USPTO
1. List of people who have headed the United States Patent Office
...
r. Bruce Lehman (1993–1998)
s. Q. Todd Dickinson (1998–2001)
t. James E. Rogan (December 10, 2001 – January 9, 2004)
u. Jon Dudas (2004 – January 2009)
v. John J. Doll (January 2009 – August 13, 2009) (acting)
w. David J. Kappos (August 13, 2009 – February 1, 2013)
x. Teresa Stanek Rea (February 1, 2013 – November 21, 2013) (acting)
y. Margaret A. (Peggy) Focarino (November 21, 2013 – January 12, 2014) (by delegation)
z. Michelle K. Lee (January 13, 2014 – June 6, 2017)
aa. Joseph Matal (June 7, 2017 – February 8, 2018) (acting)
bb. Andrei Iancu (February 8, 2018 – January 20, 2021)
cc. Kathi Vidal (April 19, 2022 – December 16, 2024)
dd. John A. Squires (September 22, 2025 – Present)

- Confederate Patent Office
- Criticism of the United States government § Criticism of agencies
- Electronic Filing System (USPTO)
- Ex Parte Quayle
- Google Patents
- John Ruggles
- Invention Secrecy Act
- NASA spinoff
- National Inventors Hall of Fame
- Office of Independent Inventor Programs (1999)
- Old Patent Office Building
- Patent Application Information Retrieval (PAIR)
- Patent model
- Patent Office Professional Association (POPA)
- Science and technology in the United States
- Technological history of the United States
- Timeline of United States discoveries
- Timeline of United States inventions
- Yankee ingenuity
- 1836 U.S. Patent Office fire
- 1877 U.S. Patent Office fire
