= Under Secretary of Commerce for Intellectual Property =

United States Under Secretary of Commerce for Intellectual Property
- Seal of the U.S. Patent and Trademark Office

- Flag of an under secretary of commerce

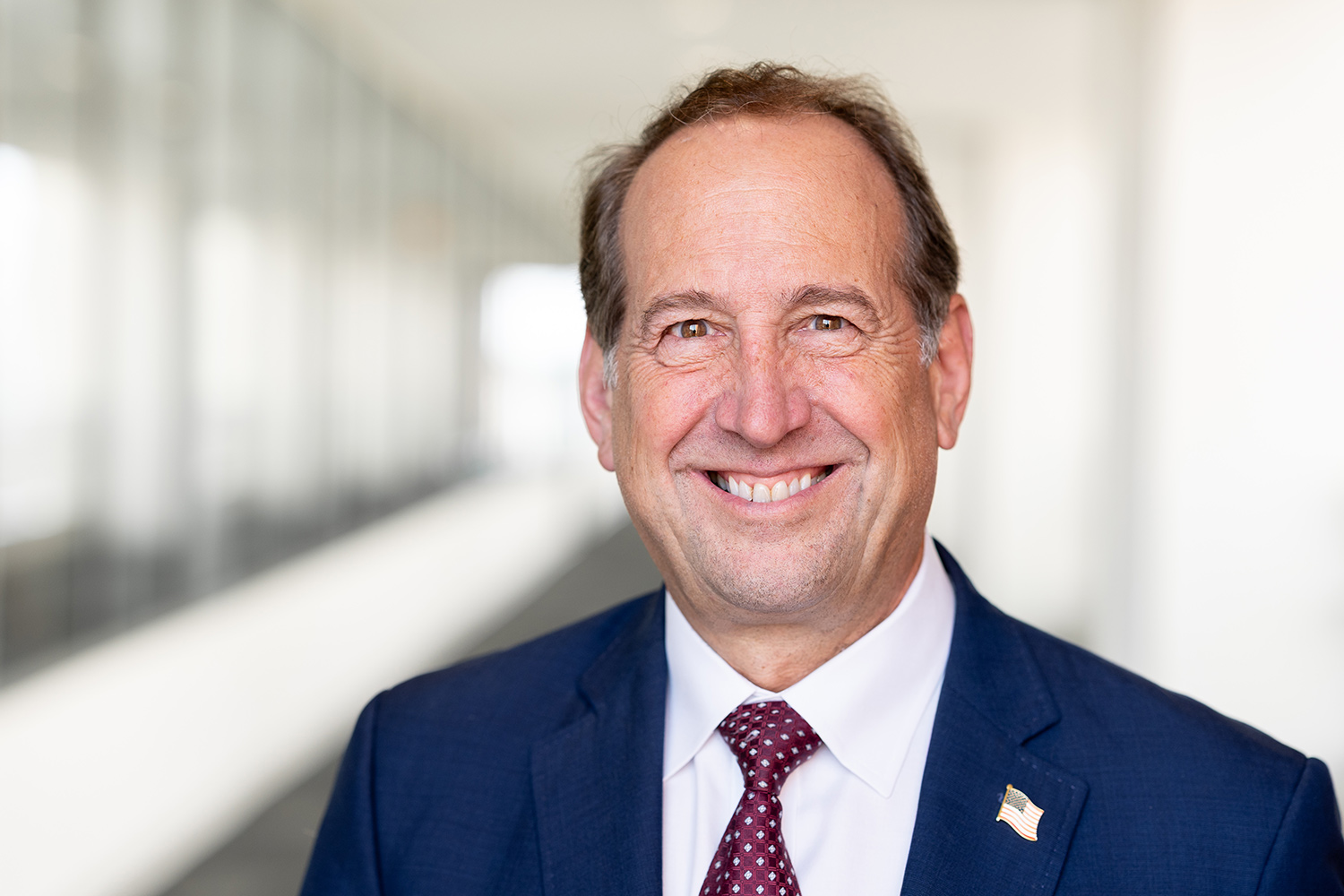
- Incumbent; John A. Squires since September 22, 2025
- Appointer: The president; with Senate advice and consent
- Formation: January 17, 2001
- First holder: Q. Todd Dickinson
- Website: www.uspto.gov

The under secretary of commerce for intellectual property, or USC(IP), is a senior official in the United States Department of Commerce and the principal advisor to the United States Secretary of Commerce on the intellectual property matters. In tandem, the under secretary is also the Director of the United States Patent and Trademark Office within the Commerce Department, filling dual roles.

The under secretary is appointed by the president of the United States, with the consent of the United States Senate, to serve at the pleasure of the President.

== Overview ==
As the director of the United States Patent and Trademark Office, the under secretary is responsible for administering laws relevant to granting patents and trademarks, and for the daily management of the agency's budget and more than 8,000 employees. The under secretary is also obligated to conduct programs and studies regarding intellectual property, and to conduct cooperative programs with other foreign intellectual property offices.

The rank of under secretary is a Level III position within the Executive Schedule. In January 2010, the annual rate of pay for Level III is $165,300.

As of September 2025, John A. Squires is undersecretary and director, having been sworn on September 22.

== See also ==
- List of people who have headed the United States Patent Office
