= Ministry of Justice (Portugal) =

Government ministry of Portugal

- Ministério da Justiça
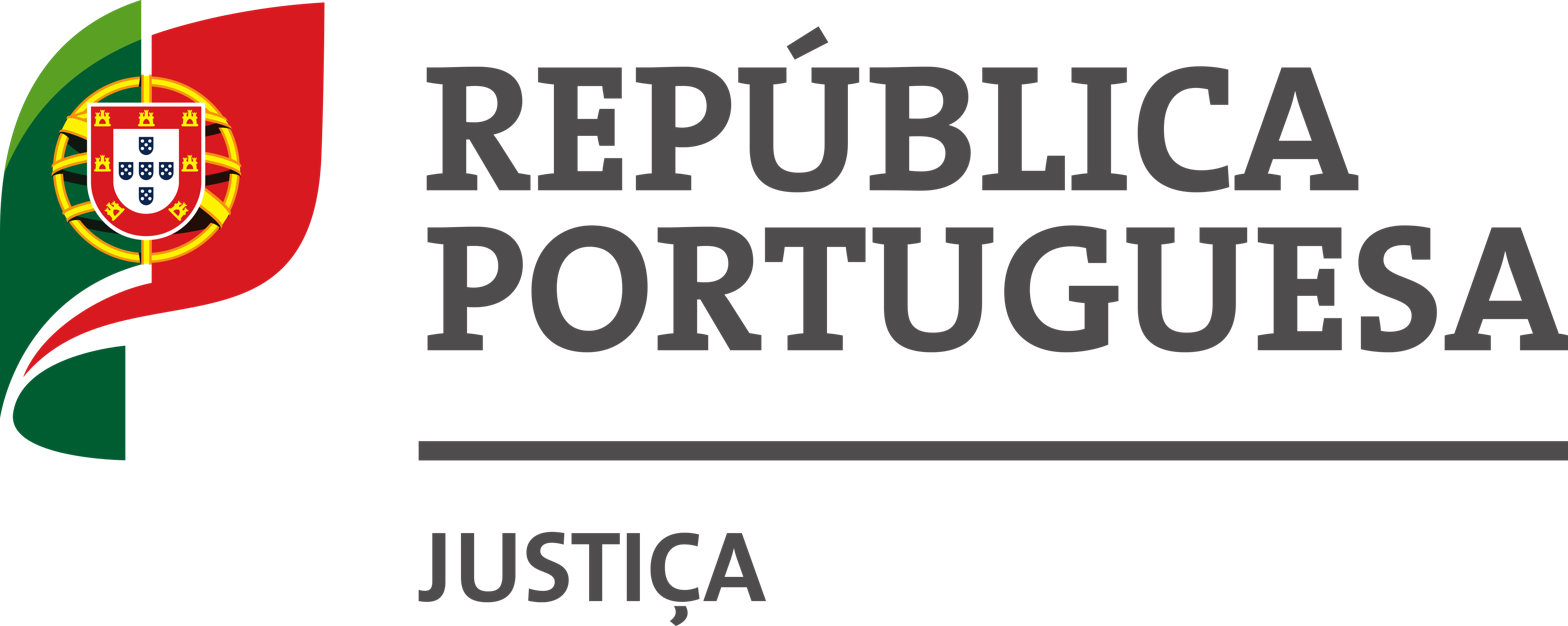
- Logo of the ministry

- Flag of the minister

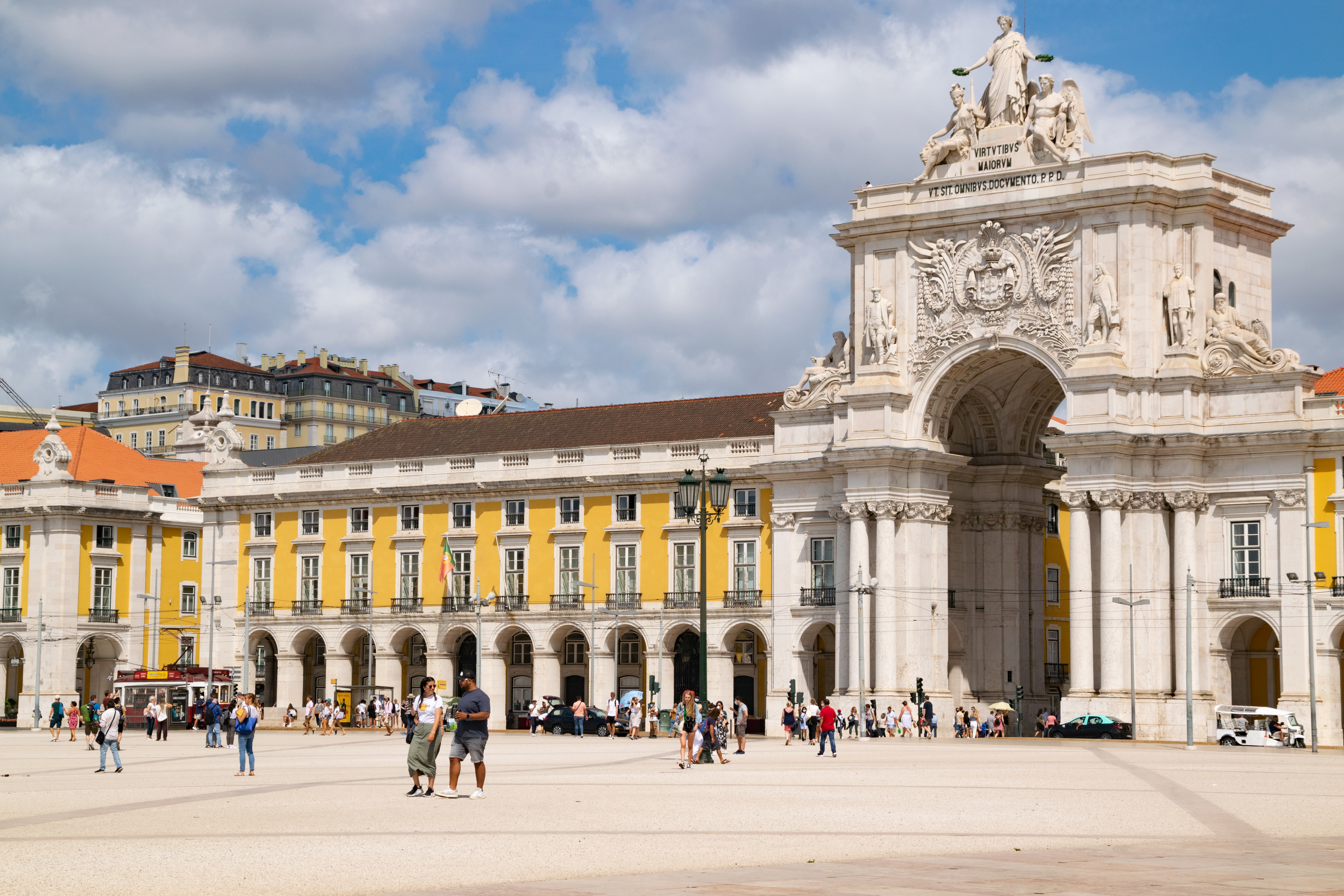
- Headquarters of the ministry in Lisbon

Ministry overview
- Formed: August 23, 1821; 205 years ago
- Preceding Ministry: Secretariat of State for the Interior Affairs of the Kingdom
- Type: Ministry of justice
- Jurisdiction: Government of Portugal
- Headquarters: Praça do Comércio North Wing, Lisbon, Portugal; 38°42′30.0744″N 9°8′14.0064″W
- Minister responsible: Rita Júdice, Minister of Justice
- Child agencies: Polícia Judiciária; Institute of Registries and Notary; National Industrial Property Institute; Judicial Studies Center
- Website: www.portugal.gov.pt/pt/ministerios/mj.aspx

The Ministry of Justice (Portuguese: Ministério da Justiça) is the Portuguese government ministry responsible for the administration of the judiciary system. It is headed by the Minister of Justice.

The Ministry of Justice should not be confused with the Public Ministry, which is not a government ministry but the independent body of magistrates of the judiciary charged with the public prosecution and legal representation of the State before the courts.

Unlike many other countries, the Portuguese Minister of Justice does not have any kind of hierarchic authority over the public prosecutors.

== Roles ==
The roles of the Ministry of Justice include:

- to conceive, to conduct, to execute and to assess the policy of Justice defined by the Assembly of the Republic and by the Government;
- to assure the relationship of the Government with the courts, the Public Ministry, the Higher Council of Magistrates and the Higher Council of the Administrative and Tax Courts.

== History ==
The present Ministry of Justice was created in 1821 as the Secretariat of State of the Ecclesiastical and Justice Affairs (also referred as the Ministry of Ecclesiastical and Justice Affairs). In 1910, it became the Ministry of Justice and Cults and in 1940, it became the Ministry of Justice.

== Organization ==
The Ministry of Justice is headed by the minister, assisted by the Secretaries of State of Justice.

The following agencies are part of the Ministry of Justice:

- Directorate-General of the Policy of Justice
- Inspectorate-General of the Services of Justice
- Secretariat-General of the Ministry of Justice
- Judiciary Police
- Directorate-General of the Administration of Justice
- Directorate-General of the Probation and Prison Services
- Institute of Justice Equipment and Facilities Management
- Institute of Registries and Notary
- National Industrial Property Institute
- National Institute of Legal Medicine and Forensic Sciences
- Center of Judiciary Studies
- Crime Victims Protection Commission
- Insolvency Administrators Activity Control and Appreciation Commission

== List of ministers ==
=== Regency of D. Pedro (1830-1834) ===
#	Minister and Secretary of State for Ecclesiastical Affairs and Justice (Birth-Death)	Beginning of the mandate	End of mandate	Government
1	Luís da Silva Mouzinho de Albuquerque (1792-1846)	March 15, 1830	January 14, 1831	Gov. Reg.
-	António César de Vasconcelos Correia (interim) (1797-1865)	January 14, 1831	July 2, 1831	Gov. Reg.
2	José António Ferreira Brak-Lamy (1780-1847)	July 2, 1831	October 10, 1831	Gov. Reg.
3	José Dionísio da Serra (1772-1836)	October 10, 1831	March 3, 1832	Gov. Reg.
4	José Xavier Mouzinho da Silveira (acting) (1780-1849)	March 3, 1832	December 3, 1832	Gov. Reg.
5	Joaquim António de Magalhães (1795-1848)	December 3, 1832	April 21, 1833	Gov. Reg.
6	José da Silva Carvalho (interim) (1782-1856)	April 21, 1833	April 23, 1834	Gov. Reg.
7	Joaquim António de Aguiar (1792-1884)	April 23, 1834	September 24, 1834	Gov. Reg.

=== Constitutional Monarchy (1830-1910) ===
#	Minister and Secretary of State for Ecclesiastical Affairs and Justice (Birth-Death)	Beginning of the mandate	End of mandate	Government
8	António Barreto Ferraz de Vasconcelos (1789-1861)	September 24, 1834	April 28, 1835	I
9	Manuel Duarte Leitão (1787-1856)	April 28, 1835	May 27, 1835	I
10	Manuel António de Carvalho (1785-1858)	May 27, 1835	July 15, 1835	II
11	João de Sousa Pinto de Magalhães (1790-1865)	July 15, 1835	November 18, 1835	III
12	Manuel António Velez Caldeira de Pina Castelo Branco (1791-1868)	November 18, 1835	April 20, 1836	IV
13	Joaquim António de Aguiar (2nd time) (1792-1884)	April 20, 1836	September 10, 1836	V
14	António Manuel Lopes Vieira de Castro (1766-1842)	September 10, 1836	November 4, 1836	SAW
-	Francisco de Paula de Oliveira (not sworn in) (1768-1865)	November 4, 1836	November 5, 1836	GM
-	António Manuel Lopes Vieira de Castro (re-elected) (1766-1842)	November 5, 1836	May 27, 1837	VII
15	Manuel da Silva Passos "Manuel " (interim) (1801-1862)	May 27, 1837	June 1, 1837	VII
16	António Dias de Oliveira (acting) (1804-1863)	June 1, 1837	August 10, 1837	VIII
17	José Alexandre de Campos e Almeida (1794-1850)	August 10, 1837	March 9, 1838	IX
18	João Gualberto de Oliveira (acting) (1788-1852)	March 9, 1838	March 22, 1838	IX
19	Manuel Duarte Leitão (2nd time, acting) (1787-1856)	March 22, 1838	August 22, 1838	IX
20	António Fernandes Coelho (interim) (1807-1886)	August 22, 1838	April 18, 1839	IX
21	João Cardoso da Cunha Araújo and Castro Portocarrero (1792-1864)	April 18, 1839	November 26, 1839	X
22	António Bernardo da Costa Cabral (1803-1889)	November 26, 1839	January 12, 1842	XI
22	António Bernardo da Costa Cabral (1803-1889)	November 26, 1839	January 12, 1842	XII
23	Joaquim António de Aguiar (3rd time, interim) (1792-1884)	January 12, 1842	February 7, 1842	XII
24	Joaquim António de Magalhães (2nd time, acting) (1795-1848)	February 7, 1842	February 8, 1842	XIII (GE)
25	Joaquim Filipe de Soure (1805-1882)	February 8, 1842		XIII (GE)
-	Provisional Government Board composed of: António Bernardo da Costa Cabral António Vicente de Queirós, Barão da Ponte de Santa Maria Marcelino Máximo de Azevedo and Melo António Pereira dos Reis	February 8, 1842	February 9, 1842	-
26	Luís da Silva Mouzinho de Albuquerque (2nd time, acting) (1792-1846)	February 9, 1842	February 20, 1842	XIV
27	João Baptista Felgueiras (1787-1848)	February 20, 1842	February 24, 1842	XIV
28	António de Azevedo Melo e Carvalho (1795-1862)	February 24, 1842	September 14, 1842	XIV
29	José António de Sousa Azevedo, Viscount of Algés (1796-1865)	September 14, 1842	June 27, 1844	XIV
-	D. António José de Sousa Manuel de Meneses Severim de Noronha, Duque da Terceira and Count of Vila Flor (interim) (1792-1860)	June 27, 1844	July 15, 1844	XIV
30	António Bernardo da Costa Cabral, Count of Tomar (interim) (1803-1889)	July 15, 1844	May 3, 1845	XIV
31	José Bernardo da Silva Cabral (interim until July 24, 1845) (1801-1869)	May 3, 1845	April 21, 1846	XIV
-	António Bernardo da Costa Cabral, Count of Tomar (interim) (1803-1889)	April 21, 1846	May 20, 1846	XIV
32	D. Pedro de Sousa Holstein, Duke of Palmela (interim) (1781-1850)	May 20, 1846	May 26, 1846	XV
33	Joaquim Filipe de Soure (2nd time) (1805-1882)	May 26, 1846	July 19, 1846	XV
34	Joaquim António de Aguiar (4th time) (1792-1884)	July 19, 1846	October 6, 1846	XV
35	José Jacinto Valente Farinho (1792-1855)	October 6, 1846	April 28, 1847	XVI
36	Manuel Duarte Leitão (3rd time) (1787-1856)	April 28, 1847	August 22, 1847	XVI
37	Francisco António Fernandes da Silva Ferrão (1798-1874)	August 22, 1847	December 18, 1847	XVI
-	Bernardo Gorjão Henriques da Cunha Coimbra Botado e Serra (interim) (1786-1854)	December 18, 1847	January 21, 1848	XVII
38	Joaquim José de Queirós (1774-1850)	January 21, 1848	February 21, 1848	XVII
39	José Joaquim de Azevedo e Moura (1794-1876)	February 21, 1848	March 29, 1848	XVII
40	João Elias da Costa Faria e Silva (1788-1860)	March 29, 1848	January 29, 1849	XVII
41	José Marcelino de Sá Vargas (1802-1876)	January 29, 1849	June 18, 1849	XVII
42	Félix Pereira de Magalhães (1794-1878)	June 18, 1849	May 1, 1851	XVIII
42	Félix Pereira de Magalhães (1794-1878)	June 18, 1849	May 1, 1851	XIX
43	Marino Miguel Franzini (interim) (1779-1861)	May 1, 1851	May 22, 1851	XX
44	Joaquim Filipe de Soure (3rd time) (1805-1882)	May 22, 1851	July 7, 1851	XXI
-	Mr. António Bernardo da Fonseca Moniz (not sworn in) (1789-1859)	July 7, 1851	March 4, 1852	XXI
45	Rodrigo da Fonseca Magalhães (acting) (1787-1858)	July 7, 1851	March 4, 1852	XXI
46	António Luís de Seabra e Sousa, Viscount of Seabra (1798-1895)	March 4, 1852	August 19, 1852	XXI
47	Rodrigo da Fonseca Magalhães (2nd time, acting) (1787-1858)	August 19, 1852	September 3, 1853	XXI
48	Frederico Guilherme da Silva Pereira (1806-1871)	September 3, 1853	June 6, 1856	XXI
49	Elias da Cunha Pessoa (1801-1860)	June 6, 1856	March 14, 1857	XXII
50	Vicente Ferrer Neto Paiva (1798-1886)	March 14, 1857	May 4, 1857	XXII
51	António José de Ávila (acting) (1807-1881)	May 4, 1857	December 7, 1857	XXII
52	José Silvestre Ribeiro (1807-1891)	December 7, 1857	March 31, 1858	XXII
53	António José de Ávila (2nd time, acting) (1807-1881)	March 31, 1858	March 16, 1859	XXII
54	João Baptista da Silva Ferrão de Carvalho Martens " Ferrão " (1824-1895)	March 16, 1859	July 4, 1860	XXIII
54	João Baptista da Silva Ferrão de Carvalho Martens " Ferrão " (1824-1895)	March 16, 1859	July 4, 1860	XXIV
55	Alberto António de Morais Carvalho, father (1801-1878)	July 4, 1860	February 21, 1862	XXV
56	Gaspar Pereira da Silva (1801-1870)	February 21, 1862	November 2, 1863	XXV
-	Anselmo José Braamcamp de Almeida Castelo Branco (acting) (1817-1885)	November 2, 1863	November 16, 1863	XXV
-	Gaspar Pereira da Silva (continuation) (1801-1870)	November 16, 1963	March 5, 1865	XXV
57	D. António Frutuoso Aires de Gouveia Osório (1828-1916)	March 5, 1865	April 17, 1865	XXV
58	Júlio Gomes da Silva Sanches (interim) (1803-1866)	April 17, 1865	September 4, 1865	XXVI
59	Augusto César Barjona de Freitas (1834-1900)	September 4, 1865	January 4, 1868	XXVII
60	António Luís de Seabra e Sousa, Viscount of Seabra (2nd time) (1798-1895)	January 4, 1868	July 22, 1868	XXVIII
-	D. António Alves Martins (interim ) (1808-1882)	July 22, 1868	August 15, 1868	XXIX
61	António Adriano Pequito Seixas de Andrade (1819-1895)	August 15, 1868	June 18, 1869	XXIX
-	Mr. António Alves Martins (acting) (1808-1882)	June 18, 1869	July 24, 1869	XXIX
-	António Adriano Pequito Seixas de Andrade (continuation) (1819-1895)	July 24, 1869	August 2, 1869	XXIX
62	João José de Mendonça Cortes (1837-1912)	August 2, 1869	August 11, 1869	XXIX
63	José Luciano de Castro Pereira Corte-Real (1834-1914)	August 11, 1869	May 20, 1870	XXX
64	D. João Carlos Gregório Domingos Vicente Francisco de Saldanha Oliveira and Daun, Duke of Saldanha (interim) (1790-1876)	May 20, 1870	May 26, 1870	XXXI
65	José Dias Ferreira (interim) (1837-1909)	May 26, 1870	August 29, 1870	XXXI
66	António José de Ávila, Marques de Ávila and Bolama (3rd time, interim) (1806-1881)	August 29, 1870	September 12, 1870	XXXII
67	Mr. António Alves Martins (acting) (1808-1882)	September 12, 1870	October 29, 1870	XXXII
68	Augusto Saraiva de Carvalho (1839-1882)	October 29, 1870	January 30, 1871	XXXIII
69	José Eduardo de Melo Gouveia (interim) (1815-1893)	January 30, 1871	March 1, 1871	XXXIII
70	José Marcelino de Sá Vargas (2nd time) (1802-1876)	March 1, 1871	September 13, 1871	XXXIII
71	Augusto César Barjona de Freitas (2nd time) (1834-1900)	September 13, 1871	November 9, 1876	XXXIV
72	António Cardoso Avelino (1822-1889)	November 9, 1876	March 5, 1877	XXXIV
73	José de Sande Magalhães Mexia Salema (1816-1893)	March 5, 1877	January 29, 1878	XXXV
74	Augusto César Barjona de Freitas (3rd time) (1834-1900)	January 29, 1878	November 15, 1878	XXXVI
75	Tomás António Ribeiro Ferreira (interim) (1831-1901)	November 15, 1878	December 3, 1878	XXXVI
76	António Maria do Couto Monteiro (1821-1896)	December 3, 1878	June 1, 1879	XXXVI
77	Adriano de Abreu Cardoso Machado (1829-1891)	June 1, 1879	March 25, 1881	XXXVII
78	António José de Barros e Sá (1822-1903)	March 25, 1881	November 14, 1881	XXXVIII
79	Júlio Marques de Vilhena (1845-1928)	November 14, 1881	October 24, 1883	XXXIX
80	Lopo Vaz de Sampaio e Melo (1848-1892)	October 24, 1883	February 4, 1885	XL
81	Augusto César Barjona de Freitas (4th time, interim) (1834-1900)	February 4, 1885	November 19, 1885	XL
82	Manuel de Asuncion (n / a-n / d)	November 19, 1885	February 20, 1886	XL
83	Francisco António da Veiga Beirão (1841-1916)	February 20, 1886	October 6, 1886	XLI
-	José Luciano de Castro Pereira Corte-Real (interim) (1834-1914)	October 6, 1886	October 19, 1886	XLI
-	Francisco António da Veiga Beirão (continuation) (1841-1916)	October 19, 1886	January 14, 1890	XLI
84	Lopo Vaz de Sampaio e Melo (2nd time) (1848-1892)	January 14, 1890	October 13, 1890	XLII
85	António Emílio Correia de Sá Brandão (1821-1909)	October 13, 1890	May 21, 1891	XLIII
86	Alberto António de Morais Carvalho, son (1853-1932)	May 21, 1891	January 17, 1892	XLIV
87	D. António Frutuoso Aires de Gouveia Osório (2nd time, acting) (1828-1916)	January 17, 1892	May 27, 1892	XLV
88	António Teles Pereira de Vasconcelos Pimentel (c.1845-n / d)	May 27, 1892	February 22, 1893	XLVI
89	António de Azevedo Castelo Branco (1842-1916)	February 22, 1893	February 7, 1897	XLVII
90	Francisco António da Veiga Beirão (2nd time) (1841-1916)	February 7, 1897	August 18, 1898	XLVIII
91	José Maria de Alpoim Cerqueira Borges Cabral (1858-1916)	August 18, 1898	June 25, 1900	XLIX
92	Artur Alberto de Campos Henriques (1853-1922)	June 25, 1900	July 4, 1903	L
92	Artur Alberto de Campos Henriques (1853-1922)	June 25, 1900	July 4, 1903	Li
-	Luís Augusto Pimentel Pinto (interim) (1843-1913)	July 4, 1903	September 7, 1903	Li
-	Artur Alberto de Campos Henriques (continuation) (1853-1922)	September 7, 1903	October 20, 1904	Li
93	José Maria de Alpoim Cerqueira Borges Cabral (2nd time) (1858-1916)	October 20, 1904	May 10, 1905	LII
94	Artur Pinto de Miranda Montenegro (1871-1941)	May 10, 1905	March 20, 1906	LII
94	Artur Pinto de Miranda Montenegro (1871-1941)	May 10, 1905	March 20, 1906	LIII
95	Artur Alberto de Campos Henriques (2nd time) (1853-1922)	March 20, 1906	May 19, 1906	LIV
96	José Joaquim de Abreu do Couto by Amorim Novais (1855-1913)	May 19, 1906	May 2, 1907	LV
97	António José Teixeira de Abreu (1865-1930)	May 2, 1907	February 4, 1908	LV
98	Artur Alberto de Campos Henriques (3rd time) (1853-1922)	February 4, 1908	December 25, 1908	LVI
99	João de Alarcão Velasques Sarmento Osório (1854-1918)	December 25, 1908	April 11, 1909	LVII
100	Amadeu Teles da Silva de Afonseca Mesquita de Castro Pereira and Solla, Count of Castro and Solla (1874-1948)	April 11, 1909	May 14, 1909	LVIII
101	Francisco José de Medeiros (1845-1912)	May 14, 1909	October 26, 1909	LIX
102	Venceslau de Sousa Pereira de Lima (acting) (1858-1919)	October 26, 1909	December 22, 1909	LIX
103	Artur Pinto de Miranda Montenegro (2nd time) (1871-1941)	December 22, 1909	May 10, 1910	LX
104	Francisco António da Veiga Beirão (3rd time) (1841-1916)	May 10, 1910	June 26, 1910	LX
105	Manuel Joaquim Fratel (1869-1938)	June 26, 1910	October 5, 1910	LXI

=== First Republic (1911-1926) ===
==== Provisional Government (1910-1911) ====
#	Minister of Justice (Birth-Death)	Beginning of the mandate	End of mandate	Government
106	Afonso Augusto da Costa (1871-1937)	October 5, 1910	March 14, 1911	Gov. Prov. (I)
-	Bernardino Luís Machado Guimarães (interim) (1851-1944)	March 14, 1911	April 4, 1911	Gov. Prov. (I)
-	Afonso Augusto da Costa (continuation) (1871-1937)	April 4, 1911	May 18, 1911	Gov. Prov. (I)
-	Bernardino Luís Machado Guimarães (interim) (1851-1944)	May 18, 1911	July 26, 1911	Gov. Prov. (I)
-	Afonso Augusto da Costa (continuation) (1871-1937)	July 26, 1911	September 3, 1911	Gov. Prov. (I)

==== Constitutional Governments (1911-1917) ====
#	Minister of Justice and Cults (Birth-Death)	Beginning of the mandate	End of mandate	Government
107	Diogo Tavares de Melo Leote (1849-1920)	September 4, 1911	November 12, 1911	II
108	António Caetano Macieira Júnior (1875-1918)	November 12, 1911	June 16, 1912	III
109	Francisco Correia de Lemos (1852-1914)	June 16, 1912	January 9, 1913	IV
110	Álvaro Xavier de Castro (1878-1928)	January 9, 1913	February 9, 1914	V
111	Manuel Joaquim Rodrigues Monteiro (1879-1952)	February 9, 1914	June 23, 1914	SAW
112	Bernardino Luís Machado Guimarães (interim) (1851-1944)	June 23, 1914	July 22, 1914	VII
113	Eduardo Augusto de Sousa Monteiro (1864-1965)	July 22, 1914	December 1, 1914	VII
-	Eduardo Augusto de Sousa Monteiro (continuation) (1864-1965)	December 1, 1914	December 12, 1914	VII
114	Augusto Luís Vieira Soares (interim) (1873-1954)	December 12, 1914	December 21, 1914	VIII
115	José Maria Vilhena Barbosa de Magalhães (1879-1959)	December 21, 1914	January 25, 1915	VIII
116	José Joaquim Pereira Pimenta de Castro (interim) (1846-1918)	January 25, 1915	January 28, 1915	IX
117	Guilherme Alves Moreira (1861-1922)	January 28, 1915	May 14, 1915	IX
-	Constitutional Board composed of: José Maria Mendes Ribeiro Norton de Matos; António Maria da Silva; José de Freitas Ribeiro; Alfredo Ernesto de Sá Cardoso; Álvaro Xavier de Castro	May 14, 1915	May 15, 1915	-
118	Paulo José Falcão (1873-1950)	May 15, 1915	June 19, 1915	X
119	João Catanho de Meneses (1854-1942)	June 19, 1915	March 15, 1916	XI
119	João Catanho de Meneses (1854-1942)	June 19, 1915	March 15, 1916	XII
120	Luis Augusto de Sales Pinto Mosque of Carvalho (1868-1931)	March 15, 1916	April 25, 1917	XIII
121	Alexandre Braga, son (1871-1921)	April 25, 1917	November 28, 1917	XIV
-	José Maria Vilhena Barbosa de Magalhães (acting) (1879-1959)	November 28, 1917	December 8, 1917	XIV

==== New Republic (1917-1918) ====
#	Secretary of State for Justice and Cults (Birth-Death)	Beginning of the mandate	End of mandate	Government
-	Revolutionary Junta composed of: Sidónio Bernardino Cardoso da Silva Pais (President); António Maria de Azevedo Machado Santos (Member); José Feliciano da Costa Júnior (Member)	December 8, 1917	December 11, 1917	-
122	Alberto de Moura Pinto (1883-1960)	December 11, 1917	March 7, 1918	XV
123	Martinho Nobre de Melo (1891-1985)	March 7, 1918	May 15, 1918	XV
124	Alberto Osório de Castro (1868-1946)	May 15, 1918	October 8, 1918	XVI
#	Minister of Justice and Cults (Birth-Death)	Beginning of the mandate	End of mandate	XVI
125	Jorge Couceiro da Costa (1858-1937)	October 8, 1918	December 16, 1918	XVI
-	Jorge Couceiro da Costa (continuation) (1858-1937)	December 16, 1918	December 23, 1918	XVI

==== Constitutional Governments (1918-1926) ====
#	Minister of Justice and Cults (Birth-Death)	Beginning of the mandate	End of mandate	Government
126	Alfonso de Melo Pinto Veloso (1878-1968)	December 23, 1918	January 7, 1919	XVII
127	Francisco Joaquim Fernandes (1869-1923)	January 7, 1919	January 27, 1919	XVIII
128	Francisco Manuel Couceiro da Costa (1870-1925)	January 27, 1919	February 15, 1919	XIX
-	Domingos Pereira (1880-1956)	February 15, 1919	February 22, 1919	XIX
-	Francisco Manuel Couceiro da Costa (continuation) (1870-1925)	February 22, 1919	March 30, 1919	XXI
129	António Joaquim Granjo (1881-1921)	March 30, 1919	June 29, 1919	XX
130	Artur Alberto da Cunha Camacho Lopes Cardoso (1881-1968)	June 29, 1919	January 15, 1920	XXI
-	Luis Augusto de Sales Pinto Carvalho Mosque (not taken over) (1868-1931)	January 15, 1920		XXII
-	Artur Alberto da Cunha Camacho Lopes Cardoso (re-elected) (1881-1968)	January 15, 1920	January 21, 1920	XXI
131	Luis Augusto de Sales Pinto Mosque of Carvalho (2nd time) (1868-1931)	January 21, 1920	March 8, 1920	XXIII
132	José Ramos Preto (1871-1949)	March 8, 1920	June 26, 1920	XXIV
133	António Joaquim de Oliveira e Castro (1865-n/a)	June 26, 1920	July 19, 1920	XXV
134	Artur Alberto da Cunha Camacho Lopes Cardoso (2nd time) (1881-1968)	July 19, 1920	May 23, 1921	XXVI
134	Artur Alberto da Cunha Camacho Lopes Cardoso (2nd time) (1881-1968)	July 19, 1920	May 23, 1921	XXVII
134	Artur Alberto da Cunha Camacho Lopes Cardoso (2nd time) (1881-1968)	July 19, 1920	May 23, 1921	XXVIII
134	Artur Alberto da Cunha Camacho Lopes Cardoso (2nd time) (1881-1968)	July 19, 1920	May 23, 1921	XXIX
135	José do Vale de Matos Cid (1871-1945)	May 23, 1921	August 30, 1921	XXX
136	Raul Lelo Portela (1888-1972)	August 30, 1921	October 19, 1921	XXXI
-	Vasco Guedes de Vasconcelos (not sworn in) (1880-1950)	October 19, 1921	October 22, 1921	XXXII
137	António Augusto de Almeida Arez (1868-1942)	October 22, 1921	November 5, 1921	XXXII
138	Vasco Guedes de Vasconcelos (1880-1950)	November 5, 1921	December 16, 1921	XXXIII
139	Antonio de Abranches Ferrão (1883-1932)	December 16, 1921	February 6, 1922	XXXIV
140	João Catanho de Meneses (2nd time) (1854-1942)	February 6, 1922	February 7, 1922	XXXV
-	Vasco Borges (interim) (1882-1942)	February 7, 1922	February 18, 1922	XXXV
-	João Catanho de Meneses (2nd time continuation) (1854-1942)	February 18, 1922	December 7, 1922	XXXV
-	João Catanho de Meneses (2nd time continuation) (1854-1942)	February 18, 1922	December 7, 1922	XXXVI
141	António de Abranches Ferrão (2nd time) (1883-1932)	December 7, 1922	November 15, 1923	XXXVII
142	Artur Alberto da Cunha Camacho Lopes Cardoso (3rd time) (1881-1968)	November 15, 1923	December 18, 1923	XXXVIII
143	José Domingues dos Santos (1885-1958)	December 18, 1923	July 6, 1924	XXXIX
144	João Catanho de Meneses (3rd time) (1854-1942)	July 6, 1924	November 22, 1924	XL
145	Pedro Augusto Pereira de Castro (1867-n/d)	November 22, 1924	February 15, 1925	XLI
146	Adolfo Augusto de Oliveira Coutinho (1875-1950)	February 15, 1925	July 1, 1925	XLII
147	Augusto Casimiro Alves Monteiro (1861-1958)	July 1, 1925	December 17, 1925	XLIII
147	Augusto Casimiro Alves Monteiro (1861-1958)	July 1, 1925	December 17, 1925	XLIV
148	João Catanho de Meneses (4th time) (1854-1942)	December 17, 1925	May 29, 1926	XLV

=== Second Republic (1926-1974) ===
Military Dictatorship (1926-1928)

#	Minister of Justice and Cults (Birth-Death)	Beginning of the mandate	End of mandate	Government
-	Junta de Salvação Pública composed by: José Mendes Cabeçadas (President); Armando Humberto da Gama Ochôa; Jaime Pereira Rodrigues Baptista; Carlos de Jesus Vilhena	May 29, 1926	May 30, 1926	-
149	José Mendes Cabeçadas (acting until June 1) (1883-1965)	May 30, 1926	June 3, 1926	I
150	Manuel Rodrigues Júnior (1889-1946)	June 3, 1926	April 11, 1928	I
150	Manuel Rodrigues Júnior (1889-1946)	June 3, 1926	April 11, 1928	II
150	Manuel Rodrigues Júnior (1889-1946)	June 3, 1926	April 11, 1928	III
151	António Maria de Bettencourt Rodrigues (1854-1933)	April 11, 1928	April 18, 1928	III

==== National Dictatorship (1928-1933) ====
#	Minister of Justice and Cults (Birth-Death)	Beginning of the mandate	End of the mandate	Government
152	José da Silva Monteiro (1867-1940)	April 18, 1928	November 10, 1928	IV
153	Mário de Figueiredo (1890-1969)	November 10, 1928	July 8, 1929	V
154	Francisco Xavier da Silva Teles (1860-1930)	July 8, 1929	July 15, 1929	SAW
155	Luís Maria Lopes da Fonseca (1883-1974)	July 15, 1929	January 23, 1931	SAW
155	Luís Maria Lopes da Fonseca (1883-1974)	July 15, 1929	January 23, 1931	VII
156	Domingos Augusto Alves da Costa e Oliveira (acting) (1873-1957)	January 23, 1931	January 26, 1931	VII
157	José de Almeida Eusebio (1881-1945)	January 26, 1931	July 5, 1932	VII
158	Manuel Rodrigues Júnior (2nd time) (1889-1946)	July 5, 1932	April 11, 1933	VIII

==== New State (1933-1974) ====
#	Minister of Justice (Birth-Death)	Beginning of the mandate	End of mandate	Government
-	Manuel Rodrigues Júnior (2nd time continuation) (1889-1946)	April 11, 1933	October 23, 1934	I
-	Manuel Rodrigues Júnior (2nd time continuation) (1889-1946)	October 23, 1934	August 28, 1940	I
-	Manuel Rodrigues Júnior (2nd time continuation) (1889-1946)	October 23, 1934	August 28, 1940	II
159	Adriano Pais da Silva Vaz Serra (1903-1989)	August 28, 1940	September 6, 1944	II
160	Manuel Gonçalves Cavaleiro de Ferreira (1911-1992)	September 6, 1944	August 7, 1954	II
-	Vacant position	August 7, 1954	August 14, 1954	II
161	João de Matos Antunes Varela (1919-2005)	August 14, 1954	May 31, 1955	II
162	Fernando Andrade Pires de Lima (acting) (1906-1970)	May 31, 1955	June 30, 1955	II
163	João de Matos Antunes Varela (2nd time) (1919-2005)	June 30, 1955	September 22, 1967	II
164	Mário Júlio Brito de Almeida Costa (1927-2025)	September 22, 1967	November 7, 1973	II
164	Mário Júlio Brito de Almeida Costa (1927-2025)	September 22, 1967	November 7, 1973	III
165	António Maria de Mendonça Lino Neto (1913-1980)	November 7, 1973	April 25, 1974	III

=== Third Republic (1974-present) ===
#	Portrait	Name	Took office	Left office	Party	Prime Minister
166		Francisco Salgado Zenha (1923–1993)	16 May 1974	8 August 1975	PS	Adelino da Palma Carlos
166		Francisco Salgado Zenha (1923–1993)	16 May 1974	8 August 1975	PS	Vasco Gonçalves
167		Joaquim Rocha e Cunha (1913–1996)	8 August 1975	19 September 1975	Ind.	Vasco Gonçalves
168		João de Deus Pinheiro Farinha (1919–1994)	19 September 1975	23 July 1976	Ind.	José Pinheiro de Azevedo
169		António de Almeida Santos (1926–2016)	23 July 1976	30 January 1978	PS	Mário Soares
170		José Santos Pais (b. 1929)	30 January 1978	29 August 1978	Ind.	Mário Soares
171		Mário Raposo (1929–2013)	29 August 1978	22 November 1978	Ind.	Alfredo Nobre da Costa
172		Eduardo Silva Correia (1915–1991)	22 November 1978	1 August 1979	Ind.	Carlos Mota Pinto
173		Pedro Sousa Macedo (b. 1928)	1 August 1979	3 January 1980	Ind.	Maria de Lourdes Pintasilgo
174		Mário Raposo (1929–2013)	3 January 1980	9 January 1981	PSD	Francisco Sá Carneiro
174		Mário Raposo (1929–2013)	3 January 1980	9 January 1981	PSD	Diogo Freitas do Amaral
175		José Menéres Pimentel (1928–2014)	9 January 1981	9 June 1983	PSD	Francisco Pinto Balsemão
176		Rui Machete (b. 1940)	9 June 1983	15 February 1985	PSD	Mário Soares
177		Mário Raposo (1929–2013)	15 February 1985	17 August 1987	PSD	Mário Soares
177		Mário Raposo (1929–2013)	15 February 1985	17 August 1987	PSD	Aníbal Cavaco Silva
178		Fernando Nogueira (b. 1950)	17 August 1987	5 March 1990	PSD	Aníbal Cavaco Silva
179		Álvaro Laborinho Lúcio (1941–2025)	5 March 1990	28 October 1995	PSD	Aníbal Cavaco Silva
180		José Vera Jardim (b. 1939)	28 October 1995	25 October 1999	PS	António Guterres
181		António Costa (b. 1961)	25 October 1999	6 April 2002	PS	António Guterres
182		Celeste Cardona (b. 1951)	6 April 2002	17 July 2004	CDS	José Manuel Durão Barroso
183		José Pedro Aguiar-Branco (b. 1957)	17 July 2004	12 March 2005	PSD	Pedro Santana Lopes
184		Alberto Costa (b. 1947)	12 March 2005	26 October 2009	PS	José Sócrates
185		Alberto Martins (b. 1945)	26 October 2009	21 June 2011	PS	José Sócrates
186		Paula Teixeira da Cruz (b. 1960)	21 June 2011	30 October 2015	PSD	Pedro Passos Coelho
187		Fernando Negrão (b. 1955)	30 October 2015	26 November 2015	PSD	Pedro Passos Coelho
188		Francisca Van Dunem (b. 1955)	26 November 2015	30 March 2022	Ind.	António Costa
189		Catarina Sarmento e Castro (b. 1970)	30 March 2022	2 April 2024	Ind.	António Costa
190		Rita Júdice (b. 1973)	2 April 2024	Incumbent	Ind.	Luís Montenegro

== See also ==
- Judiciary of Portugal
- Justice ministry
- Lista de ministros da Justiça de Portugal (List of ministers of justice of Portugal)
- Politics of Portugal
