= José Bernardo =

Jose Bernardo may refer to:

- José Bernardo da Silva Cabral (1801–1869), Portuguese politician
- José-Miguel Bernardo (born 1950), Spanish mathematician and statistician
- José Bernardo Sánchez (1778–1833), Spanish missionary
- José Carlos Bernardo (1945–2018), Brazilian footballer
- José Bernardo (co-driver), Portuguese co-driver in 1973 Rallye de Portugal
