= INPI =

INPI may refer to:

- National Institute of Industrial Property (France) (Institut national de la propriété industrielle)
- National Industrial Property Institute (Portugal) (Instituto nacional da propriedade industrial)
- National Institute of Indigenous Peoples in Mexico (Instituto Nacional de los Pueblos Indígenas)

== See also ==
- Mexican Institute of Industrial Property (Instituto Mexicano de la Propiedad Industrial) (IMPI)
- Intellectual Property Office (disambiguation)
- Intellectual property organization
- Patent office
