= Industrial Property Office =

Industrial Property Office may refer to:

- Netherlands Industrial Property Office
- Norwegian Industrial Property Office

== See also ==
- Intellectual Property Office (disambiguation)
- Intellectual property organization
- National Industrial Property Institute (disambiguation)
- INPI (disambiguation)
- Patent office
