= António Campinos =

Portuguese civil servant

António Campinos is a Portuguese civil servant. He is the seventh and current president of the European Patent Office (EPO), a post he took up on 1 July 2018 for a five-year term. He was re-elected in 2022 for a second five-year term, which started on 1 July 2023. Before heading the EPO, he was executive director of the European Union Intellectual Property Office (EUIPO) from 1 October 2010 to 2018. Before 2010, he was in charge of Portugal's National Institute of Industrial Property. He is also a French citizen.

Preceded by Benoît Battistelli	President of the European Patent Office; 2018–present	Incumbent
