= Yves Lapierre =

Yves Lapierre may refer to:

- Yves Lapierre (composer) (1946–2026), Canadian composer, arranger and record producer
- Yves Lapierre (civil servant), French civil servant
