= Cabralism =

Period of Portuguese history, 1842–1846

Cabralism is the period from 1842 to 1846 when António Bernardo da Costa Cabral dominated Portuguese politics. Cabralism was characterized by the adoption of the constitutional doctrine contained in the restored Constitutional Charter of 1826, which was taken as a dogma to be scrupulously respected, thus creating a stable framework that was exploited by the government. The government was characterized by being a strong executive, decisively supported by the royal powers enshrined in the Charter, especially the reserve power vested in the sovereign.

== History ==
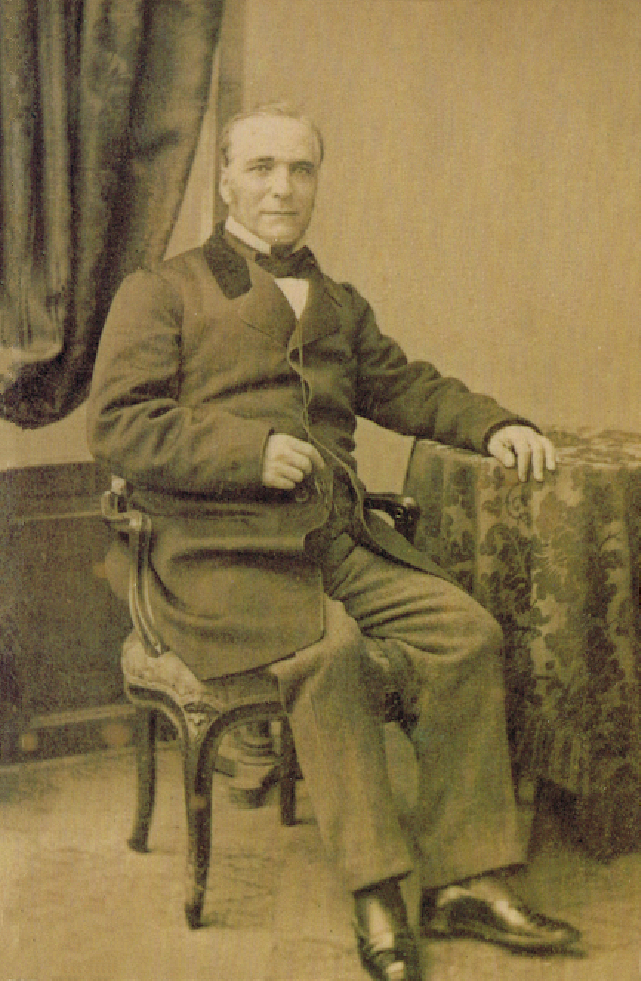
António Bernardo da Costa Cabral

With the express support of Queen Maria II, of whom Costa Cabral was considered a valedictorian, the government's parliamentary front was secured by an obedient majority, congregated in an exclusivist party and committed to maintaining, against the onslaughts of the left and the remnants of Miguelism, the order deemed necessary for the country's development.

One of the first reforms of Cabralism was administrative centralization, approving the Administrative Code of 1842. This was followed by the reform of Portugal's National Guards, one of the previous factors of instability, the resumption of relations with the Holy See and the control of foreign debt and the government deficit.

Cabralism attempted to launch an ambitious public works program, creating public-private partnerships with the creation of state creditor companies. On the social front, it legislated on public education and health, trying to modernize these sectors.

Having to take out a loan of 2400 escudos, an astronomical sum at the time, he was forced into a tax reform aimed at increasing state revenue, which began a rapid process of erosion of the popular support base for the government.

In a clear show of favor, Queen Maria II appointed Costa Cabral an effective Councillor of State (1843), a Peer of the Realm (1844) and elevated him to Count of Tomar (1845), for two lives. However, the rapid enrichment of Costa Cabral, who, from the position of a modest lawyer, in a few years became the holder of a considerable fortune, which included a palace capable of hosting the Queen, as well as the nepotism of which he was accused, since his brother José Bernardo da Silva Cabral, also made 1st Count of Tomar, was also accused of nepotism. Silva Cabral, who also became the 1st Count of Cabral, was one of the government's supporters (hence the name government of the Cabral), making Costa Cabral a figure hated by vast swathes of the population. When his other brother and his father also entered parliament, accusations of nepotism, clientelism and concussion in public tenders grew.

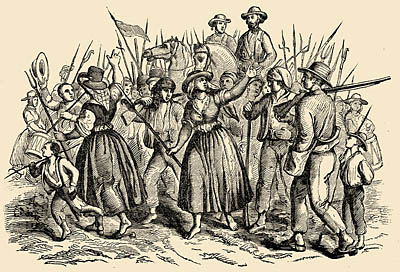
Maria da Fonte Revolution, in A Ilustração, v. II, 1846, p. 71.

When, in January 1846, the unstoppable increase in public spending and the consequent state deficit led to the state's credit being cut off, making bankruptcy imminent, Cabralism fell into agony. Thus, despite having completed the legislature, and having been the first government of Portuguese liberalism to achieve this feat, popular discontent was such that the slightest agitation threatened to result in an uprising. This is what happened in the spring of 1846 with the Maria da Fonte Revolution.

== The end of Cabralism ==
Faced with the spread of the popular uprising, the Queen was forced to dismiss Costa Cabral, who went into exile to Madrid. That was the end of Cabralism.

Despite all its shortcomings and corruption, in the end Cabralism was a necessary stage in Portuguese liberalism. Costa Cabral consolidated the liberal state, based on strong centralization and a complex bureaucracy. Based on the army, freemasonry, of which Costa Cabral was Grand Master of the Lusitanian Grand Orient, and clientele who benefited from the economic and financial policy, based on public works and development, Cabralism laid the foundations of the current Portuguese state, and many of its features have survived to the present day.

== See also ==
- António Bernardo da Costa Cabral
- José Bernardo da Silva Cabral
- Maria da Fonte Revolution
- Setembrismo
- September Revolution

== Bibliography ==
- Bonifácio, Maria de Fátima, História da Guerra Civil da Patuleia 1846-1847, Editorial Estampa, Lisboa, 1993 (ISBN 9723309270)
- Capela, José Viriato; Borralheiro, Rogério, A Revolução do Minho de 1846 e as reformas da administração. In: CONGRESSO DA MARIA DA FONTE, 150 ANOS, Póvoa de Lanhoso, 1996, História da Coragem Feita com Coração: Actas. Póvoa de Lanhoso, Câmara Municipal, 1996, pp. 169–184.
- Castelo Branco, Camilo, Maria da Fonte, Lisboa, Ulmeiro, 1986 (Com prefácio de Hélia Correia. Desta obra existem múltiplas edições).
- Coelho, José Abílio, Algumas notas sobre a revolução das mulheres de Fontarcada. In: CONGRESSO DA MARIA DA FONTE, 150 ANOS, Póvoa de Lanhoso, 1996, História da Coragem Feita com Coração: Actas. Póvoa de Lanhoso, Câmara Municipal, 1996, pp. 263–269.
- Gomes, João Augusto Marques, História da Revolução da Maria da Fonte, na colecção Biblioteca do Povo e das Escolas, (n.º 167), Lisboa.
- Vieira, Casimiro José, Apontamentos para a história da Revolução do Minho em 1846 ou da Maria da Fonte, Braga, Typographia Lusitana, 1883; Lisboa, Rolim, 1987 (edição facsimile da edição de 1883 com prefácio de José Manuel Sobral).
- Manuel Joaquim Pinheiro Chagas e José Barbosa Colen (editores), Historia de Portugal popular e illustrada, Lisboa, 1899-1909;
- Maria Filomena Mónica (coordenadora), Dicionário Biográfico Parlamentar (1834-1910) (volume I, pp. 491–494), Assembleia da República, Lisboa, 2005;
- M. M. T. Ribeiro, A restauração da Carta Constitucional: cabralismo e anticabralismo, in L. R. Torgal e J. L. Roque (editores), História de Portugal (5.º volume, pp. 107–119), Lisboa, Círculo de Leitores, 1993;
- Albano da Silveira Pinto e Augusto Romano Sanches de Baena (1.º visconde de Sanches de Baena), Resenha das Famílias Titulares e Grandes de Portugal, volume II, pp. 653 e seguintes.
