= Francisca Van Dunem =

Angolan-Portuguese lawyer and politician (born 1955)

Her Excellency Francisca Van Dunem
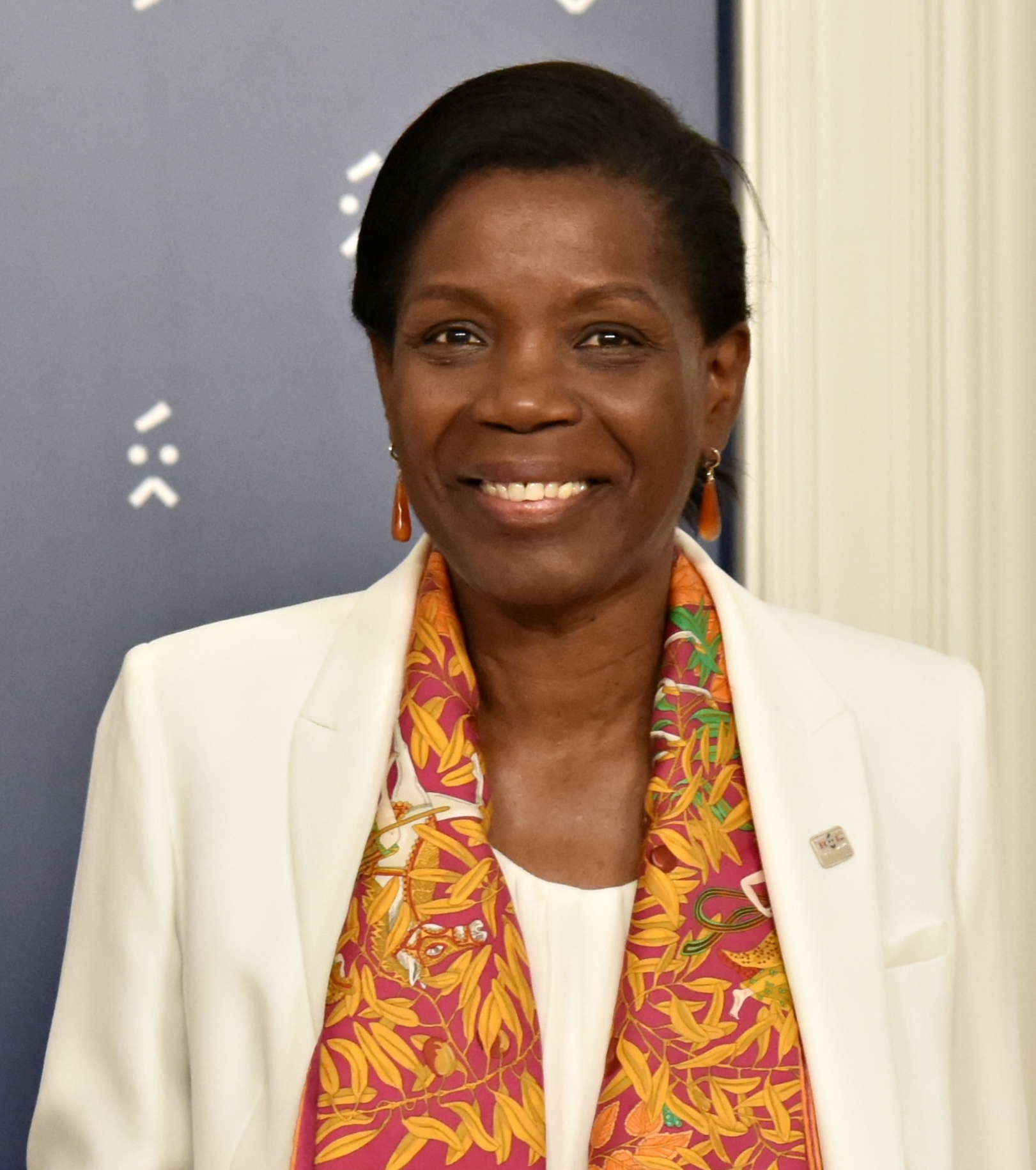
- Van Dunem in 2016

Minister of Justice
- In office 26 November 2015 – 30 March 2022
- Prime Minister: António Costa
- Preceded by: Fernando Negrão
- Succeeded by: Catarina Sarmento e Castro

Minister of Home Affairs
- In office 4 December 2021 – 30 March 2022
- Prime Minister: António Costa
- Preceded by: Eduardo Cabrita
- Succeeded by: José Luís Carneiro

Personal details
- Born: Francisca Eugénia da Silva Dias Van Dunem; 5 November 1955 (age 70) Luanda, Portuguese Angola
- Citizenship: Portugal • Angola
- Party: Independent
- Other political affiliations: MPLA (1974–1976)
- Spouse: Eduardo Paz Ferreira
- Children: 2
- Relatives: Fernando José de França Dias Van-Dúnem (godfather)
- Education: University of Lisbon
- Occupation: Jurist • Judge

Francisca Eugénia da Silva Dias Van Dunem (born 5 November 1955) is an Angolan-born Portuguese lawyer and politician who served as the Portuguese minister of Justice from 26 November 2015 to 30 March 2022, in António Costa's 21st and 22nd Constitutional Governments, and minister of Home Affairs from 4 December 2021 to 30 March 2022. Van Dunem was Portugal's first black government minister in history.

== Early life and education ==
Van Dunem was born in 1955 in Luanda, then the capital of the Portuguese Overseas Province of Angola. She went to Lisbon in the early 1970s in order to study law at the University of Lisbon. In April 1974, the Portuguese Estado Novo regime was overthrown by a left-wing military coup and in 1975 Angola become a newly independent communist state - the People's Republic of Angola. Her brother José Jacinto Van-Dúnem was murdered in a purge that occurred in Agostinho Neto's post-independence Angola that same year. Van Dunem did not return to Angola and pursued a family life and a professional career in Portugal.

Van Dunem holds a degree in law from the Faculty of Law of the University of Lisbon, awarded in 1977. She was subject to competitive examination for the Portuguese Public Prosecutor's office in 1979.

== Professional career ==
Van Dunem's professional activities included judicial activities such as Trainee Deputy Public Prosecutor (Lisbon and Loures courts) (1979–1980); Deputy Public Prosecutor (Lisbon Labour Court) (1980–1983); Deputy Public Prosecutor (Lisbon Criminal Court) (1983–1985); Deputy Public Prosecutor (Lisbon Public Prosecution Service) (1987–1989); member of the Principal State Prosecutor's private law firm (1989–2001); and Deputy Principal State Prosecutor, Director of the Lisbon Public Prosecution Service (from 2001).

Van Dunem first served as Minister of Justice in the 21st Portuguese government (2015–2019). In early 2021, she faced calls for resignation amid revelations that her ministry had overstated the qualifications of its nominee for Portugal's seat at the European Public Prosecutor's Office (EPPO).

On 4 December 2021 Van Dunem was nominated as Minister of Internal Administration after Eduardo Cabrita's resignation, heading both Ministries of Justice and Internal Administration.

== Personal life ==
Van Dunem is married and has one son. They live in the Greater Lisbon area.
