= Intellectual Property Office =

There are several organizations and public offices named Intellectual Property Office or Office for Intellectual Property, including:

- Barbados Corporate Affairs and Intellectual Property Office (CAIPO)
- Benelux Office for Intellectual Property (BOIP)
- Canadian Intellectual Property Office (CIPO)
- Ethiopian Intellectual Property Office (EIPO)
- Intellectual Property Office of Ireland (IPOI)
- Intellectual Property Office of the Philippines (IPOPHL)
- Intellectual Property Office (United Kingdom) (UK-IPO)
- Korean Intellectual Property Office (KIPO)
- State Intellectual Property Office of the People's Republic of China (SIPO)
- Taiwan Intellectual Property Office (TIPO)
- World Intellectual Property Office (WIPO)

== See also ==
- Intellectual property
- Intellectual property organization
- Industrial Property Office (disambiguation)
- National Industrial Property Institute (disambiguation) or INPI (disambiguation)
- Patent office
