= Benoît Battistelli =

French civil servant (born 1950)

President of the European Patent Office
- In office 2010–2018
- Preceded by: Alison Brimelow
- Succeeded by: António Campinos

Personal details
- Born: 12 July 1950 (age 76) Paris, France
- Education: Sciences Po, ÉNA
- Profession: Civil servant

Benoît Battistelli (born 12 July 1950 in Paris, France) is a French civil servant, former president of the European Patent Office (EPO) (2010-2018), and former head of the French National Industrial Property Institute (INPI).

== Career ==
Benoît Battistelli graduated from the École Nationale d'Administration (ÉNA, English: National School of Administration) in 1978. From 1978 to 2002, he held various posts in French government departments and the French embassies in Italy, India, Poland and Turkey. Later, from June 2002 to April 2004, he was assistant director of staff of Nicole Fontaine, former President of the European Parliament.

From 12 May 2004 to June/July 2010, he headed (more precisely, he was the directeur général, i.e. chief executive officer) the French National Industrial Property Institute (INPI, standing for Institut national de la propriété industrielle in French), in charge of patents, trademarks and industrial design rights.

Battistelli chaired the Supervisory Board of the European Patent Academy from July 2005 to July 2008. He was also chairman of the Administrative Council of the European Patent Organisation. He was elected to the post of Deputy Chairman of the Administrative Council of the European Patent Organisation on 5 December 2006 for a three-year term. Then, later the Administrative Council appointed him as its Chairman for a three-year term, from 5 March 2009 until March 2012, although his election in March 2010 as President of the European Patent Office meant that he had to step down as Chairman of the Administrative Council.

In 2008, he had been named as one of the potential candidates to succeed Kamil Idris to lead the World Intellectual Property Organization (WIPO), but Francis Gurry was eventually selected for the post.

=== President of the EPO ===
On 1 March 2010 he was elected president of the European Patent Office (EPO), after a long and controversial series of meetings of the Administrative Council. He took up the post on 1 July 2010, for a term of five years. He was the sixth president of the EPO, the second Frenchman to hold the post, and the first president who has previously held the post of Chairman of the Administrative Council.

Under Battistelli's tenure, the EPO played an important role in the preparatory work for the introduction of the unitary patent, which came into existence on 1 June 2023. In this context, Battistelli was listed in 2014 by the Managing Intellectual Property magazine as one of the 50 most influential people in intellectual property. In June 2014, Battistelli's term of office as EPO president was extended for a further three years until 30 June 2018, amidst concerns from the EPO staff. In July 2018, he was succeeded by António Campinos.

==== Discontent within the EPO staff ====
Battistelli's presidency has encountered discontent among the staff and has been marked by industrial actions with an escalation of the conflict in 2014. Discontent on the part of staff has been attributed to Battistelli's style of management which, according to reports in the German newspapers Die Zeit and Die Welt, was perceived by staff as being unduly autocratic and unsuited to a European intergovernmental body such as the EPO, and, according to an article in the French newspaper Le Monde, has been brought in relation with suicides among the EPO staff since 2013. Battistelli's management style has also been criticized in the Dutch newspaper De Telegraaf, and by Philip Cordery, member of the French National Assembly. In an interview to the German business lawyer journal JUVE, Siegfried Bross, former judge at the Federal Constitutional Court of Germany, expressed the view that EPO's organization giving its president excessive powers is "principally incompatible with the European Convention on Human Rights (ECHR)" and that EPO's president, Benoît Battistelli, acted in 2015 against an EPO staff member "without legal legitimacy".

On 9 March 2018 a petition signed by 924 patent examiners denounced "the submission to constraints that are no longer compatible with fulfilling appropriately our duties within the Search and Examination divisions". They wrote: “We are far too often put in front of the dilemma of either working according to the European Patent Convention and respecting the examiner’s guidelines, or issuing 'products' as our hierarchy demands".

==== Computer tapping controversy ====
In June 2015, shortly before a meeting of the EPO President with the European Parliament, news broke of a controversial computer tapping action which apparently took place at the EPO towards the end of 2014. An article published in the German newspaper Süddeutsche Zeitung stated that it had obtained an internal report which showed that the EPO had tapped two publicly accessible computers that had been identified as a source for leaked information. The systems were placed under surveillance using cameras and keylogging and this led to the suspension of a member of staff. These events led the Bavarian Data Protection Commissioner, Thomas Petri, and the Federal German Data Protection Commissioner, Andrea Voßhoff, to raise concerns regarding data protection matters at the EPO.

=== Local political life ===
As of 2014, he was also town councillor (French: "conseiller municipal") of the French municipality of Saint-Germain-en-Laye (Yvelines).

== Honorary degrees ==
In 2013, Battistelli received an honorary professorship from Renmin University of China, Beijing, and, in 2014, the Menéndez Pelayo International University in Santander, Spain, awarded him an honorary doctorate.

Government offices
Preceded by ?	Head of the French National Institute of Industrial Property; 2004–2010	Succeeded by Yves Lapierre
Positions in intergovernmental organisations
Preceded by Roland Grossenbacher	Chairman of the Administrative Council of the European Patent Organisation; 2009–2010	Succeeded by Jesper Kongstad
Preceded by Alison Brimelow	President of the European Patent Office; 2010–2018	Succeeded by António Campinos
