= Rita Júdice =

Portuguese lawyer and politician (born 1973)

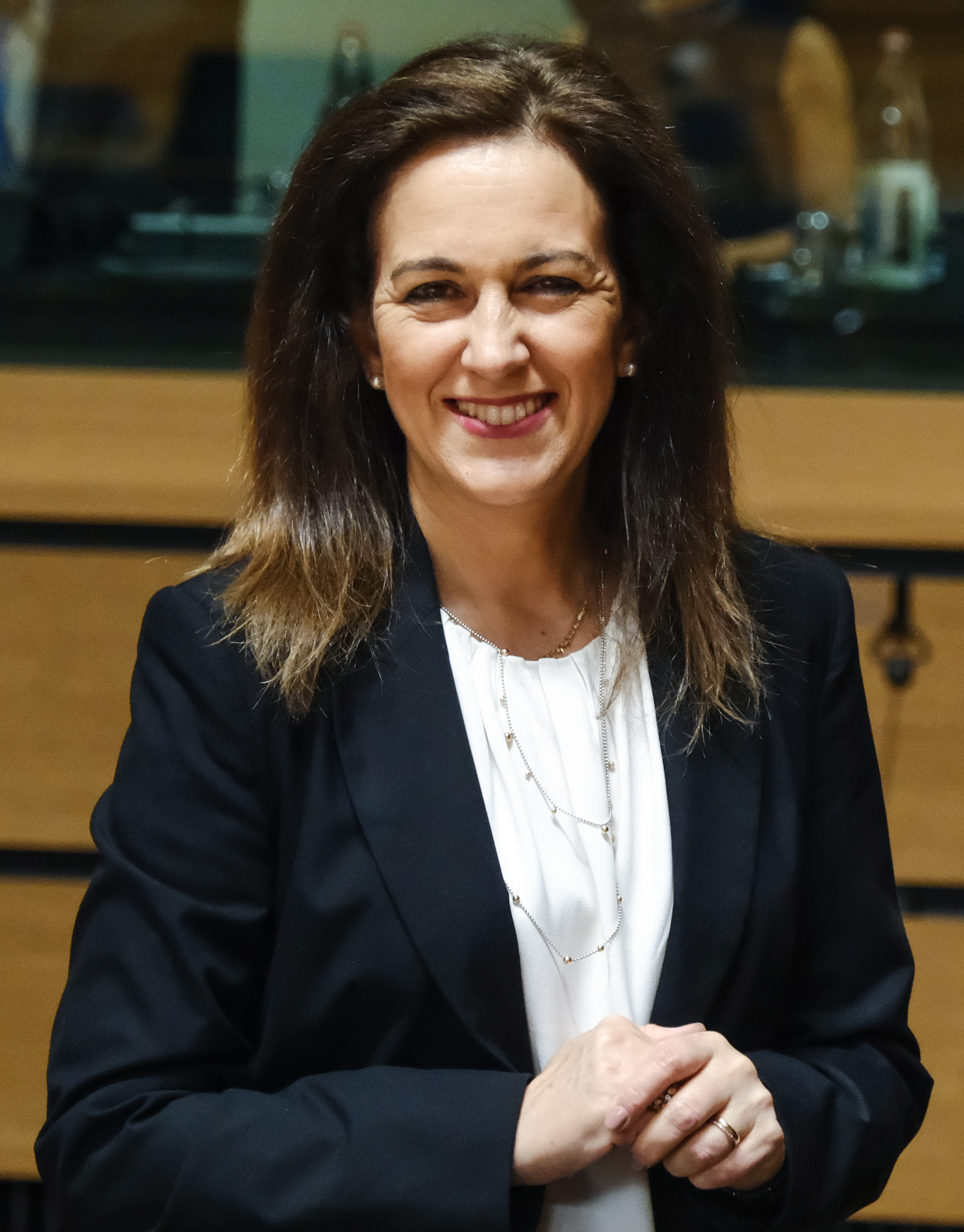
- Júdice in 2024

Minister of Justice
- Incumbent
- Assumed office 2 April 2024
- Prime Minister: Luís Montenegro
- Preceded by: Catarina Sarmento e Castro

Member of the Assembly of the Republic
- In office 26 March 2024 – 2 April 2024
- Constituency: Coimbra

Personal details
- Born: Rita Fragoso de Rhodes Alarcão Júdice; 8 December 1973 (age 52) Sé Nova, Coimbra, Portugal
- Party: Independent
- Other political affiliations: Democratic Alliance (2024–present)
- Children: 3
- Parent: José Miguel Júdice (father)
- Education: Catholic University of Portugal
- Occupation: Lawyer • politician

Rita Fragoso de Rhodes Alarcão Júdice de Abreu e Mota (born 8 December 1973) is a Portuguese lawyer and politician. She was elected as a member of the Assembly of the Republic in 2024 for the Coimbra constituency and again in the May 2025 election. She has been Minister of Justice since 2024, in the XXIV Constitutional Government, led by Luís Montenegro.

She has a degree in Law from the Portuguese Catholic University, Lisbon School (1997). She was a partner at the law firm PLMJ, founded by her father José Miguel Júdice, from 2013 to 2023 where she was co-coordinator of the Real estate and Tourism area.

Between 1998 and 2023 she worked as a lawyer in the area of real estate law, also at PLMJ. She is a member of the executive committee of the Urban Land Institute (ULI) Portugal and an associate of Women in Real Estate (WIRE Portugal).
