= Catarina Sarmento e Castro =

Portuguese jurist and politician (born 1970)

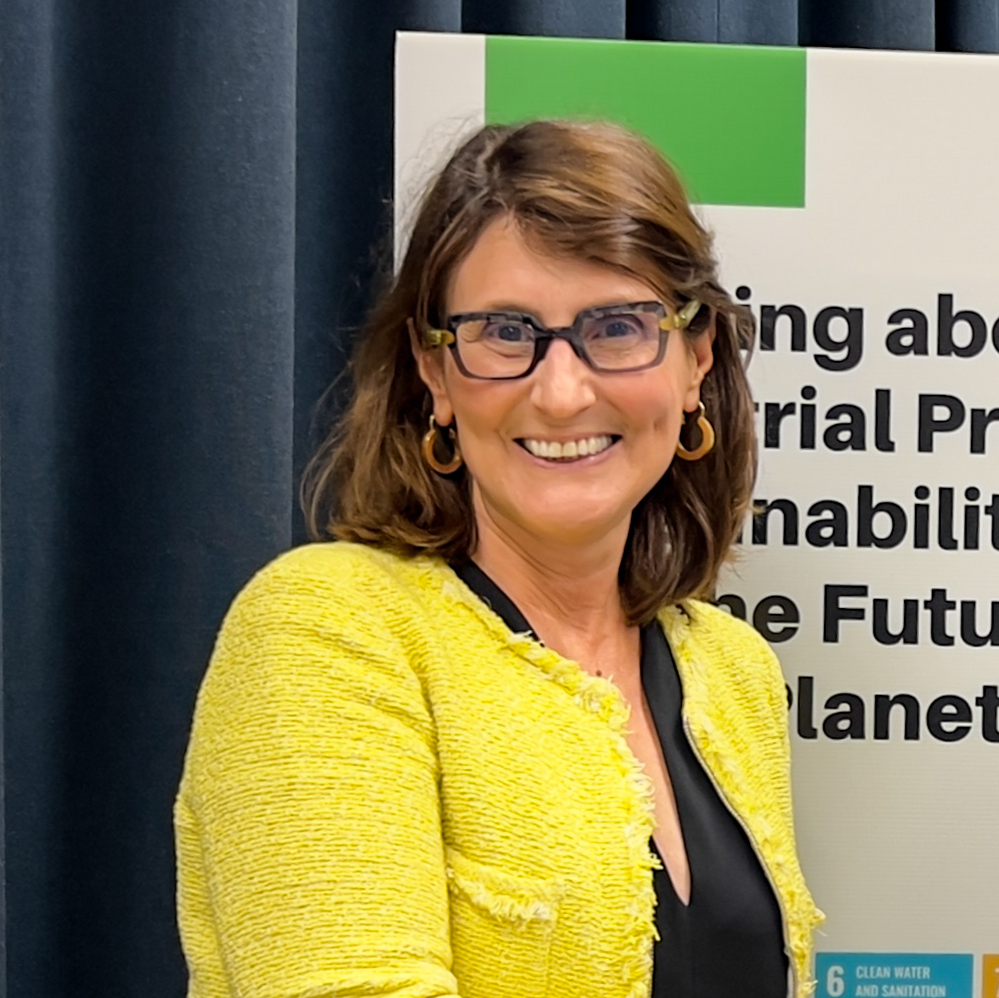
- Sarmento e Castro in 2023

Minister of Justice
- In office 30 March 2022 – 2 April 2024
- Prime Minister: António Costa
- Preceded by: Francisca Van Dunem
- Succeeded by: Rita Júdice

Secretary of State for Human Resources and Former Combatants
- In office 26 October 2019 – 30 March 2022
- Prime Minister: António Costa
- Preceded by: Office established
- Succeeded by: Office abolished

Judge of the Constitutional Court
- In office 4 February 2010 – 2 April 2019
- Preceded by: Mário Torres
- Succeeded by: Mariana Canotilho

Personal details
- Born: 16 May 1970 (age 56) Coimbra, Portugal
- Party: Socialist Party (2019–present)
- Other political affiliations: Independent (until 2019)
- Spouse: Guilherme da Silva Gomes
- Education: University of Coimbra

Catarina Teresa Rola Sarmento e Castro (born 16 May 1970) is a Portuguese jurist and politician. As a member of the Portuguese Socialist Party (PS), she became a deputy in the Portuguese Assembly of the Republic in the January 2022 Portuguese legislative election, representing Leiria. Between 2019 and 2022 she served as Secretary of State for Human Resources and Former Combatants. A professor in the Faculty of Law at the University of Coimbra, she has also served as a judge in the Constitutional Court. She was appointed Minister of Justice in March 2022, following the 2022 Portuguese legislative election, when the PS won an overall majority, but lost the position after the March 2024 elelction, when the PS was defeated and the Democratic Alliance formed the government.

== Early life and education ==
Catarina Teresa Rola Sarmento e Castro was born in Coimbra on 16 May 1970. Her father was Osvaldo Alberto do Rosário Sarmento e Castro, a former Socialist Party deputy in the Assembly of the Republic. She obtained undergraduate and master's degrees, as well as a PhD, from the Faculty of Law at the University of Coimbra and also studied for a postgraduate diploma at the Université catholique de Louvain in Belgium, with a dissertation entitled The notion of victim in the European Convention of the Rights of Man.

== Career ==
Sarmento e Castro has been teaching at the University of Coimbra since 1999 and is now an assistant professor. Courses she has taught have included constitutional law and political science; police law; human rights; database protection; administrative courts; public procurement; and labour law. She has addressed these issues in various publications. She has also taught at the NOVA University Lisbon, the University of Lisbon and the Catholic University of Portugal.

Among her other roles, Sarmento e Castro has been a member of the advisory board of the Attorney General's Office and a member of the Superior Council of Administrative and Fiscal Courts. In 2010 she was elected to be a judge at the Constitutional Court, for a term of nine years. She has also been a member of the National Data Protection Commission. On 26 October 2019, she became the new Secretary of State for Human Resources and Former Combatants in the Ministry of National Defence.

Sarmento e Castro was elected to the Portuguese National Assembly in the January 2022 election. Standing for the Socialist Party (PS) she was third on the list of PS candidates for Leiria, in which the PS won five seats. Nationally, the PS won an overall majority of seats. Subsequently, she was appointed Minister of Justice.

Political offices
Preceded by Francisca Van Dunem	Minister of Justice; 2022–present	Incumbent
