= National Institute of Industrial Property (France) =

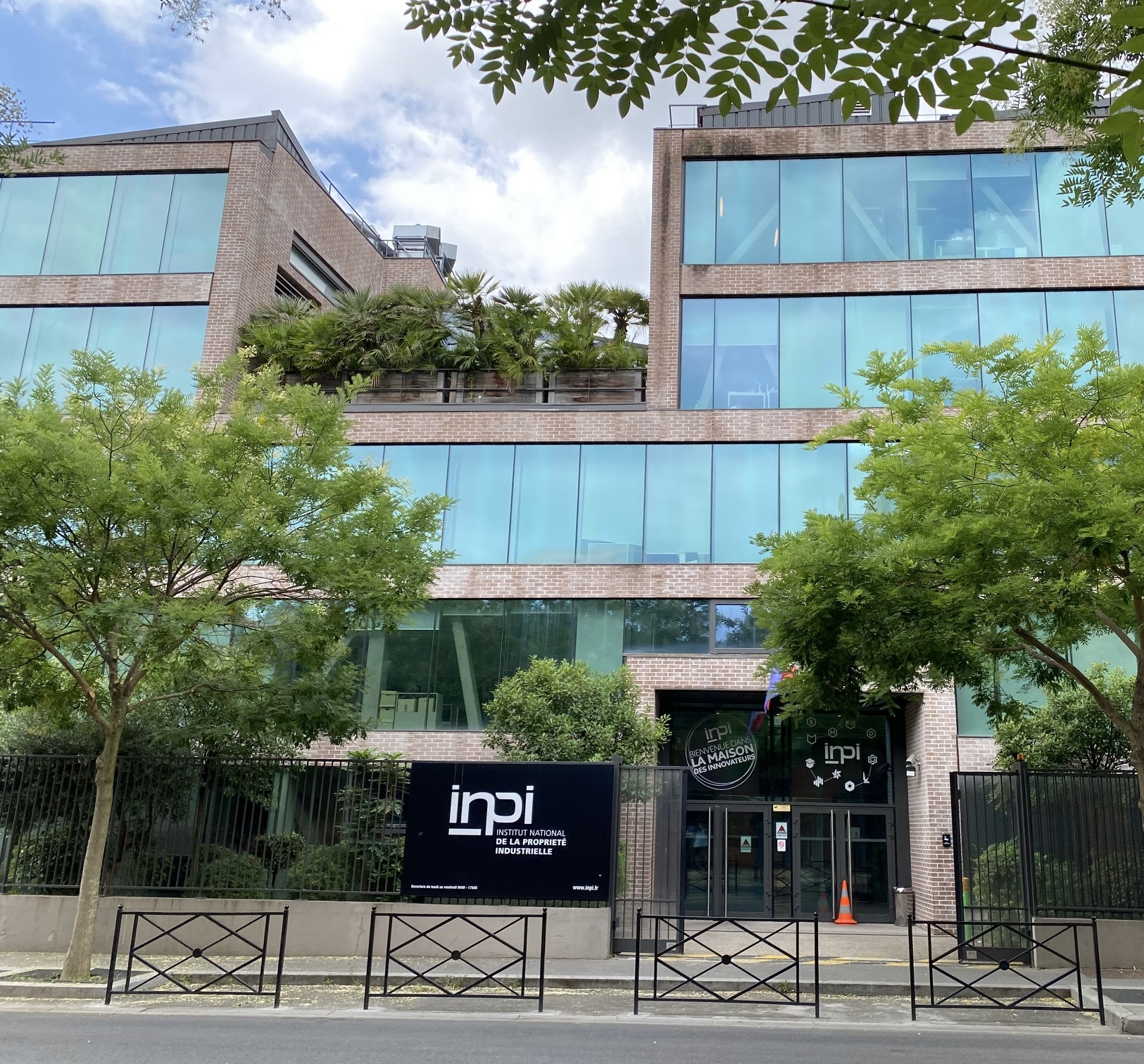
- Type: Governmental organization
- Headquarters: Courbevoie, Paris, France
- Website: www.inpi.fr

The National Industrial Property Institute (French: Institut national de la propriété industrielle, pronounced [ɛ̃stity nɑsjɔnal də la pʁɔpʁijete ɛ̃dystʁijɛl]; abbr. INPI) is the national intellectual property office of France, in charge of patents, trademarks and industrial design rights. It is a department of France's Ministry of Economics and Finance. INPI's headquarters is in Courbevoie.

== See also ==
- Soleau envelope, proof of priority available for the French territory at the INPI

=== Directors ===
- Georges Vianès (1975–1982)
- Benoît Battistelli (?–2010)
- Yves Lapierre (2010–2016)
- Romain Soubeyran (2016-2018)
- Pascal Faure
