= António Bernardo da Costa Cabral, 1st Marquis of Tomar =

Portuguese politician

His Excellency The Marquis of Tomar
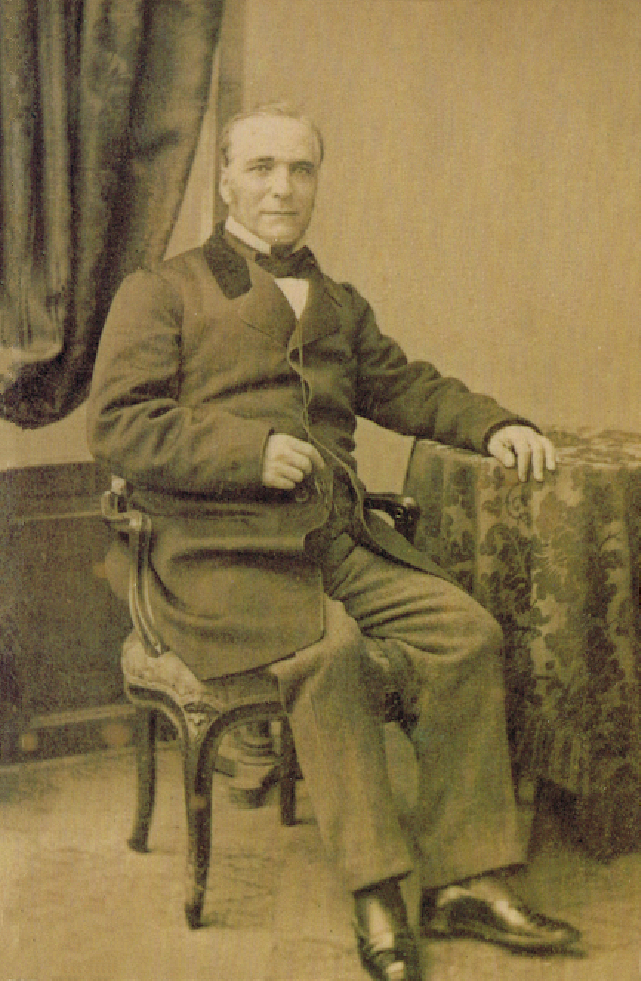

Prime Minister of Portugal
- In office 18 June 1849 – 26 April 1851
- Monarchs: Maria II and Fernando II
- Preceded by: Duke of Saldanha
- Succeeded by: Duke of Terceira

Personal details
- Born: 9 May 1803 Fornos de Algodres, Kingdom of Portugal
- Died: 1 September 1889 (aged 86) Porto, Kingdom of Portugal
- Party: Chartist

António Bernardo da Costa Cabral, 1st Count and 1st Marquis of Tomar (9 May 1803 – 1 September 1889) was a Portuguese 19th century statesman.

== Early life ==
Born in Fornos de Algodres he trained as a lawyer in Coimbra and was later appointed as a judge. A liberal, he earned a mixed reputation of fear and admiration.

== Career ==
He was appointed Governor of Lisbon in 1836 and was a confidant of Queen Maria II of Portugal. The year he was appointed, he used force to put down radical mobs in Lisbon (the Rossio massacre). He restored diplomatic relations with the Vatican and re-introduced a conservative Constitutional Charter. Following an 1842 coup d'état, he was appointed as Minister and Secretary for Royal State Affairs (the equivalent of a today's interior minister) in 1843. In 1846 famine led to the peasant revolt of Maria da Fonte in the north of Portugal, and he was removed from office. He fled to England but was restored to power in 1848. Again due to his unpopularity and the now poor economic state of Portugal he was replaced for a second time by the Duque de Saldanha in 1851.

== Later life ==
Cabral, at the request of the Duke of Saldanha and Rodrigues Sampaio, then, respectively, President of the Ministry and Minister of Foreign Affairs, was appointed to direct the legation of Portugal to the Holy See, arriving in Rome in July 1870, even before the Portuguese takeover. of that city by the troops of Victor Emanuel II.

As the Italian troops attacked the walls of Rome in September, the diplomatic corps accredited to the Vatican was placed in a delicate situation, forced to share the hardships and risks of the siege. The risks grew with the entry into Rome of hundreds of men who had been exiled by the pontifical government for their liberal ideas, creating a favorable situation for a popular uprising that any pretext would cause to explode.

Costa Cabral, in this difficult situation assumed the leadership of the diplomatic corps. The effectiveness of his action was such that the French chargé d'affaires translated, in these words, the recognition that the Portuguese diplomat inspired in him: Monsieur le Comte, vous nous avez sauvés.

So great was his prestige that Pope Pius IX, despite not admiring him, asked him to serve as an intermediary in his negotiations with General Raffaele Cadorna, whose camp was outside Porta Pia. During these negotiations, he risked his life, since once on his way from the Vatican to the headquarters of the besieger, when crossing the Ponte Sant'Angelo in his carriage, he found himself surrounded by a threatening crowd that almost lynched him. .

But despite the services provided to the Vatican, the curia, after the danger had passed, maintained relations with Costa Cabral marked by some reserve, since the Portuguese diplomat, a supporter of liberalism and modern ideas, did not agree with the intransigence and reactionary attitude of Pius IX. In addition, the Count of Tomar had created a unique situation for himself, since, despite being a legate with the Pope, he attended receptions at the court of the King of Italy meanwhile installed in the Quirinal Palace.

At the end of 1877, with the death of Pius IX predicted, Costa Cabral was elevated to the rank of ambassador, so that, with the representatives of the other three former Catholic nations, France, Austria-Hungary and Spain, he could eventually exercise the right of veto. in the election of the new pope, if Portuguese interests so required.

As Pius IX died on 7 February 1878, to succeed him, on 20 February, the Archbishop of Perugia, Gioacchino Pecci, was elected, who took the name of Pope Leo XIII, who proved to be a friend of the new ambassador. That same year, a royal decree, written in praiseworthy terms by António Rodrigues Sampaio, elevated Costa Cabral to the rank of 1st Marquis of Tomar.

On 6 February 1885, his wife, the Marquise of Tomar, honorary lady of Queen D. Maria Pia, died in Rome. The following summer the Marquis left Rome for Castellammare di Stabia, on the outskirts of Naples, accompanied by his daughter. There he fell seriously ill, leaving for Portugal in early September, aboard the corvette Estefânia, then under the command of his son Fernando Augusto da Costa Cabral.

Having returned seriously ill, he stayed away from political life, trying to recover his lost health. And it was for health reasons that in July 1889, accompanied by his daughter, he left for Foz do Douro. He died in that locality on 1 September immediately. Funeral arrangements were made for him in the church at Foz, and his body was taken to Lisbon, where on 4 September it was deposited in a family tomb in the Prazeres cemetery.

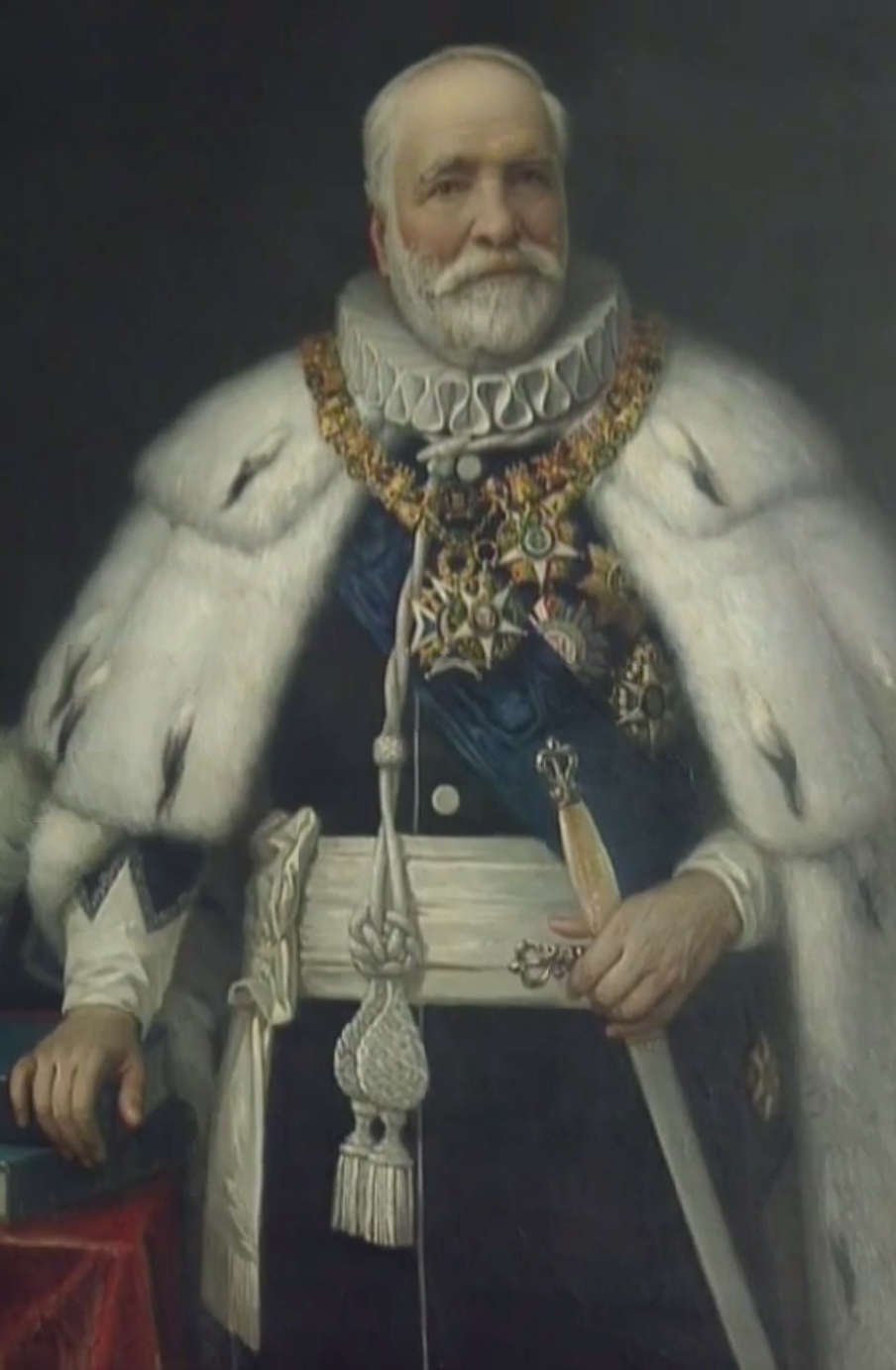
Portrait of the Marquis of Tomar wearing the gala dress of the Peers of the Realm, in the Town Hall of Fornos de Algodres.

The Marquis of Tomar was a Peer of the kingdom and a State Councilor. He was awarded the Grand Cross of the Military Order of Christ and the Order of the Immaculate Conception of Vila Viçosa, with the Grand Cross of the Imperial Order of the Rose of Brazil, with the medals of the Order of St. Gregory the Great, of the Order of the White Eagle of Russia, Order of Pius IX of the Holy See, Order of Saints Maurice and Lazarus, Italy, Order of Glory 1st class, in diamonds, Turkey, Order of Leopold I of Belgium, Saxe-Ernestine House Order, of the Order of Charles III of Spain, the latter with a large-number necklace.

The title of Count was granted to him by decree of 8 September 1845, issued by Queen Maria II, and that of Marquis by decree of 11 July 1878, issued by D. Luís. His coat of arms was the same as that of his brother, José Bernardo da Silva Cabral, 1st Count of Cabral.

== See also ==
- Cabralism
- List of Portuguese Prime Ministers
- Marquis of Tomar
- Count of Tomar

Political offices
Preceded by Duke of Saldanha	Prime Minister of Portugal; 1849–1851	Succeeded by Duke of Terceira
