= Yves Lapierre (civil servant) =

French civil servant

Yves Lapierre is a French civil servant, who was the directeur général (chief executive officer) of the French National Institute of Industrial Property (INPI, standing for Institut national de la propriété industrielle in French), the national intellectual property office of France, in charge of patents, trademarks and industrial design rights, from 2010 to 2016.

Lapierre graduated from the École Polytechnique and received a PhD in physics. Prior to becoming head of the INPI, he notably worked at the Commissariat à l’énergie atomique (CEA, English: Atomic Energy Commission) and at AREVA's subsidiary Technicatome (TA), from which he resigned as CEO in 2010.

Government offices
Preceded by Benoît Battistelli	Head of the French National Institute of Industrial Property; 2010–2016	Succeeded by Romain Soubeyran
