= José Bernardo da Silva Cabral =

Portuguese politician

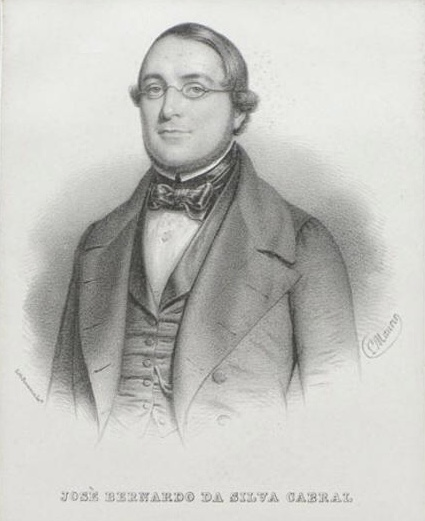
- José Bernardo da Silva Cabral

Personal details
- Born: July 27, 1801 Fornos de Algodres, Guarda District, Kingdom of Portugal
- Died: March 25, 1869 (aged 67) Lumiar, Lisbon District, Kingdom of Portugal
- Education: University of Coimbra
- Occupation: Politician
- Awards: Commander of the Order of the Immaculate Conception of Vila Viçosa

José Bernardo da Silva Cabral (Fornos de Algodres, Algodres, 27 July 1801—Lumiar, 25 March 1869), 1.° Count of Cabral, was a Portuguese politician.

== Biography ==
=== Early years ===
Bernardo Cabral was born on 27 July 1801 in Fornos de Algodres in the Kingdom of Portugal.

=== Career ===
Fidalgo of the Portuguese Royal House, by charter of 21 December 1843, Bachelor in Canons from the Faculty of Canons of the University of Coimbra, magistrate, Minister and Secretary of State, several times Legislator to the Cortes, Peer of the Realm and His Most Faithful Majesty's Council, was an important Cartista politician who, with his brother António Bernardo da Costa Cabral, he was an important figure during the Cabralism era and led the Cabrais government, against which the Maria da Fonte Revolution took place. After the Patuleia, he occupied the most right-wing position in the liberal political sphere and came into open conflict with his brother, celebrating the latter's departure from the government caused by the Regeneration. In fact, José Bernardo had lost all of his political influence by 1851.

He was Commander of the Order of the Immaculate Conception of Vila Viçosa on March 21, 1840.

Between 1850 and 1855 he was the 7th Grand Commander of the Supreme Council of the Grand Orient of Portugal and the 16th Grand Master of the Grand Orient of Portugal.

=== Death ===
He died at the age of 67 on 25 March 1869 in Lumiar and was buried in the Prazeres Cemetery in a family grave.
