= National Industrial Property Institute (Portugal) =

Coordinates: 38°42′31″N 9°07′55″W

- INPI
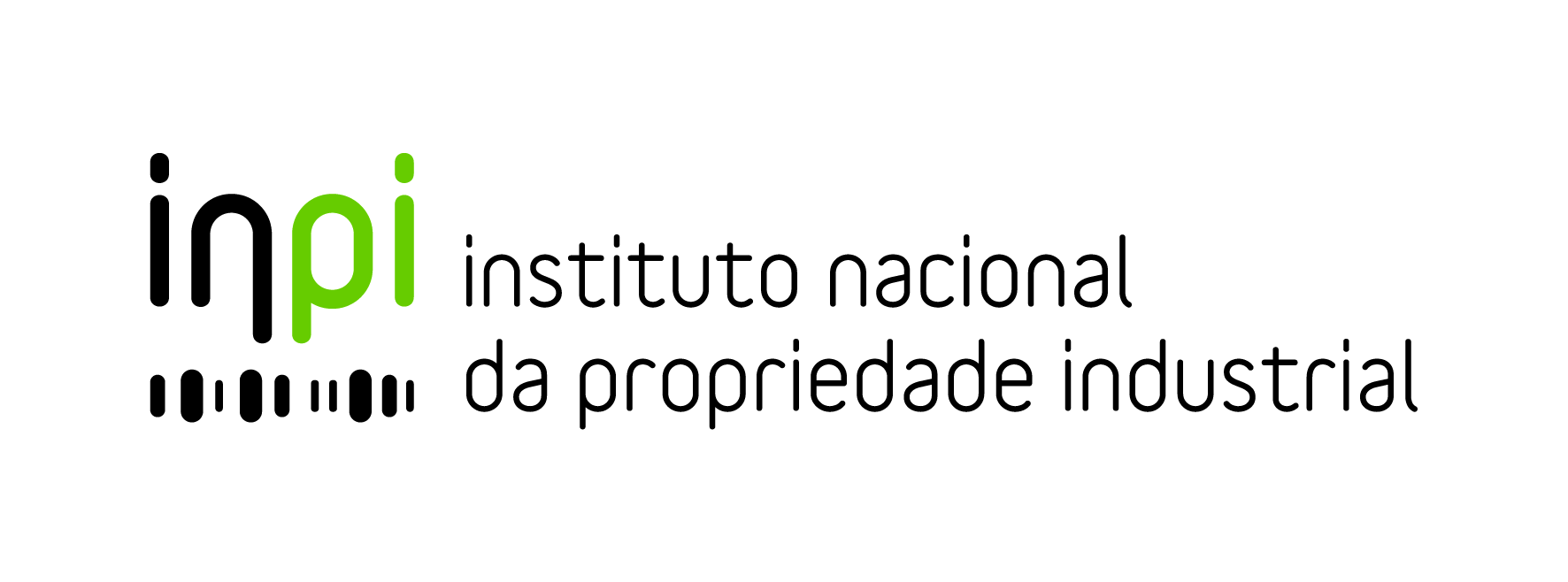

Agency overview
- Formed: 1976
- Preceding agency: Industrial Property Agency
- Headquarters: Lisbon, Portugal
- Employees: 104
- Agency executive: Maria Leonor Trindade, President of the Directive Council
- Parent agency: Ministry of Justice
- Website: www.inpi.pt

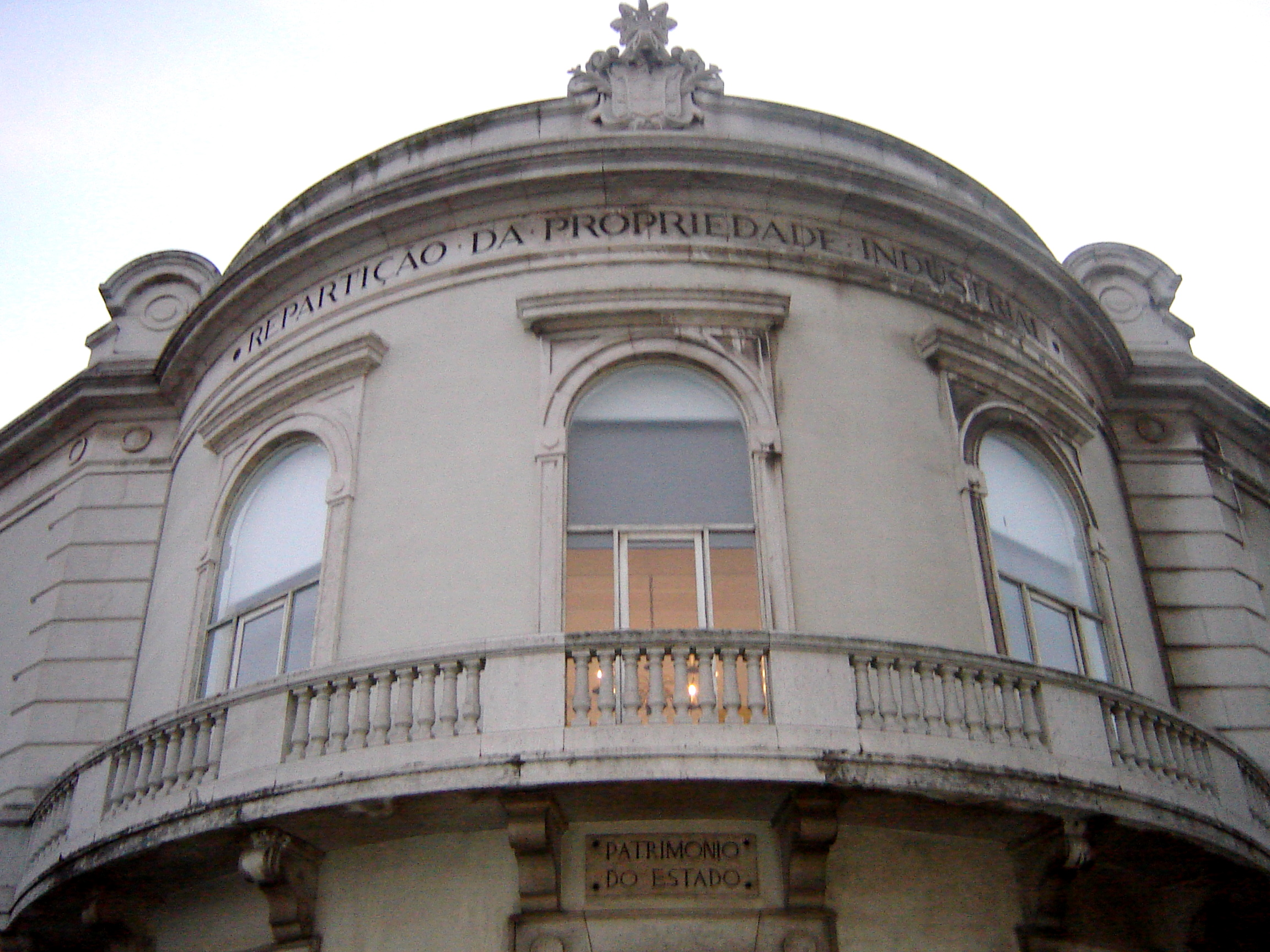
Main building of INPI in Lisbon

The National Industrial Property Institute or the Portuguese Institute of Industrial Property, in Portuguese Instituto Nacional da Propriedade Industrial, known also by its acronym INPI, is the Portuguese office which deals with the protection of trademarks, patents, utility models and industrial design. Its headquarters is in downtown Lisbon.

== History ==
The creation of the National Institute of Industrial Property (INPI) in 1976 envisioned the formation of an effective and efficient organization, one that would provide a quality government service as well as promote partnerships with companies, and support competition based on innovation.

It was created under the jurisdiction of the Ministry of Foreign Trade on 28 July 1976, as a reform on the old Industrial Property Agency. INPI is now an Autonomous Government Institution, with legal personality, as well as administrative and financial autonomy, and independent assets. It functions under the supervision and guidance of the Minister of Justice, with regards to the definition of specific policies relating to industrial property.

== See also ==
- Patent office
