= Patent offices in Europe =

European patent law is characterized by the coexistence of

1. national patent systems, and thus national patent offices and national courts;
2. a European patent system associated with the European Patent Convention (EPC), in the context of which the European Patent Office (EPO) grants European patents through a central examination procedure;
3. a Eurasian patent system associated with the Eurasian Patent Convention (EAPC), in the context of which the Eurasian Patent Office (EAPO) grants Eurasian patents through a central examination procedure; and
4. a Unified Patent Court (UPC) competent for the member states of the Unified Patent Court Agreement (UPCA).

The enforcement of European patents is conducted and decided either at a national level, i.e. before national courts, or at the UPC level, for European patents with unitary effect and European patents that have not been opted out. The patent offices in Europe therefore include, on the one hand, the plurality of national patent offices and, on the other hand, the EPO and the EAPO. See also European patent law.

== See also ==
- International Patent Institute (defunct institute)
- Nordic Patent Institute (NPI)
- World Intellectual Property Organization (WIPO)
