= Cases C-146/13 and C-147/13 =

Decisions of the European Court of Justice

- European Court of Justice

Submitted 22 March 2013 Decided 5 May 2015
- Full case name: Kingdom of Spain v European Parliament and Council of the European Union; Kingdom of Spain v Council of the European Union
- Case: C-146/13, C-147/13
- ECLI: ECLI:EU:C:2015:298
- Case type: Actions for Annulment
- Chamber: Grand chamber

Ruling
- Cases dismissed

Court composition
- Judge-Rapporteur; M. Ilešič
- President; V. Skouris
- Judges: K. Lenaerts; R. Silva; A. Ó Caoimh; C. Vajda; S. Rodin; A. Borg Barthet; J. Malenovský; E. Levits; E. Jarašiūnas; C.G. Fernlund; J.L. da Cruz Vilaça
- Advocate General; Yves Bot

Legislation affecting
- Unitary patent regulations

In decisions in the cases C-146/13 and C-147/13 issued in May 2015, the European Court of Justice (ECJ) rejected two challenges by Spain against the legality of both unitary patent regulations. The decisions are significant because these legal challenges were regarded as "the last serious obstacle to the Unitary Patent Package being implemented", "provided the necessary number of ratifications of the Unified Patent Court Agreement occur (13 including UK, France and Germany)."

In case C-146/13, Spain challenged Regulation (EU) No 1257/2012 implementing enhanced cooperation in the area of the creation of unitary patent protection, and in case C-147/13, Regulation No 1260/2012 of 17 December 2012, implementing enhanced cooperation in the area of the creation of unitary patent protection with regard to the applicable translation arrangements, was challenged.
