= European patent law =

European patent law covers a range of legislations including national patent laws, the Strasbourg Convention of 1963, the European Patent Convention of 1973, the Unified Patent Court Agreement (UPCA), and a number of European Union directives and regulations. For some states in Eastern Europe, the Eurasian Patent Convention applies.

Patents having effect in most European states may be obtained either nationally, via national patent offices, or via a centralised patent prosecution process at the European Patent Office (EPO). The EPO is a public international organisation established by the European Patent Convention (EPC). The EPO is neither a European Union nor a Council of Europe institution. A patent granted by the EPO, which is called a "European patent", can be turned either into a bundle of independent national European patents ("bundle European patent") or into a European unitary patent ("European patent with unitary effect") covering multiple countries. A bundle European patent is either enforceable before national courts according to different national legislations and procedures or before the Unified Patent Court (UPC) in countries participating in the UPCA and if the patent has not been opted out from the exclusive jurisdiction of the UPC. European unitary patents are enforceable exclusively before the UPC. Eurasian patents are granted by the Eurasian Patent Office and become after grant only independent national Eurasian patents enforceable before national courts.

European patent law is also shaped by international agreements such as the World Trade Organization's Agreement on Trade-Related Aspects of Intellectual Property Rights (TRIPs Agreement), the Patent Law Treaty (PLT) and the London Agreement.

== Types of patent protection in Europe ==
Regional patent convention membership in Europe Parties to the European Patent Convention Extension states by the European Patent Convention Parties to the Eurasian Patent Convention Other European States

A characteristic of European patent law as it stands today is that European patents granted by the European Patent Office (EPO), and patents granted by national patent offices are available, and may possibly –if permitted by national law and, if so, to the extent permitted by national law– co-exist within a given jurisdiction. Utility models, referred to as "Gebrauchsmuster" in Germany and Austria, are available in some countries.

Patent applications can be filed at the relevant national patent office or at the EPO. Alternatively, an international application may be filed under the Patent Cooperation Treaty (PCT) and later nationalised in the desired countries or at the EPO. However, Belgium, Cyprus, France, Greece, Ireland, Italy, Latvia, Malta, Monaco, the Netherlands, and Slovenia have "closed their national route" meaning that it is no longer possible to nationalise an international application in those countries directly and protection can only be obtained via the EPO.

=== European patents ===
A European patent is the product of a unified grant procedure before the EPO under procedures established by the European Patent Convention (EPC). Before grant, a European patent application is a unitary legal entity. However, after grant, a "European patent" essentially ceases to have unitary character.

Some of the 40 EPC contracting states require the patentee to file a full translation of the granted European patent with the national patent office of the state if the text of the European patent as granted is not in one of their official languages. If the translation is not filed, the European patent is deemed to have no effect from the outset in that state. The London Agreement, which entered into force on May 1, 2008, significantly reduces the number of required translations in the states that are party to it.

A central time-limited opposition procedure and central limitation and revocation procedures before the EPO are available however. The opposition procedure allows any person except for the patent proprietor to oppose a granted European patent in an attempt to have the EPO revoke or amend the patent. The opposition procedure may only be initiated within nine months of the grant of the European patent. The limitation and revocation procedures allow the patentee to centrally request the limitation or revocation of their own European patent.

After the unitary European examination and opposition phase ends, nearly all "unitary" nature of the European patent dissolves, and what remains is a bundle of essentially-independent national patents, and ownership, validity and infringement of each being determined independently under respective national law. Article 64(1) EPC provides that, in each member country, the national part of the European patent has the identical effect as a national patent with the identical claims would have.

However, any group of EPC Contracting States may agree that a European patent granted for those States has a unitary character throughout their territories, hence allowing the existence of European patents with unitary effect (a "unitary patent"), which each remain a single object of property with a single (group of) owners and a single prosecution system.Article 142 EPC Two such unitary patents exist:

- the European Union unitary patent which applies in 18 countries and which is litigated at the Unified Patent Court, and
- the unitary patent for Switzerland and Liechtenstein.

Furthermore, in 18 EU countries party to the Unified Patent Court Agreement (UPCA), a single body of "national" law is applied and a single court determines validity and infringement, resulting in decisions that apply for all those countries where the patent applies. During a transitional period however also national courts are competent to hear cases regarding those matters.

The European Patent Convention expressly adopts national law for all substantive attributes of a national part of a European patent, with the following exceptions:

- standards for revocation - national law is expressly preempted, and grounds for revoking a national part are limited to five grounds specified in Article 138(1) EPC (subject matter, enabling disclosure, and claims beyond the content of the application as filed, protection has been extended or improper proprietor) - though each state is free to interpret the five grounds of Art. 138 under its own national law
- infringement by the direct product of a patented process
- patent term, 20 years from the filing date

All other substantive attributes of each national part of an EP patent, such as what acts constitute infringement (indirect and divided infringement, infringement by equivalents, extraterritorial infringement, infringement outside the term of the patent with economic effect during the term of the patent, infringement of product claims by processes for making or using, exports, assembly of parts into an infringing whole, etc.), the effect of prosecution history on interpretation of the claims, what remedies are available for infringement or bad faith enforcement (injunction, damages, attorney fees, other civil penalties for willful infringement, etc.), equitable defenses, coexistence of an EP national part and a national patent for identical subject matter, ownership and assignment, extensions to patent term for regulatory approval, etc., are expressly remitted to national law.

=== Eurasian patents ===
Eurasian patents are granted under the Eurasian Patent Convention in a system which is similar to the European Patent Convention: after a unitary grant procedure the patent becomes a national patent in each of the 8 member states.

=== Unitary patents ===
Countries may create unitary protection with regards to patents, which means that the effect (including revocation) is equal in all countries concerned. Such unitary protection was effected (both for "national" and European patents) by Switzerland and Liechtenstein in 1980 with the Treaty between the Swiss Confederation and the Principality of Liechtenstein on Patent Protection of 1978.

=== National patents ===
National patents are available in all European countries, except the Holy See. In some European countries, national patents are substantively examined, while in other countries there is no provision for such examination and patents are thus granted if formal requirements are met, while novelty and inventive step is not evaluated. It can be cheaper and tactically advantageous to apply for a few national patents rather than for a European patent at the European Patent Office.

In the United Kingdom, for example, the Patents Act 1977 and the Patents Act 2004 establish the law relating to patents including filing, examination, grant, infringement, revocation, assignment. UK law is in many ways similar to the European Patent Convention (EPC) (although the EPC deals with very few post-grant activities). UK patents law also applies in the Isle of Man, while in certain dependent territories and crown dependencies, European patents can be registered. In Europe this is the case for Gibraltar (within 5 years of grant), Guernsey (at any time during the patent lifetime) and Jersey (within 3 years of grant).

National patents may be the only available patents in European states that are neither party to the European Patent Convention nor the Eurasian Patent Convention. This is the case for Andorra and Ukraine (which signed but did not ratify the Eurasian Patent Convention). Moldova (a former party to the Eurasian Patent Convention), Montenegro, and Bosnia and Herzegovina are extension states to the European Patent Convention, which means that European patents granted are deemed to take effect also in these states, if extension is correctly requested; and provided certain translation and publication requirements are met.

=== Utility models ===
In Europe, utility models are available in Austria (Gebrauchsmuster), France ("certificat d'utilité"), Germany ("Gebrauchsmuster"), Italy ("modello di utilità"), Finland ("hyödyllisyysmalli"), Denmark ("brugsmodel"), Russia ("Полезная модель") and Spain (this list is however non-exhaustive). The term of a utility model is usually shorter than the term of a patent and has less stringent patentability requirements.

== Differences and similarities between national laws ==
Substantive patent law has been harmonized to a certain extent across national laws in Europe, notably upon signature of the Strasbourg Convention of 1963 and the European Patent Convention (EPC) of 1973, and upon entry into force of the TRIPs Agreement. In practice however, the interpretation of common substantive provisions have led to different interpretations in different European countries.

Regarding procedural law, and especially regarding the procedures to examine infringement and validity of patents before national courts, significant differences exist across national laws. For instance, while in Germany validity and infringement of patents are examined by different courts in different procedures (in a so-called "bifurcation system"), in the United Kingdom the same court is in charge of examining validity and infringement actions. According to Mr Justice Kitchin, a British judge,

"... it is desirable to try infringement and validity issues together, where at all possible. If they are tried separately it is all too easy for the patentee to argue for a narrow interpretation of his claim when defending it but an expansive interpretation when asserting infringement."

In other words, the German bifurcation system is often regarded as favouring the patentee. In this respect, Lord Justice Jacob referred to a comparison reportedly made by Professor Mario Franzosi between a patentee and an Angora cat:

"When validity is challenged, the patentee says his patent is very small: the cat with its fur smoothed down, cuddly and sleepy. But when the patentee goes on the attack, the fur bristles, the cat is twice the size with teeth bared and eyes ablaze."

The German patent system is, however, "particularly appealing for a large number of users", notably because it is regarded as relatively quick and affordable. The bifurcation character of the Germany system "is considered as both a shortcoming in some respects, and as an advantage in others."

== Unitary patents in the European Union ==
The creation of a European community patent system, which would lead to a single unitary patent in the European Union (or its predecessor the European Community), were debated since the 1970s. In 2012 agreement was reached between all European Union Member States except Italy and Spain on a European patent with unitary effect, more commonly known as the unitary patent, a proposed new type of patent that would be valid in participating member states of the European Union. (Note: All EU member states except Italy and Spain, which abstained due to the exclusive use of English, French, and German languages, and Croatia, which subsequently acceded to the EU, joined the unitary patent regulation. States will only participate in the unitary patent if they ratify the UPC Agreement.) Unitary effect can be registered for a European patent upon grant, replacing validation of the European patent in the individual countries concerned. The unitary effect means a single renewal fee, a single (group of) owner(s), a single object of property, and uniform protection, which means that revocation as well as infringement proceedings are to be decided for the unitary patent as a whole rather than for each country individually. Licensing is however to remain possible for individual countries.

Agreement on the two EU regulations which make the unitary patent possible was reached during the European Council of 28–29 June 2012, and by the European Parliament on 11 December 2012. The provisions, i.e. the Unitary Patent Regulation and the Translation Regulation, apply since June 1, 2023, the date of entry into force of the related Agreement on a Unified Patent Court.

Other legal agreements have been proposed outside the European Union legal framework to reduce the cost of translation (of European patents when granted) and litigation, namely the London Agreement (which entered into force in 2008) and the European Patent Litigation Agreement (EPLA) (which never entered into force).

== Statistics ==
Based on data from Germany, France, the Netherlands, and the UK, the Centre for European Economic Research (ZEW) found that German courts handle by far the largest number of patent litigation cases.

== See also ==
- Enforcement of European patents
- European trade mark law
- European Union patent law
- Intellectual property in Romania
- Patent infringement under United Kingdom law
- Unitary patent (Switzerland and Liechtenstein)
