= Europe-wide patent =

Europe-wide patent may refer to:

- Unitary patent, a European Union project to create a unitary patent in most EU member states
- European patents, granted by the European Patent Office under the European Patent Convention and enforced by national courts

== See also ==
- European patent law
