= Forty-first Amendment of the Constitution (Agreement on a Unified Patent Court) Bill 2024 =

Proposed constitutional amendment in Ireland

Forty-first Amendment of the Constitution of Ireland
- Agreement on a Unified Patent Court

The Forty-first Amendment of the Constitution (Agreement on a Unified Patent Court) Bill 2024 (bill no. 7 of 2024) is a proposed amendment to the Constitution of Ireland to allow the state to ratify the Agreement on a Unified Patent Court.

The Agreement on the Unified Patent Court was signed in 2013 by Ireland and 25 EU member states. The Unified Patent Court started operations in 2023 for 17 EU members. The court settles disputes regarding European patents, including European patents with unitary effect. Entry into force of the agreement for Ireland would also mean that Ireland would be covered by the European patent with unitary effect: a single patent covering 17 EU countries.

Ireland plans to establish a local division of the court of first instance in Dublin.

For Ireland to ratify the agreement, an amendment to the Constitution of Ireland will be required, which must be approved in a bill by both houses of the Oireachtas and in a referendum. The government had stated an intention to hold the referendum on 7 June 2024, the same day as the European Parliament election and local elections. However, in April 2024, it was reported that the government was considering not holding the referendum on that date, considering the defeat of referendums on family and care in March 2024. The postponement was confirmed shortly after by Peter Burke, the Minister for Enterprise, Trade and Employment.

== Wording ==
The bill was presented by the Minister for Enterprise, Trade and Employment on 15 February 2024, and was passed by the Dáil on 6 March. It proposes to add the following subsection to Article 29.4:

11° The State may ratify the Agreement on a Unified Patent Court done at Brussels on the 19th day of February 2013. No provision of this Constitution invalidates laws enacted, acts done or measures adopted by the State that are necessitated by the obligations of the State under that Agreement or prevents laws enacted, acts done or measures adopted by bodies competent under that Agreement from having the force of law in the State.

== Campaign ==
The Electoral Commission would provide information explaining the proposed amendment and promoting voter participation.

The proposal has support from the Irish Business and Employers Confederation.

== See also ==
- 2014 Danish Unified Patent Court membership referendum
