= Unitary patent (Switzerland and Liechtenstein) =

1978 treaty between Switzerland and Liechtenstein

Patent Treaty of December 22, 1978
Treaty between the Swiss Confederation and the Principality of Liechtenstein on Patent Protection
- Signed: 22 December 1978
- Location: Vaduz
- Effective: 1 April 1980
- Expiration: Concluded for an unlimited period of time.
- Signatories: 2
- Parties: 2
- Language: German

The unitary patent for Switzerland and Liechtenstein is a patent having a unitary character over the territories of Switzerland and Liechtenstein. It can either be a national patent, or a European patent granted under the European Patent Convention (EPC) and having a unitary character pursuant to Article 142(1) EPC. The unitary patent "may only be granted, transferred, annulled or lapse in respect of the whole territory of protection," i.e. for both Switzerland and Liechtenstein.

The special agreement establishing this unitary patent is the Treaty between the Swiss Confederation and the Principality of Liechtenstein on Patent Protection of 22 December 1978, which entered into force on 1 April 1980. This special agreement is also a regional patent agreement within the meaning of Article 45 PCT. Amongst the bilateral treaties concluded between Switzerland and Liechtenstein in the field of patents, the Patent Treaty of 22 December 1978 is considered to be the most important one.

A European patent may only be granted jointly in respect of Switzerland and Liechtenstein, following a joint designation under Article 149 EPC. The unitary patent for Switzerland and Liechtenstein was the only unitary patent under Article 142(1) EPC in force until 2023, when the unitary patent (applicable in 17 EU member states) regulation entered into force.

== Background ==
Patents granted under the European Patent Convention (EPC) are called European patents. Those are granted following a unified grant procedure based on a single patent application, in one language. After grant however, a European patent is not a unitary right, but becomes a bundle of essentially independent nationally-enforceable, nationally-revocable patents –subject to central revocation or narrowing as a group pursuant to two types of unified, post-grant procedures: a time-limited opposition procedure, which can be initiated by any person except the patent proprietor, and limitation and revocation procedures, which can be initiated by the patent proprietor only.

Switzerland introduced a federal patent system a year after a referendum held in 1887 (before the subject was devoted to cantons, and in practice there was little protection). Until the entry into force of the Patent Treaty between Switzerland and Liechtenstein on 1 April 1980, Swiss patents could be also enforced in Liechtenstein, which at that time did not grant its own patents. This had been made possible by a regulation unilaterally enacted in 1924 by Liechtenstein, but considered only as a temporary measure. The legal situation was unsatisfactory. In the 1970s, when both the Patent Cooperation Treaty (PCT) and the European Patent Convention (EPC) were signed and came into effect, to which Liechtenstein wished to participate, Liechtenstein had to either enact its own patent law or sign a regional patent treaty with Switzerland. Liechtenstein chose the latter possibility.

== Joint designation and unitary character ==
A European patent may only be granted jointly in respect of Switzerland and Liechtenstein, following a joint designation under Article 149 EPC. Upon filing a European patent application, an applicant cannot choose to designate Switzerland without designating Liechtenstein, or Liechtenstein without designating Switzerland. The designation of one of the two countries is deemed to be a designation of both. This also meant, for European patent applications filed before 1 April 2009 (before the introduction of an all-inclusive designation fee payable for all EPC contracting states), that a single joint designation fee was payable for Switzerland and Liechtenstein.

After grant, the European patent in force in Switzerland and Liechtenstein—in the same manner as a "national" patent in Switzerland and Liechtenstein— has a truly unitary character. It can only be transferred, revoked or lapse for both states at the same time. It has also the same effect in both countries. The Swiss Federal Institute of Intellectual Property is the only competent national authority regarding the unitary patent for Switzerland and Liechtenstein.

An international application under the Patent Cooperation Treaty (PCT) can also only jointly designate Switzerland and Liechtenstein under Article 4 PCT. Based on an international application, it is possible to obtain a unitary patent in Switzerland and Liechtenstein by entering either into the European regional phase (therefore leading to a Euro-PCT application, which is essentially the same as a direct European patent application) or into the national phase.

== Grant procedures ==
The unitary patent in Switzerland and Liechtenstein can either be a European patent granted under the European Patent Convention (EPC), or a national patent. The procedure leading to the grant of a European patent and the procedure leading to the grant of a "national" patent in Switzerland and Liechtenstein are, however, different.

The European Patent Office (EPO) is in charge of granting European patents. The grant procedure before the EPO is administrative procedure, which notably involves a substantive examination of the European patent application, in accordance with the legal provisions of the European Patent Convention (EPC).

In contrast, the grant procedure for "national" patents in Switzerland and Liechtenstein takes place before the Swiss Federal Institute of Intellectual Property and does not involve a substantial examination. No examination takes place as to whether the claimed invention is new and inventive. The patent is granted provided that certain formal requirements are fulfilled. It is possible to obtain a search report during the procedure, but this is optional and has no effect on the decision to grant.

=== Languages ===
While the language of the proceedings at the European Patent Office may only be English, French or German, the proceedings before the Swiss Federal Institute of Intellectual Property, for the grant of a "national" patent, are conducted in German, French or Italian. As Switzerland and Liechtenstein are parties to the London Agreement, no translation is required for a European patent to remain effective after grant in these two countries.

== Jurisdiction ==
In Switzerland, the Federal Patent Court has exclusive jurisdiction over validity and infringement disputes, preliminary measures and enforcement of decisions made under its exclusive jurisdiction. The patent court started its work in 2012, taking over jurisdiction from 26 individual cantonal courts and consists of panels of both legally and technically qualified judges. In Liechtenstein, the Princely High Court (German: fürstliche Obergericht) was designated as court of single instance in civil cases regarding patents. Appeal is possible (with regard to legal issues) to the Federal Supreme Court, both for Swiss and Liechtenstein court actions.

== See also ==
- Liechtenstein–Switzerland relations
