= Unified Patent Court =

Patent court in the European Union

- Logo of the UPC
- Formation: Established by treaty
- Type: Intergovernmental organization, supranational court of several EU member states
- Legal status: Established on 19 January 2022 (provisional application); 1 June 2023 (formal start)
- Headquarters: Paris (court of first instance, central division); Luxembourg (court of appeal and registry)
- Region served: 18 EU member states
- Official languages: Danish, Dutch, English, Finnish, French, German, Italian, Portuguese, Slovenian, Swedish
- Presidium Chair: Klaus Grabinski
- Administrative Committee Chair: Johannes Karcher
- Registrar: Alexander Ramsay
- Website: www.unifiedpatentcourt.org

The Unified Patent Court (UPC) is a common supranational patent court of 18 member states of the European Union, which opened on 1 June 2023. It hears cases regarding infringement and revocation proceedings of European patents (regular European patents unless they were opted out and unitary patents). A single court ruling is directly applicable in the member states that have ratified the UPC Agreement (UPCA).

The UPCA is the legal basis for the court. It was signed as an intergovernmental treaty in February 2013 by 25 states, all then-EU member states except Spain, Poland and Croatia. The UPC entered into force after meeting three predefined conditions on 1 June 2023. Provisional application of the UPC Agreement was triggered on 19 January 2022 to enable preparation for the proper functioning of the court after entry into force. While the United Kingdom originally ratified the agreement, it withdrew from the UPC in 2020, following Brexit.

The UPC comprises a Court of First Instance, a Court of Appeal in Luxembourg, an Arbitration and Mediation Center and a common Registry. The Court of First Instance consists of a central division in Paris (with thematic sections in Munich and, since 1 July 2024, Milan), along with 13 local and one regional divisions. Before the central division, the language of procedure is English, French or German, while English in combination with a local language is the language of procedure before the local divisions.

Since the entry into force of the UPCA, it is also possible to request unitary effect for a European patent, which then applies in all countries where the UPCA was in force upon grant of the European patent. Appeal against decisions of the European Patent Office (EPO) regarding the grant of unitary effect is also possible at the UPC.

== Background ==
European patents are granted by the European Patent Office under the 1973 European Patent Convention (EPC). As of October 2022, 39 countries, including all countries of the European Union, are parties to the EPC. After grant, a European patent essentially (Note: Opposition, limitation and revocation proceedings are still available centrally after a patent's grant.) becomes "a bundle of national patents" (subject, in some countries, (Note: See also London Agreement (2000).) to translation requirements in an official language of that country) in all countries separately, after which renewal fees are also due in all countries where the patent applies. Infringement proceedings in one country have essentially no effect in others, which sometimes leads to parallel litigation regarding the same European patent in different countries, with the possibility of having different outcomes out of these national court proceedings. This fragmented situation has been seen as an impediment to the establishment of an internal market within the European Union.

To reduce translation and litigation costs, the European Union has passed legislation regarding European patents with unitary effect. The European Parliament approved the proposed regulation on 11 December 2012 and they entered into force in January 2013. As Spain and Italy objected to the translation requirements, which featured only the three European Patent Convention languages of English, German and French, they did not originally participate in the regulation, which were thus organized as an enhanced cooperation mechanism between member states, but Italy subsequently joined. Registration of unitary effect is to be organised by the European Patent Office and requires less translations and a single renewal fee for the whole territory. The unitary patent coexists with "regular" European patents.

Unitary patent protection, however, also requires a uniform patent court litigation system. That is provided for with the Unified Patent Court, which is constituted with the Agreement on a Unified Patent Court, signed on 19 February 2013 and which can handle cases related to European patents with and without unitary effect. The Agreement also incorporates many of the provisions of the proposed European Patent Litigation Agreement. The unitary patent provisions apply since the Agreement on a Unified Patent Court entered into force on 1 June 2023.

== Locations ==
Locations of the Court of First Instance (Central division, "Court"), the Court of Appeal and the Patent Mediation and Arbitration Centre. In addition, several local and regional divisions of the Court of First Instance exist.

=== Court of First Instance ===
The Court of First Instance has a central division with its seat in Paris, and thematic sections in Munich (mechanical engineering cases) and Milan. The distribution of cases within the central division is set out in Annex II of the UPCA, which forms an integral part of the Agreement. While formally scheduled to hold a thematic section focusing on chemistry cases, including pharmaceuticals, London does not host a section following Brexit with the other branches of the central division temporarily taking over those cases. A change to the UPC Agreement entered into force on 1 July 2024 to accommodate the replacement of London with Milan as thematic section, while moving part of the expected case load to Munich and Paris.

Next to the central division, contracting states are free to set up local or regional divisions up to a maximum number depending on case load. The characteristics of the divisions and their territorial jurisdiction is shown below:

Type	State(s) concerned	Location	Language(s)	Number of local judges
Central	All	Paris	English, French, German	
Central (Section)	All	Milan	English, French, German	
Central (Section)	All	Munich	English, French, German	
Regional	Estonia, Latvia, Lithuania, Sweden (Nordic-Baltic division)	Stockholm (mainly)	English	2
Local	Austria	Vienna	German and English	1
Local	Belgium	Brussels	Dutch, English^{#}, French, German	1
Local	Denmark	Copenhagen	Danish, English	1
Local	France	Paris	French, English^{#}	2
Local	Finland	Helsinki	English, Finnish, Swedish	1
Local	Germany	Düsseldorf	German, English^{#}	4
Local	Germany	Hamburg	German, English^{#}	2
Local	Germany	Mannheim	German, English^{#}	3
Local	Germany	Munich	German, English^{#}	5
Local	Italy	Milan	Italian, English^{#}	2
Local	Netherlands	The Hague	Dutch and English	3
Local	Portugal	Lisbon	Portuguese and English	1
Local	Slovenia	Ljubljana	Slovenian and English	1

^{#}Judge-rapporteur may decide to use a national language for oral proceedings and/or the decision

Locations of Local (green pog) and Regional (orange pog) divisions of the Court of First Instance.
Country with one local division
Country with four local divisions
Country included in Nordic-Baltic regional division
Country not included in local/regional division

Local division
Regional division (seat)

Regional division (place of hearing)

Of the countries that ratified, Bulgaria, Luxembourg, Malta and Romania are not part of a local or regional division, and actions that could normally be brought before the local division of those countries, can be brought before the Central division.

=== Court of Appeal ===
The court of Appeal is located in Luxembourg and also serves as the registry.

=== Other activities ===
Training of judges takes place in Budapest, and Lisbon and Ljubljana host the seats of a patent mediation and arbitration centre. The training centre for judges and candidate judges was officially opened on 13 March 2014 in Budapest.

== Operation ==
=== Composition of panels of judges ===
The system includes both legally qualified and technically qualified judges, who would sit in panels of three (Court of First Instance) or five (Court of Appeal) judges. Local divisions may ask (on their own or on the request of one of the parties) to have an extra technically-qualified judge added.

An overview of the composition of the panels of judges is as follows:

Division type	Court	number of judges	Nationals of the division	Legally qualified judges	Technically qualified judges
Central	First Instance	3		2^{A} (3)^{A, B}	1 (0)^{B}
Local (<50 cases/year)	First Instance	3 (4)^{C}	1	3	0 (1)^{C}
Local (>50 cases/year)	First Instance	3 (4)^{C}	2	3	0 (1)^{C}
Regional	First Instance	3 (4)^{C}	2	3	0 (1)^{C}
Court of Appeal	Appeal	5 (3)^{B}		3^{A}	2 (0)^{B}

^{A} Of different nationalities
^{B} When dealing with actions under Article 32(1)(i) UPCA (actions concerning decisions of the EPO regarding the administration of the unitary patents),
or when the appeal is of a non-technical nature and no technical issues are at stake. ^{C} Upon request of one of the parties (or the panel)

=== Proceedings before the Court ===
The proceedings before the Court comprise three consecutive parts: a written procedure, an interim procedure, and an oral procedure.

=== Appeal procedure ===
Appeals against decisions of the Court of First Instance may be brought before the Court of Appeal "within two months of the date of the notification of the decision". In addition, appeals against certain orders (such as an order to produce evidence) issued by the Court of First Instance may also be brought before the Court of Appeal but within a shorter term, i.e. "15 calendar days of the notification of the order to the applicant". Appeals may be brought on both points of law and questions of facts.

The Court of Appeal may refer cases of exceptional importance to the full Court (i.e., the Court of Appeal sitting as a full Court), in order to ensure "unity and consistency of the case law of the Court".

=== Language of the proceedings ===
Proceedings before a local or regional division generally take place in the local language of the local or regional division, in an official language of the EPO (English, German or French) if the local or regional division has designated such a language, or in the language in which the patent was granted (English, German or French) if the parties and the panel all agree. Before the central division, proceedings take place in the language in which the patent was granted (English, German or French). The proceedings before the Court of Appeal generally proceed in the language used before the Court of First Instance, or in the language in which the patent was granted (English, German or French) if the parties all agree.

=== Court fees ===
To finance its budget, the UPC's own financial revenues notably comprise court fees, which the UPC's Administrative Committee adopts and periodically reviews. Some of the court fees are fixed fees, whereas others are constituted of a combination of a fixed fee and an additional value-based fee, i.e. a fee depending on the value of the action, which also referred to as the "value of the proceedings" or "value in dispute".

=== Recoverable costs ===
The UPCA provides for that the unsuccessful party in UPC proceedings, i.e. the losing party, shall bear "[r]easonable and proportionate legal costs and other expenses incurred by the successful party", i.e. the winning party. The recoverable costs are capped, and the applicable ceilings depend on the value of the action.

== Governance ==
Three committees have been established "to ensure the effective implementation and operation" of the Agreement:

- An Administrative Committee, composed of one representative of each Contracting Member State

Established upon provisional application, it held its inaugural meeting in February 2022. It is headed by Johannes Karcher (ad interim).

- A Budget Committee, also composed of one representative of each Contracting Member State
- An Advisory Committee, comprising "patent judges and practitioners in patent law and patent litigation with the highest recognised competence", amongst others tasked with the advising on selection of judges. Willem Hoyng is its Chairman.

A preparatory committee was established enabling entry into force when the required number of ratifications is reached. The committee held its first meeting in March 2013 and was initially headed by Paul van Beukering and later by Alexander Ramsay.

== Judges ==
The list of appointed UPC judges was published on 19 October 2022 and contains 34 legally qualified judges and 51 technically qualified judges. Klaus Grabinski (Germany) is president of the Court of Appeal, while Florence Butin (France) is president of the Court of First Instance.

== Case load ==
Since the UPC began operating in June 2023, 883 cases have been filed as of 31 May 2025. Of these, 320 are infringement actions, 304 are counterclaims for revocation, and 65 are stand-alone revocation actions. 88 applications for provisional measures were filed in the first instance.

== Sources of law and applicable law ==
Article 24 of the Agreement specifies the sources of law that the Court shall base its decisions on:

- European Union law, including the two EU regulations on the unitary patent
- The Agreement on a Unified Patent Court
- The European Patent Convention
- Other international agreements applicable to patents and binding on all member states
- National law

For the evaluation of which national law applies, regulations governing private international law (of which the Rome I and Rome II regulations form the cornerstone) that are part of EU law as well as multilateral agreements are leading.

The court is a court of the EU member states, and such not a European Union institution. It is however a court within the European Union. As for other courts in the European Union, the UPC may request, or in the case of the UPC Court of Appeal must request, the Court of Justice of the European Union (CJEU) to give a preliminary ruling on matters relating to European Union law, and the decisions of the CJEU are then binding on the UPC.

== Substantive law on patent infringement ==
Art. 25 UPCA defines what constitutes a direct infringement of a patent under the Agreement, and Art. 26 defines what constitutes an indirect infringement thereof.

The Agreement also establishes several bases for the use of patented information without permission of the patent holder. Those bases are applicable to European patents, both with and without unitary effect. The exceptions, given in Article 27, include the following:

- private and non-commercial use
- breeding of patented material
- use on airplanes and ships of third states while temporarily in the territory of a participating member state
- decompiling software covered by patented information

Art. 28 UPCA further provides that prior use rights (and rights derived from a prior personal possession of the patented invention) governed under the national law of a Contracting Member State may be invoked as a defense against an alleged patent infringement before the UPC but only for the Contracting Member State(s) concerned by the prior use.

== Competence ==
The Unified Patent Court (UPC) has competence to hear actions regarding European patents with unitary effect and other European patents in force where normally a national court of the countries for which the agreement is applicable. In the case of European patents without unitary effect, during a seven-year transitional period (which the Administrative Council may prolong by up to seven years), actions may also be brought before national courts, and proprietors of patents may opt out from the exclusive competence of the UPC. (Note: Once opted out, a European patent without unitary effect remains outside the jurisdiction of the UPC for the lifetime of the patent unless the opt-out is later withdrawn.) Decisions of the UPC generally cover the full territory of the UPCA Contracting Member States in which the European patent has effect, but may (e.g. in actions regarding infringement) also have effect in other states where the European patent has effect. The UPC also held that it is competent for acts of patent infringement that occurred before the entry into force of the UPCA and during the period when the European patent under dispute had been opted out if eventually the opt-out has been withdrawn.

Actions may concern inter alia patent infringement (actual patent infringement or threat of patent infringement), declarations of non-infringement, provisional and protective measures and injunctions (including preliminary injunctions), revocation (i.e., standalone revocation actions), counterclaims for revocation (by the defendant in an infringement action), and establishments of damages. The UPC competence also covers supplementary protection certificates (SPC) issued for a product protected by a European patent with or without unitary effect.

The existing competences of the European Patent Office (EPO) remain unchanged. An opposition procedure dealing with the validity of the patent but not with infringement may still be brought before the EPO during a nine-month period after the grant of the patent. Decisions by the EPO are valid throughout the territory in which the European patent is valid, which may thus encompass 39 countries. Furthermore, countries may still grant their own national patents, independently of the EPO. Such patents are not litigated in the Unified Patent Court.

== Legal basis: The Agreement on a Unified Patent Court ==
Agreement on a Unified Patent Court
- Parties to the Agreement on a Unified Patent Court Court and unitary patent applies Signatories of the Agreement on a Unified Patent Court court and unitary patent participation after ratification Others unitary patent participants (eligible for UPC participation) other EU member states (eligible for UPC participation) other EPC parties (no UPC participation possible)
- Type: Intergovernmental agreement
- Signed: 19 February 2013
- Location: Brussels, Belgium
- Effective: 1 June 2023
- Condition: Amendment of the Brussels I Regulation, ratification by the three largest patent-granting EU member states in 2012 (France, Germany, Italy) and ratification by at least 13 states in total
- Provisional application: 19 January 2022
- Signatories: 25 EU member states (all except Croatia, Poland and Spain)
- Parties: 18
- Depositary: General Secretariat of the Council of the European Union
- Languages: English, German and French

Full text
- Agreement on a Unified Patent Court at Wikisource

The Agreement on a Unified Patent Court establishes the court as a court of the member states. As a court established by treaty participating in the interoperation of European Union law, it bears similarities to the Benelux Court of Justice. An initial proposal, which shared many similarities with the proposed European Patent Litigation Agreement and included non-EU countries, was found to be incompatible with EU law by the Court of Justice of the European Union, as it would lead to a court not falling fully within the legal system of the European Union, thus being without the possibility to ask prejudicial questions to the EU court of justice. As a result, the court was established by an intergovernmental treaty between the participating states outside the framework of the EU but open only to members of the EU.

=== Signatures ===
The agreement was signed on 19 February 2013 in Brussels by 24 states, including all states participating in the enhanced cooperation measures except Bulgaria and Poland, while Italy, which did not join the enhanced cooperation measures, did sign the UPC agreement. It is open to any member state of the European Union (whether they participated in the unitary patent or not), but it is not to other parties to the European Patent Convention. Bulgaria signed the agreement on 5 March after it had finalised its internal procedures. Meanwhile, Poland decided to wait to see how the new patent system works before joining because of concerns that it would harm its economy. While Italy did not originally participate in the unitary patent regulations, it formally joined them in September 2015. Regardless of the outcome of that process, becoming a party to the UPC agreement will allow the court to handle European patents in force in the country. Spain and Croatia (the latter would accede to the EU in July 2013) are the only EU member states not participating in either the UPC or the unitary patent, but both countries may accede to the unitary patent system at any time.

=== Entry into force ===
The agreement entered into force for the first group of 17 ratifiers on 1 June 2023, the first day of the fourth month after all of these three conditions were met: Romania became the 18th member on 1 September 2024, following its ratification in May 2024.

Conditions for entry into force	Status	Date satisfied
Brussels I Regulation amendment entry into force	In force	30 May 2014
Ratification by three EU states with most European patents in effect in 2012 (France, Germany and Italy (previously UK))	3	17 February 2023
Ratification or accession by at least thirteen states	17	1 August 2017

The entry into force was triggered when Germany deposited its instrument of ratification on 17 February 2023, leading to the scheduled entry into force on 1 June 2023.

For signatories ratifying or acceding after the entry into force of the agreement, their membership takes effect on the first day of the fourth month after the member state deposits its instrument of ratification or accession.

==== Activities before entry into force ====
For operations of the Unified Patent Court to commence, the agreement shall have entered into force, and practical arrangements have to be made. To that end, five working groups of the Preparatory Committee have been established to conduct the preparatory work. Preselection of candidate UPC judges took place in 2014, with the first training activities taking place in 2015.

Rules regarding representation before the court were provisionally approved in September 2015. They include the requirements for the European Patent Litigation Certificate (for which academic courses will be accredited) as well as equivalent certificates that are accepted during a transition period. Patent attorneys with a law degree are exempted from the EPLC.

===== Provisional application =====
Discussions on a Protocol to the Agreement on a Unified Patent Court on Provisional Application were closed in September 2015. The protocol was signed by eight states on 7 October 2015: Denmark, Germany, Hungary, France, Luxembourg, Slovenia, Sweden and the United Kingdom. Provisional application allows the hiring of judges and moving to the court premises. Provisional application started on 19 January 2022 after 13 states (including Germany, France and the United Kingdom) ratified the Unified Patent Court Agreement or indicated to have finished their parliamentary process.

===== Adoption of formal rules =====
In its inaugural meeting in February 2022, the Administrative Committee approved the Rules on the European Patent Litigation Certificate and other appropriate qualifications, UPC Service and Staff Regulations and Financial Regulations.

===== Select committee =====
Beside the completion of the work of the Preparatory Committee, the EPO Select Committee performs preparatory work for implementation of the unitary patent, to be "completed in due time before the entry into operation of the UPC", as unitary patent regulations apply from the date that the UPC agreement enters into force. As of June 2015, the Select Committee expected to complete its work in Autumn 2015.

=== Ratification ===
In October 2013, European Council President Herman Van Rompuy stated that the "dream of a single patent still isn't fully fulfilled", and he "urged the EU's member states to ratify the agreement". A list of signatory countries and ratifiers is shown below. The agreement entered into force for the first 17 ratifiers on 1 June 2023. On 1 September 2024, Romania became the first country to become a party to the UPC after its entry into force.

Signatory	Signature	Institution	Conclusion date	Majority needed	In favour	Against	AB	Deposited	Ref.
Austria	19 February 2013	Federal Council	18 July 2013	50%	Majority approval			6 August 2013	
Austria	19 February 2013	National Council	6 July 2013	50%	Majority approval (Note: SPÖ, ÖVP, FPÖ and Team Stronach voted for and Grüne and BZÖ voted against the Unified Patent Court law.)			6 August 2013	
Austria	19 February 2013	Presidential Assent		-				6 August 2013	
Belgium	19 February 2013	Senate	13 March 2014	50%	46	8	0	6 June 2014	
Belgium	19 February 2013	Chamber of Representatives	23 April 2014	50%	107	19	0	6 June 2014	
Belgium	19 February 2013	Royal Assent	27 May 2014	-	Granted			6 June 2014	
Bulgaria	5 March 2013 (Note: The date reported by the agreements database of the depositary is 19 February 2013, while news reports and a dedicated EU patent ratification page of the depositary reports 5 March 2013.)	National Assembly	8 April 2016	50%	Approved			3 June 2016	
Bulgaria	5 March 2013	Presidential Assent	18 April 2016	-	Granted			3 June 2016	
Cyprus	19 February 2013	House of Representatives							
Cyprus	19 February 2013	Presidential Assent		-					
Czech Republic	19 February 2013	Chamber of Deputies							
Czech Republic	19 February 2013	Senate							
Czech Republic	19 February 2013	Presidential Assent		-					
Denmark	19 February 2013	Folketing	29 April 2014	50% (Note: In combination with a successful referendum, a 50% majority is required in the Folketing. If no referendum is held, a 5/6 majority of the Folketing is required.)	90	21	0	20 June 2014	
Denmark	19 February 2013	Referendum	25 May 2014	50%	62.5%	37.5%	-	20 June 2014	
Denmark	19 February 2013	Royal Assent	2 June 2014	-	Granted			20 June 2014	
Estonia	19 February 2013	Riigikogu	4 June 2017	50%	86	0	1	1 August 2017	
Estonia	19 February 2013	Presidential Assent	14 June 2017	-	Granted			1 August 2017	
Finland	19 February 2013	Parliament	8 December 2015		Approved			19 January 2016	
Finland	19 February 2013	Presidential Assent	8 January 2016	-	Granted			19 January 2016	
France (Note: Ratification required for entry into force.)	19 February 2013	National Assembly	13 February 2014	50%	Approved			14 March 2014	
France	19 February 2013	Senate	21 November 2013	50%	Majority approval			14 March 2014	
France	19 February 2013	Presidential Assent	24 February 2014	-	Granted			14 March 2014	
Germany	19 February 2013	Bundestag	10 March 2017		~~Approved~~			17 February 2023	
Germany	19 February 2013	Bundesrat	31 March 2017		~~Approved~~			17 February 2023	
Germany	19 February 2013	Federal Constitutional Court	13 February 2020		Bundestag approval voided			17 February 2023	
Germany	19 February 2013	Bundestag	26 November 2020	66.6%	571	73		17 February 2023	
Germany	19 February 2013	Bundesrat	18 December 2020	66.6%	Unanimously			17 February 2023	
Germany	19 February 2013	Federal Constitutional Court	23 June 2021		Complaints held inadmissible			17 February 2023	
Germany	19 February 2013	Presidential Assent	12 August 2021	-	Granted			17 February 2023	
Greece	19 February 2013	Parliament							
Greece	19 February 2013	Presidential Promulgation		-					
Hungary	19 February 2013	National Assembly							
Hungary	19 February 2013	Presidential Assent		-					
Ireland	19 February 2013	Dáil Éireann	6 March 2024	50%	Passed				
Ireland	19 February 2013	Seanad Éireann		50%					
Ireland	19 February 2013	Referendum		50%					
Ireland	19 February 2013	Presidential Assent		-					
Italy	19 February 2013	Chamber of Deputies	14 September 2016		302	108	25	10 February 2017	
Italy	19 February 2013	Senate	18 October 2016		161	30	7	10 February 2017	
Italy	19 February 2013	Presidential Assent	3 November 2016	-	Granted			10 February 2017	
Latvia	19 February 2013	Parliament	30 March 2017		Approved			11 January 2018	
Latvia	19 February 2013	Presidential Assent	12 April 2017		Granted			11 January 2018	
Lithuania	19 February 2013	Parliament	3 November 2016		Approved			24 August 2017	
Lithuania	19 February 2013	Presidential Assent	8 November 2016	-	Granted			24 August 2017	
Luxembourg	19 February 2013	Chamber of Deputies	18 March 2015		58	0	0	22 May 2015	
Luxembourg	19 February 2013	Grand Ducal Assent	12 April 2015	-	Granted			22 May 2015	
Malta	19 February 2013	House of Representatives	21 January 2014	50%	Unanimous			9 December 2014	
Netherlands	19 February 2013	Senate	28 June 2016		Approved			14 September 2016	
Netherlands	19 February 2013	House of Representatives	17 June 2016		Approved			14 September 2016	
Netherlands	19 February 2013	Royal Promulgation	29 June 2016	-	Granted			14 September 2016	
Portugal	19 February 2013	Assembly	10 April 2015		Approved			28 August 2015	
Portugal	19 February 2013	Presidential Assent	6 August 2015	-	Granted			28 August 2015	
Romania	19 February 2013	House of Representatives	7 February 2024		248	0	0	31 May 2024	
Romania	19 February 2013	Senate	11 March 2024		Approved			31 May 2024	
Romania	19 February 2013	Presidential Assent	9 April 2024	-	Granted			31 May 2024	
Slovakia	19 February 2013	National Council							
Slovakia	19 February 2013	Presidential Assent		-					
Slovenia	19 February 2013	National Assembly	22 September 2016		48	11		15 October 2021	
Slovenia	19 February 2013	Presidential Assent	30 September 2016	-	Granted			15 October 2021	
Sweden	19 February 2013	Riksdagen	27 May 2014		by acclamation			5 June 2014	
United Kingdom	19 February 2013	House of Commons (IPA 2014)	12 March 2014 (Note: These instruments serve for the implementation of the UPC agreement, but do not constitute approval acts of the Agreement, as such acts are formally not required in the UK. See #Ratification notes for details regarding the ratification procedure)	50%	Approved			~~26 April 2018~~	
United Kingdom	19 February 2013	House of Lords (IPA 2014)	30 July 2013	50%	Approved			~~26 April 2018~~	
United Kingdom	19 February 2013	Royal Assent (IPA 2014)	14 May 2014	-	Granted			~~26 April 2018~~	
United Kingdom	19 February 2013	House of Commons (Patents Order 2016)	2 March 2016	50%	Approved			~~26 April 2018~~	
United Kingdom	19 February 2013	House of Lords (Patents Order 2016)	10 March 2016	50%	Approved			~~26 April 2018~~	
United Kingdom	19 February 2013	Royal Assent (Patents Order 2016)	12 March 2016	-	Granted			~~26 April 2018~~	
United Kingdom	19 February 2013	Denunciation		-				20 July 2020	

= States which have ratified the agreement
= States which must ratify the agreement for it to enter into force

==== Ratification notes ====
Denmark

The Ministry of Justice in Denmark issued its opinion in May 2013 that a referendum, or five-sixths majority in the Folketing was necessary for Denmark to ratify the agreement because of its constitutional requirements on the transfer of sovereignty. The Danish People's Party and Red-Green Alliance, which controlled enough seats in the Folketing (22 and 12 respectively, or a little more than one sixth of the 179 seats) to block ratification without referendum, stated that a referendum should be held. The People's Party said that it would support the UPC if the governing parties promise to hold a referendum on the proposed EU Banking Union or to increase restrictions on the distribution of welfare benefits to foreign nationals in Denmark. After a parliamentary agreement could not be reached, a UPC referendum was held, together with the EP election, on 25 May 2014. The Danish constitution states that the referendum defaults to a yes result unless at least 30% of all eligible to vote and more than 50% if the votes cast vote no. The referendum resulted in 62.5% yes votes, leading to the approval of the ratification act, with a deposit of the instrument of ratification on 20 June 2014.

Germany

In June 2017, Ingve Stjerna, a German lawyer, submitted a constitutional complaint against the German Unified Patent Court Agreement Act. Upon receiving the complaint, the Federal Constitutional Court asked German President Frank-Walter Steinmeier not to sign the law. Steinmeier complied and the ratification was then suspended. The complaint alleged a violation of the right to democracy, "democratic deficits and deficits in rule of law with regard to the regulatory powers of the organs of the UPC", "perceived lack of an independent judiciary under the UPC" and nonconformance of the UPC with EU law. It was believed that the last ground of the complaint, the alleged incompatibility of the UPC Agreement with EU law, might lead the Federal Constitutional Court to refer one or more questions to the Court of Justice of the European Union (CJEU), "which would mean a further delay of at least 15-24 months". Stjerna refrained from publicly commenting on the substance of the complaint. He nevertheless indicated to the JUVE magazine that "he has received neither the support of third parties nor financial backing". The complaint was upheld on 20 March 2020 with regards to the unconstitutionality of the parliamentary procedure approving the agreement in the Bundestag. The German government introduced a new bill to ratify the agreement, with the required two-thirds majority, to Parliament in June 2020.

In December 2020, after the new bill had been approved by both the Bundestag and the Bundesrat, two new constitutional complaints were filed against the new bill. These complaints led the Federal Constitutional Court to ask the German President not to sign the law. However, they were ruled inadmissible by the court in July 2021.

Hungary

Following a request for interpretation by the government the Constitutional Court of Hungary ruled that the UPC was incompatible with the Constitution of Hungary, and as such it would require amending to ratify.

Ireland

Ratification in Ireland would require a constitutional amendment, approved by referendum. A referendum was initially scheduled for the autumn of 2013, but it was subsequently postponed to an unscheduled date after the 2014 European Parliament election. Richard Bruton, the Minister for Jobs, Enterprise and Innovation confirmed in May 2014 that a constitutional referendum would be held but that the timing had not been decided by the government. The Irish government later revealed in its legislation programme that it has planned to publish the required "Amendment of the Constitution" bill in 2015 to amend Article 29 of the Constitution to recognise the Agreement on a Unified Patent Court, and after parliamentary approval will be put to a referendum. In May 2015, James Reilly, the Minister for Children and Youth Affairs stated that his government did not plan to hold any referendums during the remainder of its legislative term and so the Irish referendum and the ratification of the UPC would be postponed to after April 2016.

In January 2024, Simon Coveney, the Minister for Enterprise, Trade and Employment, published a general scheme for a constitutional amendment, with the government proposing a referendum to be held in June 2024, to coincide with the 2024 European Parliament election. The Forty-first Amendment of the Constitution (Agreement on a Unified Patent Court) Bill 2024 was published on 15 February 2024. In April 2024 the government announced that the referendum was postponed, and would not take place in June.

Netherlands

In the Netherlands, European patents apply to the whole Kingdom, except for Aruba. The ratification by the Netherlands in 2016 however only applied to the European part of the Kingdom. On the request of Curaçao and Sint Maarten, and after a positive advice by the European Commission, the application was extended to Curaçao and Sint Maarten as well as Bonaire, Sint Eustatius and Saba.

United Kingdom

In the United Kingdom, there is no requirement for a formal law approving of treaties before their ratification, but the Ponsonby Rule is that they are laid before Parliament with an explanatory memorandum, which the government did for the UPC Agreement on 23 June 2013. The Intellectual Property Act 2014 was approved by Parliament and entered into force on 14 May 2014. Section 17 empowers the Secretary of State to make provision by order for giving effect in the United Kingdom to jurisdiction for the Unified Patent Court if a draft of the order has been approved by Parliament. That means that ratification of the UPC agreement will not take place before Parliament's approval of the related implementation orders. The first order, the Patents (European Patent with Unitary Effect and Unified Patent Court) Order 2015, was submitted by the government on 10 June 2014 for a technical review with a 2 September 2014 deadline for replies. The government presented the results of its technical review consultation in March 2015, and on its basis, it began the process to complete the final version of its draft order to Parliament. In June 2015, the UK Intellectual Property Office stated, "It is the Government's intention for our domestic preparations [for ratification of the UPC] to be completed by Spring 2016". The Government laid the domestic implementing order before Parliament 21 January 2016. A second Statutory Instrument is needed to endorse the UPC Protocol on Privileges and Immunities, which the UK signed on 14 December 2016. The second Statutory Instrument will need to be finalised and laid before the Westminster and Scottish Parliaments, which will subject the Statutory Instrument to an affirmative procedure in order to complete the ratification of the UPC.

The UK government announced on 27 February 2020 that "the UK will not be seeking involvement in the UP/UPC system. Participating in a court that applies EU law and [that is] bound by the CJEU is inconsistent with our aims of becoming an independent self-governing nation."

On 20 July 2020 the UK formally withdrew its ratification of the treaty.

=== Amendment of the Brussels I regulation ===
A proposal for amendments of the Brussels I regulation was presented by the European Commission on 26 July 2013, and it needed to be approved by the Council of the European Union and the European Parliament. In a 523–98 vote, the European Parliament approved an amended version of the amendment on 15 April 2014. The same amendment was adopted by the Council of the European Union in an Ecofin Council meeting on 6 May 2014, and it formally entered into force on 30 May 2014 as Regulation 542/2014. Regulation 542/2014 amends the recast Brussels I Regulation 1215/2012, which is applicable from January 2015, and asserts that the Unified Patent Court has jurisdiction within the European Union if a contracting state to the Agreement would have jurisdiction in a matter that is regulated by the Agreement. It also renders the jurisdiction rules applicable in cases between parties in one EU country and parties in a non-EU country, a situation in which national law, rather than EU law, normally applies.

== Legal challenges ==
Spain and Italy both filed individual actions for annulment of the unitary patent regulation with the European Court of Justice (CJEU cases C-274/11 and C-295/11) in May 2011, arguing the use of enhanced cooperation was improper and the introduced trilingual (English, French, German) language regime system for the unitary patent, which they viewed as discriminatory to other EU languages, would be non-compliant with the EU treaties because of distorting competition, causing a misuse of Council powers and functioning detrimental to the internal market. On 16 April 2013, CJEU rejected both complaints.

In March 2013, Spain filed two new actions for annulment (CJEU cases C-146/13 and C-147/13) of (part of) the two unitary patent regulations, arguing that there is a "misapplication of the Meroni case law" in the delegation of administrative tasks to the European Patent Office, as its setting and distributing of renewal fees are not subject to the necessary EU supervision. The cases were subject to court hearing on 1 July 2014. Advocate-General Yves Bot published his opinion on 18 November 2014, suggesting that both actions be dismissed (ECLI:EU:C:2014:2380 and ECLI:EU:C:2014:2381). If the Spanish complaints had been upheld by the Court, that could have delayed or blocked the introduction of the unitary patent. The court handed down its decisions on 5 May 2015 as ECLI:EU:C:2015:298 and ECLI:EU:C:2015:299, fully dismissing the Spanish claims.

== See also ==
- European patent law
- Enforcement Directive
