= Enforcement of European patents =

Enforcement only on a per-country basis

European patents are granted by the European Patent Office (EPO) under the legal provisions of the European Patent Convention (EPC). However, European patents are enforced at a national level, i.e. on a per-country basis, or, since June 1, 2023, before the Unified Patent Court (UPC). Under Article 64(3) EPC, "any infringement of a European patent shall be dealt with by national law," with the European Patent Office having no legal competence to deal with and to decide on patent infringements in the Contracting States to the EPC. A few, limited aspects relating to the infringement of European patents are however prescribed in the EPC.

Proposals have been long discussed to create a true unitary European patent system across Europe and especially across the European Union (EU), i.e. a European patent system wherein the enforcement of European-wide patents would be dealt at a supranational level rather than at a national level. These projects include the European Union patent (formerly named "Community patent") and the European Patent Litigation Agreement (EPLA). The European patent with unitary effect and the UPC entered into force on June 1, 2023, whereas the EPLA proposal has been dropped.

Until June 1, 2023, the enforcement of European patents was therefore characterized by a fragmented system with "variegated national approaches towards patent-related litigations and (...) the possibility of having opposite decisions (and hence outcome) in case of parallel litigations."

== Extent of protection ==
A first aspect relating to the infringement of European patents which is prescribed in the EPC is the extent of protection conferred by a European patent. Article 69(1) EPC reads:

The extent of the protection conferred by a European patent or a European patent application shall be determined by the claims. Nevertheless, the description and drawings shall be used to interpret the claims.

In other words, the "extent of the protection" conferred by a European patent is determined primarily by reference to the claims of the European patent (rather than by the disclosure of the specification and drawings, as in some older patent systems), though the description and drawings are to be used as interpretive aids in determining the meaning of the claims. A "Protocol on the Interpretation of Article 69 EPC" provides further guidance, that claims are to be construed using a "fair" middle position, neither "strict, literal" nor as mere guidelines to considering the description and drawings, though of course even the protocol is subject to national interpretation. The authentic text of a European patent application and of a European patent are the documents in the language of the proceedings.

== Products directly obtained by a process ==
A second aspect relating to the infringement of European patents is prescribed in Article 64(2) EPC. The EPC requires that national courts must consider the "direct product of a patented process" to be an infringement. Article 64(2) EPC reads:

If the subject-matter of the European patent is a process, the protection conferred by the patent shall extend to the products directly obtained by such process.

== Other aspects, including costs ==
All other substantive rights attached to a European patent in a Contracting State, such as what acts constitute infringement (indirect and divided infringement, infringement by equivalents, extraterritorial infringement, infringement outside the term of the patent with economic effect during the term of the patent, infringement of product claims by processes for making or using, exports, assembly of parts into an infringing whole, etc.), the effect of prosecution history on interpretation of the claims, remedies for infringement or bad faith enforcement (injunction, damages, attorney fees, other civil penalties for willful infringement, etc.), equitable defenses, coexistence of an EP national daughter and a national patent for identical subject matter, ownership and assignment, extensions to patent term for regulatory approval, etc., are expressly remitted to national law.

Not only the national judicial procedures differ, the litigation costs and duration may significantly vary from one country to another.

"Litigation costs vary significantly across jurisdictions. The United Kingdom is by far the most expensive jurisdiction among EPC member states. The cost is much higher than in the three other jurisdictions, and is nearly as high as their cumulated costs. The litigation costs in Germany, France and the Netherlands are similar."

== Cross-border injunctions not available regarding validity ==
For a period in the late-1990s, national courts issued cross-border injunctions covering all EP jurisdictions regarding patent validity, but this has been limited by the European Court of Justice. In two cases in July 2006 interpreting Articles 6.1 and 16.4 of the Brussels Convention, the European Court of Justice held that European patents are national rights that must be enforced nationally, that it was "unavoidable" that questions regarding validity and the registration of the same European patent have to be litigated in each relevant national court, even if the lawsuit is against the same group of companies, and that cross-border injunctions regarding validity are not available.

== See also ==
- Brussels regime
- European patent law
- Spider in the web doctrine
