= Klaus Grabinski =

Klaus Grabinski is a German judge. As of 2026, he is President of the Court of Appeal and chairperson of the Presidium of the Unified Patent Court (UPC).
