= Unified Patent Court's opt-out provisions =

Proprietors of and applicants for European patents (Note: This possibility is also available to holders of supplementary protection certificates (SPCs) issued for a product protected by a European patent.) have the possibility to opt out their European patents or patent applications from the exclusive competence of the Unified Patent Court (UPC). An opt-out most notably prevents a competitor from challenging the validity of the European patent centrally before the UPC (by filing an action for revocation before the UPC), thus allowing the proprietor to avoid putting all his eggs (i.e., all national parts of the European patent) in one basket.

The possibility to opt out is open until one month before the end of a seven-year transitional period (Note: The transitional period may be extended by up to seven years.) after the entry into force of the UPC Agreement (UPCA) on June 1, 2023 but is no longer available if an action has already been brought before the UPC. (Note: This applies no matter whether the action is admissible or not.) The possibility to opt out is not available for European patents with unitary effect, which are also called "unitary patents". (Note: If a European patent application is opted out and if unitary effect is subsequently registered for the European patent granted on the basis of the opted-out application, the opt-out will cease to have effect. That is, the opt-out is deemed to be withdrawn.) An opt-out can be withdrawn at any time "unless an action has already been brought before a national court".

Since the UPCA's "sunrise period" started on March 1, 2023, Applications to opt out can be filed with the Registry of the UPC using the UPC's case management system (CMS). Applications to opt out cannot be filed with the European Patent Office (EPO), even though information about opt-outs is expected to also be available from the European Patent Register. Only published patent applications can be opted out, and a European patent can only be opted out "in respect of all EPC contracting states for which the patent was granted". No fee is payable to the Court for lodging an Application to opt out.

== See also ==
- Opt-out, a method by which an individual can avoid receiving unsolicited product or service information
