= Enhanced cooperation =

European Union procedure

In the European Union (EU), enhanced cooperation (previously known as closer cooperation) is a procedure where a minimum of nine EU member states are allowed to establish advanced integration or cooperation in an area within EU structures but without the other member states being involved. As of October 2017, this procedure is being used in the fields of the Schengen acquis, divorce law, patents, property regimes of international couples, and European Public Prosecutor and is approved for the field of a financial transaction tax.

This is distinct from the EU opt-out, that is a form of cooperation between EU member states within EU structures, where it is allowed for a limited number of states to refrain from participation (e.g. EMU, Schengen Area). It is further distinct from Mechanism for Cooperation and Verification and permanent acquis suspensions, whose lifting is conditional on meeting certain benchmarks by the affected member states.

== History ==
Enhanced cooperation, at that time known as closer cooperation, was introduced by the Treaty of Amsterdam for community, judicial cooperation and criminal matters. The Treaty of Nice simplified the mechanism: the right of veto which the Member States enjoyed over the establishment of enhanced cooperation has disappeared (except in the field of foreign policy), the number of Member States required for launching the procedure has changed from the majority to the fixed number of eight Member States. It also introduced cooperation for the Common Foreign and Security Policy, except for defence matters. At the same time, it stipulated that acts adopted within an enhanced cooperation do not form part of the Union acquis that new member states have to adopt. It also renamed closer cooperation to enhanced cooperation. The Treaty of Lisbon extended cooperation to include defence and additionally envisions the possibility for establishment of a permanent structured cooperation in defence. A minimum requirement of nine member states was also introduced. The provisions governing enhanced cooperation are now detailed in the Treaty on European Union (Article 20) and Treaty on the Functioning of the European Union (Article 326-334).

The Schengen Agreement adoption is considered a historical inspiration for formalising the mechanism of Enhanced cooperation. It was created by European Communities member states only, but outside of its structures, in part owing to the lack of consensus amongst all member states over whether it had the competence to abolish border controls, and in part because those ready to implement the idea did not wish to wait for others. As there was no Enhanced cooperation mechanism back then it was impossible to establish it inside the Community structures from the start, but afterwards the Schengen Agreement was subsumed into European Union law by the Treaty of Amsterdam as the rules of the Schengen Area.

== Usage ==
Enhanced cooperation allows for a minimum of nine member states (which amounts to one-third at the moment) to co-operate within the structures of the EU without all member states. This allows them to move at different speeds, and towards different goals, than those outside the enhanced cooperation area. It is designed to overcome paralysis, where a proposal is blocked by the veto of an individual state or a small group who do not wish to be part of the initiative. It does not however allow for an extension of powers outside those permitted by the treaties of the European Union and is only allowed as a last resort where objectives cannot be achieved normally. It may not discriminate against member states, it must further the objectives in the treaties and may not fall within an area which is of exclusive competence of the EU.

The mechanism needs a minimum of nine Member States, who file a request with the European Commission. If the Commission accepts it then it has to be approved by a qualified majority of all member states to proceed. A member may not veto the establishment of enhanced cooperation except for foreign policy.

=== Currently in force ===
==== Schengen acquis ====
The Schengen acquis was originally established on an intergovernmental basis, but was later on integrated as an enhanced cooperation (at that time known as closer cooperation) into the framework of the European Union by the Treaty of Amsterdam. Ireland and the United Kingdom obtained opt-outs from the Schengen cooperation, allowing them to opt out from legal acts that build upon the Schengen acquis on a case-by-case basis. Formally speaking, the other member states are authorized to establish an enhanced cooperation among themselves and make use of the treaty provisions on such cooperations whenever Ireland (and previously also the United Kingdom) choose to opt out from a legal act that build upon the Schengen acquis.

However, the provisions on enhanced cooperation for the Schengen acquis differ somewhat from the provisions for other enhanced cooperations. For instance, the member states are automatically authorized to initiate an enhanced cooperation as soon as Ireland opt out; no separate decision has to be made in the Council. Furthermore, the Schengen acquis forms an integral part of the Union law that every acceding member state has to adopt, reflecting the provisions on enhanced cooperations in force before the Treaty of Nice.

==== Applicable law to divorce (Rome III) ====
The 17 EU member states participating in the applicable divorce law regulation. EU member states not participating

With the rise in cross border divorce in the EU, common rules were put forward to settle the issue of under which law trans-national couples can divorce in the EU. In July 2008 nine member states put forward a proposal to use enhanced cooperation: Austria, France, Greece, Hungary, Italy, Luxembourg, Romania, Slovenia and Spain. Belgium, Germany, Lithuania and Portugal were considering joining them.

At a meeting of the justice ministers on 25 July 2008, the nine states decided to formally seek the measure of enhanced cooperation; eight states (the nine states above minus France) formally requested it from the European Commission on 28 July 2008. On 24 March 2010, when the law was formally proposed by the commission, Bulgaria was the tenth state to join the aforementioned eight and France. Belgium, Germany and Latvia formally joined them on 28 May 2010, while Greece withdrew.

MEPs backed the proposal in June 2010 with fourteen states willing to adopt the proposed cooperation: Austria, Belgium, Bulgaria, France, Germany, Hungary, Italy, Latvia, Luxembourg, Malta, Portugal, Romania, Slovenia and Spain. These states were then authorised by the council to proceed with enhanced cooperation on 12 July 2010. Council Regulation (EU) No 1259/2010, also known as the Rome III Regulation, was adopted on 20 December 2010 and came into force in the 14 participating states on 21 June 2012. Other EU Member state are permitted to sign up to the pact at a later date. Lithuania became the first state to join the agreement when they were approved by the commission on 21 November 2012. The provisions of the agreement applied to Lithuania as of 22 May 2014. Greece's participation was approved by the commission on 27 January 2014, making them the 16th member state to join the regulation, which applied to it as of 29 July 2015. Estonia's participation was approved by the Commission in August 2016, and the regulation applied to the member state as of 11 February 2018.

==== Unitary patent ====
EU member states applying the unitary patent (UPC Agreement in force) EU member states participating in the unitary patent regulation which have not ratified the UPC Agreement (unitary patents do not apply to these states) EU member states participating neither in the unitary patent regulation nor in the UPC Agreement (eligible for participation in the future) Other parties to the European Patent Convention (no participation possible)

The unitary patent, formally a "European patent with unitary effect", is the second case of enhanced cooperation adopted by the European Commission and Parliament. 26 Member States, all except Spain and Croatia (which acceded to the EU following the unitary patents adoption), participate in the unitary patent. Towards the end of 2010, twelve states (Denmark, Estonia, Finland, France, Germany, Lithuania, Luxembourg, the Netherlands, Poland, Slovenia, Sweden, and the United Kingdom) proposed enhanced cooperation to work around disagreements with Italy and Spain over what languages a European patent would be translated into. The unitary patent would be examined and granted in one of the existing official languages of the European Patent Office – English, French or German. Following the Commission approval of the plan on 14 December 2010, the Council of the European Union requested the European Parliament's consent to use of enhanced cooperation for a unitary patent on 14 February 2011 with the participation of 25 member states (all but Italy and Spain). The Parliament approved it the next day and the Council authorised enhanced cooperation on 10 March 2011. On 13 April 2011 the Commission adopted a proposal for a Council Regulation implementing enhanced cooperation. During the European Council of 28–29 June 2012, agreement was reached on the provisions between the 25 member states. The necessary EU-legislation was approved by the European Parliament on 11 December 2012, and the regulations were approved 17 December 2012. Following a request by the government of Italy, it became a participant of the unitary patent regulations in September 2015.

The enhanced cooperation measures entered into force in January 2013, and will apply to a participating member state from the date when the related Agreement on a Unified Patent Court enters into force for the state. The UPC agreement has been signed by 25 EU member states, including all states participating in the enhanced cooperation measures except Poland; while Italy, on the other hand, signed the UPC agreement prior to joining the enhanced cooperation measures for a unitary patent. Poland decided to wait to see how the new patent system works before joining due to concerns that it would harm their economy. Entry into force of the UPC took place for the first group of ratifiers on 1 June 2023.

==== Property regimes of international couples ====
EU member states participating EU member states not participating

In June 2016, the Council of the European Union authorised 18 Member States of the European Union to initiate an enhanced cooperation in the area of jurisdiction, applicable law and the recognition and enforcement of decisions on the property regimes of international couples, covering both matters of matrimonial property regimes and the property consequences of registered partnership. Later that month, enhanced cooperation was implemented through Regulations EU 2016/1103 for married couples and EU 2016/1104 for registered partnerships, both of which will fully apply from 29 January 2019.

==== Ukraine Support Loan ====
In January 2025, the European Commission proposed legislation to establish a €90 billion euro loan fund for Ukraine, to support it during its ongoing invasion by Russia. The funds will cover 2026 and 2027, with approximately €60 billion allocated military support and the remainder for general budgetary support. Due to objections from Czech Republic, Hungary and Slovakia, the remaining 24 member states proceeded to establish the fund using enhanced cooperation, which was authorized by the Council of the European Union on 29 January 2026. The adoption of regulation establishing the fund was approved in February 2026 and finalised on 22 April 2026 after Viktor Orbán lifted Hungary's veto.

=== Proposals ===
==== Financial transaction tax ====
EU member states requesting to participate EU member states not participating

After discussions to establish a European Union financial transaction tax (FTT), which would tax financial transactions between financial institutions, failed to establish unanimous support due objections from the United Kingdom and Sweden, a group of states began pursuing the idea of utilising enhanced cooperation to implement the tax. Nine states (Austria, Belgium, Finland, France, Germany, Greece, Italy, Portugal and Spain) signed a letter in February 2012 requesting that a FTT be implemented. After their parliamentary election in March 2012, Slovakia joined the list of states supporting the FTT. On 16 July 2012, Hungary introduced a unilateral 0.1 percent FTT to be implemented in January 2013.

In October 2012, after discussions failed to establish unanimous support for an EU-wide FTT, the European Commission proposed that the use of enhanced cooperation should be permitted to implement the tax in the states which wished to participate. The proposal, supported by 11 EU member states (Austria, Belgium, Estonia, France, Germany, Greece, Italy, Portugal, Slovakia, Slovenia and Spain), was approved in the European Parliament in December 2012 and the Council in January 2013. On 14 February, the European Commission put forward a revised proposal for the details of the FTT to be enacted under enhanced cooperation. The proposal was approved by the European Parliament in July 2013, and must now be unanimously approved by the 11 initial participating states before coming into force.

The legal service of the Council of the European Union concluded in September 2013, that the European Commission's proposal would not tax "systemic risk" activities but only healthy activities, and that it was incompatible with the EU treaty on several grounds while also being illegal because of "exceeding member states' jurisdiction for taxation under the norms of international customary law". The Financial Transaction Tax can no longer be blocked by the Council of the European Union on legal grounds, but each individual EU member state is still entitled to launch legal complaints against a finally approved FTT to the European Court of Justice, potentially annulling the scheme. On 6 May 2014, ten out of the initial eleven participating member states (all except Slovenia) agreed to seek a "progressive" tax on equities and "some derivatives" by 1 January 2016, and aimed for a final agreement on the details to be negotiated and unanimously agreed upon later in 2014. With negotiations ongoing into 2016, Estonia formally withdrew from the FTT enhanced cooperation procedure on 16 March 2016, leaving 10 participating states.

In October 2025 the European Commission announced that it planned to withdraw the proposed directive on the FTT within six months. It formally withdrew the proposal in October 2026.

=== Former ===
If the participation in measures adopted under the enhanced cooperation provisions ultimately extends to all member states, excluding those states with opt-outs, then they become part of the EU acquis and are no longer governed by the enhanced cooperation framework, but rather by the ordinary EU legal order.

==== European Public Prosecutor ====
EU member states participating EU member states not participating

The European Public Prosecutor's Office (EPPO) is an independent body of the European Union (EU) established under the Treaty of Lisbon between 20 of the 27 (28 at the time) member states of the EU. It is based in Luxembourg alongside the European Court of Justice and the European Court of Auditors. The role of the EPPO is to investigate and prosecute fraud against the EU budget and other crimes against the EU's financial interests including fraud concerning EU funds of over €10,000 and cross-border VAT fraud cases involving damages above €10 million. Previously only national authorities could investigate and prosecute these crimes and could not act beyond their borders.

The European Commission proposed a regulation for the establishment of the EPPO on 17 July 2013. After no consensus could be reached among all EU member states, the states which wished to participate notified the European Parliament, the Council and the commission on 3 April 2017 that they would proceed with establishing the EPPO by the use of enhanced cooperation. This was done under TFEU Article 86, which allows for a simplified enhanced cooperation procedure which does not require authorization from the council to proceed. The participating member states agreed on the legislative text to establish the EPPO on 8 June. On 12 October 2017 the regulation was given final approval by the 20 participating states. The EPPO will not have authority to begin investigating or prosecuting crimes until a decision of Commission approves this, which per the terms of the Regulation cannot take place until 3 years after the entry into force of the Regulation in November 2017.

The Netherlands officially requested to join EPPO on 14 May 2018, which was approved by the commission on 1 August 2018. Malta requested to join on 14 June 2018, and their participation was approved on 7 August 2018.

On 6 May 2021 the Commission's decision launching operations was adopted, with a starting date of 1 June 2021.

On 5 January 2024 Poland submitted an application to join to the European Commission, which was approved on 29 February 2024. On 5 June 2024 Sweden notified its request to participate in the EPPO to the Council of Ministers and the EU Commission, which was approved on 16 July 2024.

The European Commission adopted a decision the 10 July 2026 confirming Hungary's participation in the EPPO, following Hungary's request to join it in May 2026. As the last two non-participating member states, Denmark and Ireland, have opt-outs from the Area of freedom, security and justice policy area, the EPPO Regulation ceased to be an act adopted under enhanced cooperation became fully part of the EU acquis. As a result, any future member state acceding to the European Union will be required to participate in the EPPO.

== Other arrangements between European Union member states ==
A number of other agreements between a subset of EU member states to deepen integration have been concluded outside the framework of EU law. Some of these have subsequently been replaced by EU regulations, such as the Brussels Convention and the Rome Convention. The European Commission proposed in July 2015 to also integrate the Euro Plus Pact, European Fiscal Compact and the Single Resolution Fund into EU law by June 2017, while planning for the European Stability Mechanism to make the same transition by 2025.

=== Permanent Structured Cooperation in Defence ===
EU member states participating EU member state not participating

The European Defence Initiative was a proposal for enhanced European Union defence cooperation presented by France, Germany, Belgium and Luxembourg in Brussels on 29 April 2003, before the extension of the coverage of the enhanced cooperation procedure to defence matters. The Treaty of Lisbon added the possibility for "those Member States whose military capabilities fulfill higher criteria and which have made more binding commitments to one another in this area with a view to the most demanding missions [to] establish permanent structured cooperation within the Union framework".

Those states shall notify their intention to the Council and to the High Representative. The Council then adopts, by qualified majority a decision establishing permanent structured cooperation and determining the list of participating Member States. Any other member state, that fulfills the criteria and wishes to participate, can join the PSCD following the same procedure, but in the voting for the decision will participate only the states already part of the PSCD. If a participating state no longer fulfills the criteria a decision suspending its participation is taken by the same procedure as for accepting new participants, but excluding the concerned state from the voting procedure. If a participating state wishes to withdraw from PSCD it just notifies the Council to remove it from the list of participants. All other decisions and recommendations of the Council concerning PSCD issues unrelated to the list of participants are taken by unanimity of the participating states.

The criteria established in the PSCD Protocol are the following:

- co-operate and harmonise requirements and pool resources in the fields related to defence equipment acquisition, research, funding and utilisation, notably the programs and initiatives of the European Defence Agency (e.g. Code of Conduct on Defence Procurement)
- capacity to supply, either at national level or as a component of multinational force groups, targeted combat units for the missions planned, structured at a tactical level as a battle group, with support elements including transport (airlift, sealift) and logistics, within a period of five to 30 days, in particular in response to requests from the United Nations Organization, and which can be sustained for an initial period of 30 days and be extended up to at least 120 days
- capable of carrying out in the above timeframes the tasks of joint disarmament operations, humanitarian and rescue tasks, military advice and assistance tasks, conflict prevention and peace-keeping tasks, tasks of combat forces in crisis management, including peace-making and post-conflict stabilisation

On 7 September 2017 an agreement was made between EU foreign affairs ministers to move forward with PESCO with 10 initial projects. The agreement was signed on 13 November by 23 of the 28 member states. Ireland and Portugal notified the High Representative and the Council of the European Union of their desire to join PESCO on 7 December 2017. Denmark did not originally participate as it had an opt-out from the Common Security and Defence Policy, nor did the United Kingdom, which withdrew from the EU in 2020. Malta opted-out as well.

However, following the Russian invasion of Ukraine in February 2022, the Danish parliament adopted a proposal in favour of Denmark participating in the Common Security and Defence Policy, including the European Defence Agency and PESCO, on 8 April 2022. Danish voters approved ending the opt-out in a 1 June 2022 referendum, which became effective 1 July. Subsequently, Denmark proceeded to consider participating in PESCO, which was approved by Parliament in March 2023. The Council of the EU approved Denmark joining PESCO on 23 May 2023.

=== Open Method of Coordination ===
The Open Method of Coordination is a method of governance in the European Union, based on the voluntary cooperation of its member states. The open method rests on soft law mechanisms such as guidelines and indicators, benchmarking and sharing of best practice. This means that there are no official sanctions for laggards. Rather, the method's effectiveness relies on a form of peer pressure and naming and shaming, as no member state wants to be seen as the worst in a given policy area.

==== Euro Plus Pact ====
Euro Plus Pact participants Eurozone participants Non-Eurozone participants Other EU member states

The Euro Plus Pact is an arrangement for cooperating in economic measures adopted on 25 March 2011 by the European Council through the Open Method of Coordination and includes as participants the Eurozone member states, plus Denmark, Poland and Romania.

=== Related intergovernmental treaties ===
Although not formally part of European Union law, several closely related treaties have been signed outside the framework of the EU and its predecessors between the EU member states because the EU lacked authority to act in the field. After the EU obtained such autonomy, the conventions were gradually replaced by EU instruments. Examples are the Brussels Convention of 1968 (on jurisdiction in civil matters, replaced by the Brussels I Regulation), the Rome Convention on Contractual Obligations of 1980 (on choice of law in contractual matters, replaced by the Rome I Regulation except in Denmark), the Dublin Convention of 1990 (on asylum seekers, replaced by the Dublin II Regulation), and the Europol Convention of 1995 (came under the EU's competence with the Lisbon Treaty and replaced by a Council Decision). Furthermore, several treaties have been concluded between a subset of EU member states due to a lack of unanimity. The Schengen Treaty was agreed to in 1985 in this manner, but was subsequently incorporated into EU law by the Amsterdam Treaty, with the remaining EU member states that had not signed the treaty being given an opt-out from implementing it. More recently, the Prüm Convention and European Fiscal Compact were signed as intergovernmental treaties. However, both state that the intention of the signatories is to incorporate the treaty's provisions into EU structures and that EU law should take precedence over the treaty. As well, both agreements are open to accession by any EU member state. The Treaty Establishing the European Stability Mechanism was also signed and entered into force outside of the EU framework. However, a TFEU amendment was ratified which gives the ESM a legal basis in the EU treaties.

==== Prüm Convention ====
Parties to the Prüm Convention and Prüm Decision participants Other Prüm Decision participants non-EU member states participating non-EU member states which have signed an agreement to participate

The Prüm Convention, a treaty for cooperation in criminal matters signed on 27 May 2005 by Germany, Spain, France, Luxembourg, Netherlands, Austria, and Belgium, was adopted outside of EU structures, but it asserts European Union law takes precedence over its provisions (if they are incompatible) and that it is open to accession for any member state of the EU. Part of its provisions were later subsumed into European Union law by the Prüm Decision of 2008.

==== European Stability Mechanism ====
Parties to the ESM ESM member states (all 21 eurozone states) Other EU member states (ineligible for membership)

The European Stability Mechanism (ESM) is an intergovernmental organization located in Luxembourg City, which operates under public international law for all eurozone Member States having ratified a special ESM intergovernmental treaty. It was established when the intergovernmental treaty entered into force on 27 September 2012, as a permanent firewall for the eurozone to safeguard and provide instant access to financial assistance programmes for member states of the eurozone in financial difficulty, with a maximum lending capacity of €500 billion. It replaced two earlier temporary EU funding programmes: the European Financial Stability Facility (EFSF) and the European Financial Stabilisation Mechanism (EFSM). All new bailouts of eurozone member states will be covered by ESM, while the EFSF and EFSM will continue to handle money transfers and program monitoring for bailouts previously approved for Ireland, Portugal and Greece. Upon its founding, all 17 eurozone member states ratified the agreement to become ESM members. According to the text of the treaty, the ESM is open to accession by any EU member state once their derogation from using the euro has been lifted by the Council of the European Union. New member states must first be approved by the ESM's Board of Governors, after which they would need to ratify to the Treaty Establishing the ESM.

After Latvia's adoption of the euro on 1 January 2014 was given final approval by the Economic and Financial Affairs Council on 9 July, the ESM Board of Governors approved Latvia's membership application in October 2013. Latvia became the first state to accede to the ESM with formal membership starting on 13 March 2014, after having adopted the euro that January. Lithuania adopted the euro on 1 January 2015, and acceded to the ESM with formal membership starting on 3 February 2015. Croatia was the next state to accede effective 22 March 2023, subsequent to adopting the euro at the start of the year, while Bulgaria acceded effective 29 June 2026.

A separate treaty, amending Article 136 of the Treaty on the Functioning of the European Union (TFEU) to authorize the establishment of the ESM under EU law, entered into force on 1 May 2013. In June 2015, an updated EMU reform plan envisaged ESM should be transposed from being an intergovernmental agreement to become fully integrated into EU framework law in the medium-term (between July 2017 and 2025).

==== European Fiscal Compact ====
Parties to the Fiscal Compact Within the eurozone Outside the eurozone Outside the eurozone (not bound by fiscal or economic coordination provisions)

The European Fiscal Compact is an intergovernmental treaty dealing with fiscal integration that was signed by 25 member states of the European Union (EU) on 2 March 2012. Croatia and the Czech Republic acceded to the Fiscal Compact in 2018 and 2019 respectively. Although the European Fiscal Compact was negotiated between member states of the EU, it is not formally part of European Union law. It does, however, contain a provision to attempt to incorporate the pact into the Treaties establishing the European Union within five years of its entering into force. The treaty applies in full for those member states whose currency is the euro, whereas for other member states only the governance provisions (Title V) are applicable with the fiscal and economic provisions (Titles III and IV) only applying if the state makes a voluntary declaration to be bound by them. Since the treaty entered into force on 1 January 2013, four EU member states - Bulgaria, Croatia, Latvia and Lithuania - have adopted the euro as their currency and joined the eurozone, thus becoming bound by all provisions of the Fiscal Compact. Two non-eurozone member states, Denmark and Romania, have declared their intent to be bound by both the fiscal provisions and the economic coordination provisions of the treaty upon ratification, while the remaining non-eurozone states, Czech Republic, Hungary, Poland and Sweden, did not.

==== Unified Patent Court ====
Parties to the UPC Agreement (unitary patents apply) Signatories to the UPC Agreement (participated in the unitary patent regulation) Other unitary patent regulation participants (eligible for UPC participation) Other EU member states (eligible for UPC participation) Other EPC parties (no UPC participation possible)

After two regulations utilising enhanced cooperation to establish a European Union patent of unitary effect were approved for 25 participating states (all but Italy, Spain and Croatia, which subsequently acceded to the EU in July 2013) by the European Parliament on 11 December 2012 the documents were formally adopted as regulation EU 1257 and 1260 of 2012 on 17 December 2012, and entered into force in January 2013. The provisions apply since the accompanying Agreement on a Unified Patent Court entered into force on 1 June 2023. Due to a ruling by the Court of Justice of the European Union that the proposed Unified Patent Court (UPC) was not compatible with European Union law, it was decided that the court would be established by an intergovernmental treaty between the participating states outside the framework of the EU. The Agreement on a Unified Patent Court was published by the Council of the European Union on 11 January 2013, and was signed on 19 February 2013 by 24 EU member states, including all states participating in the enhanced cooperation measures except Bulgaria and Poland, while Italy, which did not originally join the enhanced cooperation measures but subsequently signed up, did sign the UPC agreement. The agreement is open for accession to all remaining EU member states, and Bulgaria signed the agreement on 5 March after finalizing their internal procedures.

Meanwhile, Poland decided to wait to see how the new patent system works before joining due to concerns that it would harm their economy. States which do not participate in the unitary patent regulations can still become parties to the UPC agreement, which would allow the new court to handle European patents validated in the member state. Entry into force for the UPC for 17 member states took place on 1 June 2023 after 13 states (including Germany, France and Italy as the three states with the most patents in force) ratified the Unified Patent Court agreement. On 1 September 2024 Romania became the 18th member, following its ratification in May 2024.

==== Single Resolution Fund ====
Parties to the Single Resolution Fund Within the eurozone Outside the eurozone (applying the treaty) Outside the eurozone (not applying the treaty) Signatories that have not ratified EU member states which may accede to the treaty

President of the European Council Herman Van Rompuy released a report on 26 June 2012 which called for deeper integration in the eurozone, including the establishment of a banking union encompassing direct recapitalisation of banks from the ESM, a common financial supervisor, a common bank resolution scheme and a deposit guarantee fund. The SSM Regulation was enacted through a regulation in October 2013. However, during negotiations for the Single Resolution Mechanism (SRM), which would be responsible for resolving failing banks and would establish a Single Resolution Fund (SRF) to fund their restructuring, concerns, especially by Germany, were raised that some of its provisions were incompatible with current EU treaties. As a result, the details of some aspects of the functioning of the SRF, including the transfer and mutualisation of funds from national authorities to the centralized fund, were split off from the Regulation to an Intergovernmental Agreement outside the framework of the EU. However, the treaty states that the intention of the signatories is to incorporate the treaty's provisions into EU structures within 10 years. The agreement was signed by 26 EU member states (all but Sweden and the United Kingdom) and is open to accession to any other EU member states. It entered into force on 1 January 2016, following the ratification by states representing 90% of the weighted vote of SSM and SRM participating states, but only to SSM and SRM participating states. As of February 2021, all eurozone states, and all EU member states except Denmark and Poland (which have both signed the agreement) and Sweden, have ratified the agreement. The ECB governing council decided on 24 June 2020 to establish a close cooperation agreement with the Bulgarian and Croatian central banks. The close cooperation agreements entered into force on 1 October 2020, at which point the SRF agreement applied to them.

== Table ==
Cooperation agreements amongst a subset of EU member states
| Member State | Enhanced cooperation | | | Former enhanced cooperation | Permanent Structured Cooperation in Defence | Open Method of Coordination | Related intergovernmental treaties | | | | |
| Member State | Applicable divorce law | Unitary patent | Property regimes of international couples | European Public Prosecutor | Permanent Structured Cooperation in Defence | Euro Plus | Prüm Convention | European Stability Mechanism | Fiscal Compact | Unified Patent Court | Single Resolution Fund |
|---|---|---|---|---|---|---|---|---|---|---|---|
| Austria | P | P | P | P | P | P | P | P | P | P | P |
| Belgium | P | P | P | P | P | P | P | P | P | P | P |
| Bulgaria | P | P | P | P | P | P | P | P | P | P | P |
| Cyprus | | D | P | P | P | P | | P | P | S | P |
| Croatia | | | P | P | P | | | P | P | | P |
| Czech Republic | | D | P | P | P | | | N/A | D | S | D |
| Denmark | | P | | | P | P | | N/A | P | P | S |
| Estonia | P | P | | P | P | P | P | P | P | P | P |
| Finland | | P | P | P | P | P | P | P | P | P | P |
| France | P | P | P | P | P | P | P | P | P | P | P |
| Germany | P | P | P | P | P | P | P | P | P | P | P |
| Greece | P | D | P | P | P | P | I | P | P | S | P |
| Hungary | P | D | | P | P | | P | N/A | D | S | D |
| Ireland | | D | | I | P | P | | P | P | S | P |
| Italy | P | P | P | P | P | P | I | P | P | P | P |
| Latvia | P | P | | P | P | P | | P | P | P | P |
| Lithuania | P | P | | P | P | P | | P | P | P | P |
| Luxembourg | P | P | P | P | P | P | P | P | P | P | P |
| Malta | P | P | P | P | I | P | | P | P | P | P |
| Netherlands | | P | P | P | P | P | P | P | P | P | P |
| Poland | | D | | P | P | P | | N/A | D | I | S |
| Portugal | P | P | P | P | P | P | I | P | P | P | P |
| Romania | P | P | | P | P | P | P | N/A | P | P | D |
| Slovakia | | D | | P | P | P | P | P | P | S | P |
| Slovenia | P | P | P | P | P | P | P | P | P | P | P |
| Spain | P | | P | P | P | P | P | P | P | | P |
| Sweden | | P | P | P | P | | I | N/A | D | P | |
Former member state
| United Kingdom | | W | | | | | | | | W | |

- P — Regulation/Treaty in force
- F — Participation formalized/Treaty ratified, but not in effect
- D — Derogation from full participation
- S — Signed the Treaty
- I — Announced interest in participation
- N/A — Not eligible to become a party as it is not a member of the eurozone
- W — Participation formalized/Treaty ratified, but withdrew from the EU before it went into effect

== See also ==
- Community method
- Differentiated integration
- European integration and Agencies of the European Union with various examples of participation by non-EU states
- Interstate compact
- Mechanism for Cooperation and Verification
- Multi-speed Europe
- Open Method of Coordination
- Opt-outs in the European Union
- Symbols of the European Union – adopted by a subset of EU member states
- 28th regime

== Literature ==
- Hermann-Josef Blanke: Art. 20 EUV, Kommentar, in: Grabitz/Hilf/Nettesheim (EL 42, September 2010)
