= European Patent Litigation Agreement =

The draft European Patent Litigation Agreement (EPLA), or formally the Draft Agreement on the establishment of a European patent litigation system, was a proposed patent law agreement aimed at creating an "optional protocol to the European Patent Convention (EPC) which would commit its signatory states to an integrated judicial system, including uniform rules of procedure and a common appeal court". It differed from the Unified Patent Court Agreement in that the EPLA negotiations were coordinated from the side of the European Patent Office, rather than from the European Council and Commission and therefore also offered the possibility for non-EU states to participate.

The EPLA was a proposed alternative to a set of proposed Community patent regulations. The European Commission regarded the negotiations on the EPLA as unlawful, although in 2006 it had gained a considerable ground among patent practitioners and national patent judges. The EPLA proposal was essentially dropped in 2007 after the Legal Service of European Parliament issued an opinion that the EPLA would prima facie constitute a breach of Article 292 of the EC Treaty and thus the European Community and its member states could not participate. Many of its provisions were subsequently incorporated into the Agreement on a Unified Patent Court.

== Background ==
Under Article 64(3) of the European Patent Convention, any infringement of a European patent is dealt with under national law (i.e. the law of one of the 38 member states to the European Patent Convention). Additionally, once the 9-month opposition period under Article 99 EPC has expired, there is no centralised way of challenging the validity of a granted patent, leaving proceedings also there only to national law.

Furthermore, Brussels I Regulation "on jurisdiction and the recognition and enforcement of judgments in civil and commercial matters", valid for 26 European Patent Convention members (all European Union members except Denmark) does not according to a 2008 judicial opinion in the UK "fully consider[~~ed~~] the problems posed by intellectual property rights". Such disputes are typically based on parallel national rights rather than European-wide rights. As a consequence, parties wishing to litigate a patent often have to litigate as much about where and when disputes should be heard and decided as about the real underlying dispute.

== History ==
In 1999, a Working Party on Litigation was set up by member states of the European Patent Organisation to propose an optional agreement on the creation of such a central judicial system. At its fifth meeting on 19 and 20 November 2003, the Working Party came up with a draft agreement and a draft statute for the European Patent Court. The EPO level proposal parallelized a similar EU level proposal for a Luxembourg European Patent Court by the European Commission and Council in conjunction with the community patent.

In 2006, the European Commission launched a public consultation on future patent policy in Europe, where the EPLA featured next to the community patent, harmonisation and mutual recognition of national patents, and general issues. Both proponents and critics of the EPLA spoke out at the ensuing hearing on 12 July 2006.

On 12 July 2006, Charlie McCreevy, European Commissioner for Internal Market and Services, said "the European Patent Litigation Agreement is seen as a promising route towards more unitary jurisdiction" while closing the above-mentioned public hearing on future patent policy in Europe.

In October 2006 the European Parliament adopted a resolution on Future action in the field of patents. As regard to the EPLA it considered "that the proposed text needs significant improvements, which address concerns about democratic control, judicial independence and litigation costs, and a satisfactory proposal for the Rules of Procedure of the EPLA Court;" and asked its Legal Service to provide an interim legal opinion on a potential overlap with the acquis communautaire.

In November 2006, an informal panel of judges from different European countries met in San Servolo, Italy, and adopted rules of procedures for the EPLA court. They signed a Resolution, the so-called "Second Venice Resolution".

In February 2007, an interim legal opinion of the Legal Service of the European Parliament was non-officially published and provided a negative opinion on the EPLA. The opinion concludes that the EPLA, specifically compliance by the Member States of the European Union with Article 98 EPLA, would prima facie constitute a breach of Article 292 of the EC Treaty ("Member States undertake not to submit a dispute concerning the interpretation or application of the Treaties to any method of settlement other than those provided for therein") and took into account that member states of the EU had not competence where the EU already had legislated and that the European Union already had legislated in the field of Intellectual Property. As a result, the European Community's competence would be exclusive for the matters governed by EPLA and Member States therefore would not be entitled on their own to conclude that Agreement.

Earlier, on 30 January 2007, Sir Nicholas Pumfrey, a British judge supporting the EPLA, is reported to have told the audience at a seminar in London that it appeared that the EPLA had "finally died". "It is a minor but quite important disaster. We thought we had done it", he added.

Thus, it became apparent in 2006-2007 that the countries which are members of the European Union did not have the competence to institute such a system, as long as it fell completely outside the European Union's legal framework. Later, in 2011, the Court of Justice of the EU eventually issued its Opinion 1/09 that the envisaged court system was not compatible with EU law.

== Name ==
The agreement was called "European Patent Litigation Protocol" (EPLP) before being renamed "European Patent Litigation Agreement" (EPLA) for reasons of international law.

== See also ==
- European patent law
- Community patent
- London Agreement
- Brussels Regime, i.e. Brussels Convention, the Lugano Convention, and the Brussels I Regulation (Council Reg (EC) 44/2001)
- Directive on the enforcement of intellectual property rights
- Directive on criminal measures aimed at ensuring the enforcement of intellectual property rights (proposed)
- Unified Patent Court
