= Unitary patent =

Type of patent in the European Union

European patent with unitary effect
EU members participating in the unitary patent regulation which have also ratified the UPC Agreement
(unitary patents cover these states)

EU members participating in the unitary patent regulation which have not ratified the UPC Agreement
(unitary patents do not yet apply to these states)

EU members neither participating in the unitary patent regulation nor in the UPC Agreement
(eligible for participation in the future)

Other European Patent Convention parties
(no participation possible)

A European patent with unitary effect, also known as a unitary patent, is a European patent that has a common legal status throughout all the participating states. The stated aims are to make access to the patent system "easier, less costly and legally secure within the European Union".

States may participate in the enhanced cooperation regarding the unitary patent by ratifying the Agreement on a Unified Patent Court (UPC Agreement). As of June 2022, all European Union member states participate, except Spain and Croatia. (Note: The 16 EU countries have ratified the UPC as of June 2022 are: Austria, Belgium, Bulgaria, Denmark, Estonia, Finland, France, Italy, Latvia, Lithuania, Luxembourg, Malta, Netherlands, Portugal, Slovenia, Sweden)

Infringement and revocation proceedings for unitary patents are conducted before the Unified Patent Court (UPC). The court decisions have a uniform effect in the participating member states as a whole, rather than in each country individually. The initiative replaces validation of the European patent in the individual countries concerned. Therefore, this eliminates scenarios in which a patent may be invalidated by courts in one participating member state yet upheld by courts in another.

When a member state ratifies the UPC Agreement and it enters into force, all new European patents with unitary effect are also granted in that territory. However, previously granted unitary patents do not automatically get their unitary effect extended to the new member state.

A patent's proprietor may request unitary effect within one month of being granted a European patent. A unitary patent may be only limited, transferred or revoked, or lapse, in respect of all the participating member states. Licensing is however possible for part of the unitary territory. The unitary patent may coexist with nationally enforceable patents ("classical" patents) in the non-participating states.

European patents are granted in English, French, or German, and the unitary effect will not require further translations after a transition period. (Note: There is a transition period of maximum 12 years from 1 June 2023 during which one translation must be filed, either into English if the application is in French or German, or into any EU official language if the application was in English.) The maintenance fees of the unitary patents are lower than the sum of the renewal fees for national patents of the corresponding area, being equivalent to the combined maintenance fees of Germany, France, the UK and the Netherlands (although the UK is no longer participating following Brexit).

Various initiatives dating to the 1970s established the concept of "European Community Patents" and later "European Union patents" (the name used in the EU treaties, which serve as the legal basis for EU competency), shortened to "EC patents", "Community Patents", "COMPATs" and "EU patents". However, these patents were not unitary, so regulators of each member state could confirm or deny the application in their territory.

On 17 December 2012, the European Council and European Parliament agreed on the Regulations 1257/2012 and 1260/2012 that make the unitary patent possible through enhanced cooperation at EU level. The legality of the two regulations was challenged by Spain and Italy, but all their claims were rejected by the European Court of Justice. Italy subsequently joined the unitary patent regulation in September 2015,

The unitary patent system applies since 1 June 2023, the date of entry into force of the UPC Agreement.

== Background ==
=== Legislative history ===
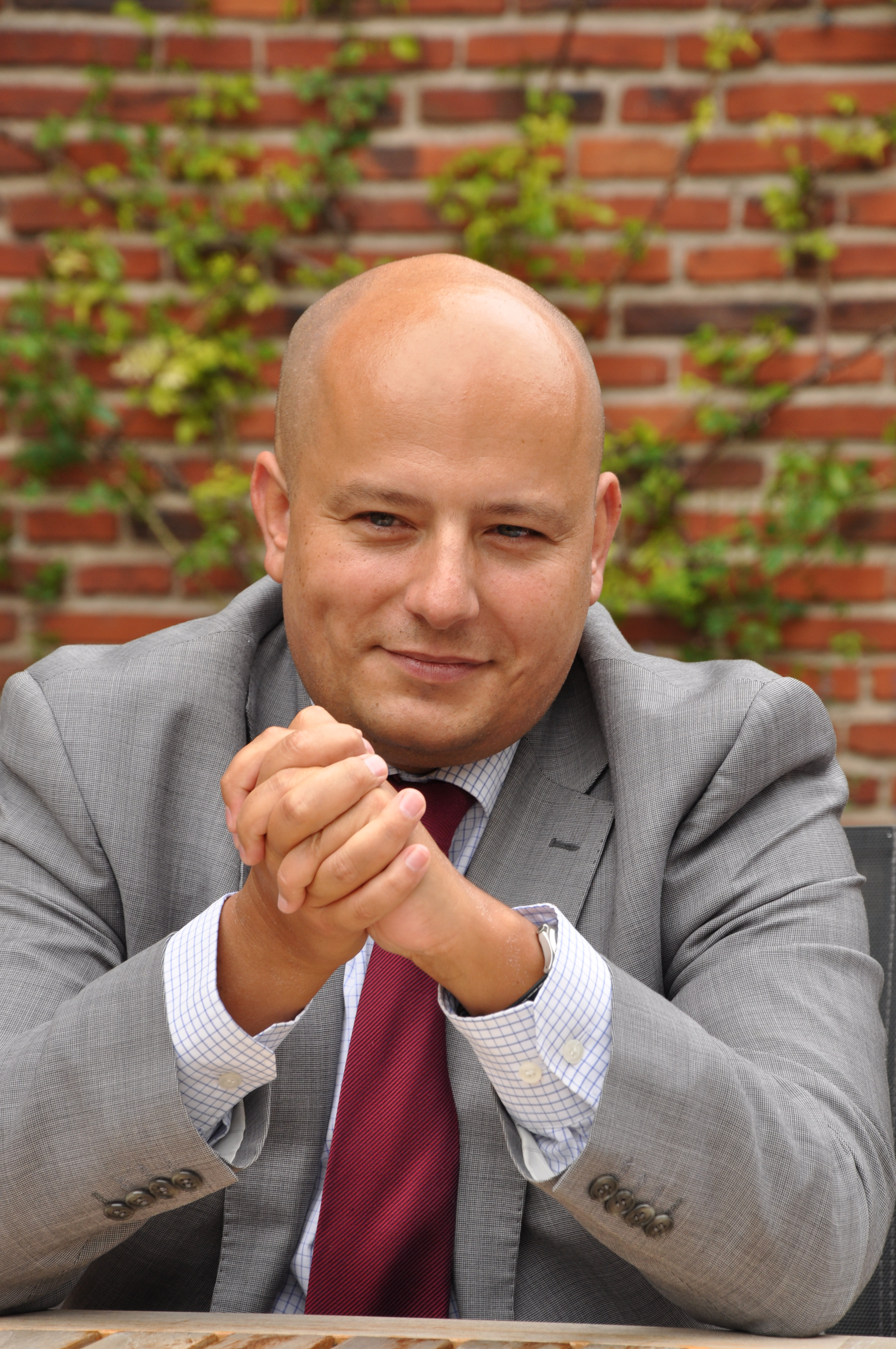
In 2011, Mikołaj Dowgielewicz, Polish Minister for European and Economic Affairs, said: "We have our backs to the wall: one or two member states are not willing to compromise and there will not be a breakthrough before the end of our Presidency."

In 2009, three draft documents were published regarding a community patent: a European patent in which the European Community was designated:

1. Council regulation on the community patent,
2. Agreement on the European and Community Patents Court (open to the European Community and all states of the European Patent Convention)
3. Decision to open negotiations regarding this Agreement

Based on those documents, the European Council requested on 6 July 2009 an opinion from the Court of Justice of the European Union, regarding the compatibility of the envisioned Agreement with EU law: "'Is the envisaged agreement creating a Unified Patent Litigation System (currently named European and Community Patents Court) compatible with the provisions of the Treaty establishing the European Community?’"

In December 2010, the use of the enhanced co-operation procedure, under which Articles 326–334 of the Treaty on the Functioning of the European Union provides that a group of member states of the European Union can choose to co-operate on a specific topic, was proposed by twelve Member States to set up a unitary patent applicable in all participating European Union Member States. The use of this procedure had only been used once in the past, for harmonising rules regarding the applicable law in divorce across several EU Member States.

In early 2011, the procedure leading to the enhanced co-operation was reported to be progressing. Twenty-five Member States had written to the European Commission requesting to participate, with Spain and Italy remaining outside, primarily on the basis of ongoing concerns over translation issues. On 15 February, the European Parliament approved the use of the enhanced co-operation procedure for unitary patent protection by a vote of 471 to 160, and on 10 March 2011 the Council gave their authorisation. Two days earlier, on 8 March 2011, the Court of Justice of the European Union had issued its opinion, stating that the draft Agreement creating the European and Community Patent Court would be incompatible with EU law. The same day, the Hungarian Presidency of the Council insisted that this opinion would not affect the enhanced co-operation procedure.

In November 2011, negotiations on the enhanced co-operation system were reportedly advancing rapidly—too fast, in some views. It was announced that implementation required an enabling European Regulation, and a Court agreement between the states that elect to take part. The European Parliament approved the continuation of negotiations in September. A draft of the agreement was issued on 11 November 2011 and was open to all member states of the European Union, but not to other European Patent Convention states. However, serious criticisms of the proposal remained mostly unresolved. A meeting of the Competitiveness Council on 5 December failed to agree on the final text. In particular, there was no agreement on where the Central Division of a Unified Patent Court should be located, "with London, Munich and Paris the candidate cities."

The Polish Presidency acknowledged on 16 December 2011 the failure to reach an agreement "on the question of the location of the seat of the central division." The Danish Presidency therefore inherited the issue. According to the President of the European Commission in January 2012, the only question remaining to be settled was the location of the Central Division of the Court. However, evidence presented to the UK House of Commons European Scrutiny Committee in February suggested that the position was more complicated. At an EU summit at the end of January 2012, participants agreed to press on and finalise the system by June. On 26 April, Herman Van Rompuy, President of the European Council, wrote to members of the council, saying "This important file has been discussed for many years and we are now very close to a final deal,.... This deal is needed now, because this is an issue of crucial importance for innovation and growth. I very much hope that the last outstanding issue will be sorted out at the May Competitiveness Council. If not, I will take it up at the June European Council." The Competitiveness Council met on 30 May and failed to reach agreement.

A compromise agreement on the seat(s) of the unified court was eventually reached at the June European Council (28–29 June 2012), splitting the central division according to technology between Paris (the main seat), London and Munich. However, on 2 July 2012, the European Parliament decided to postpone the vote following a move by the European Council to modify the arrangements previously approved by MEPs in negotiations with the European Council. The modification was considered controversial and included the deletion of three key articles (6–8) of the legislation, seeking to reduce the competence of the European Union Court of Justice in unitary patent litigation. On 9 July 2012, the Committee on Legal Affairs of the European Parliament debated the patent package following the decisions adopted by the General Council on 28–29 June 2012 in camera in the presence of MEP Bernhard Rapkay. A later press release by Rapkay quoted from a legal opinion submitted by the Legal Service of the European Parliament, which affirmed the concerns of MEPs to approve the decision of a recent EU summit to delete said articles as it "nullifies central aspects of a substantive patent protection". A Europe-wide uniform protection of intellectual property would thus not exist with the consequence that the requirements of the corresponding EU treaty would not be met and that the European Court of Justice could therefore invalidate the legislation. By the end of 2012 a new compromise was reached between the European Parliament and the European Council, including a limited role for the European Court of Justice. The Unified Court will apply the Unified Patent Court Agreement, which is considered national patent law from an EU law point of view, but still is equal for each participant. [However the draft statutory instrument aimed at implementation of the Unified Court and UPC in the UK provides for different infringement laws for: European patents (unitary or not) litigated through the Unified Court; European patents (UK) litigated before UK courts; and national patents]. The legislation for the enhanced co-operation mechanism was approved by the European Parliament on 11 December 2012 and the regulations were signed by the European Council and European Parliament officials on 17 December 2012.

On 30 May 2011, Italy and Spain challenged the council's authorisation of the use of enhanced co-operation to introduce the trilingual (English, French, German) system for the unitary patent, which they viewed as discriminatory to their languages, with the CJEU on the grounds that it did not comply with the EU treaties. In January 2013, Advocate General Yves Bot delivered his recommendation that the court reject the complaint. Suggestions by the Advocate General are advisory only, but are generally followed by the court. The case was dismissed by the court in April 2013, however Spain launched two new challenges with the EUCJ in March 2013 against the regulations implementing the unitary patent package. The court hearing for both cases was scheduled for 1 July 2014. Advocate-General Yves Bot published his opinion on 18 November 2014, suggesting that both actions be dismissed (ECLI:EU:C:2014:2380 and ECLI:EU:C:2014:2381). The court handed down its decisions on 5 May 2015 as ECLI:EU:C:2015:298 and ECLI:EU:C:2015:299 fully dismissing the Spanish claims. Following a request by its government, Italy became a participant of the unitary patent regulations in September 2015.

=== European patents ===
European patents are granted in accordance with the provisions of the European Patent Convention (EPC), via a unified procedure before the European Patent Office (EPO). While upon filing of a European patent application, all 40 Contracting States are automatically designated, a European patent becomes a bundle of "national" European patents upon grant. In contrast to the unified character of a European patent application, a granted European patent has, in effect, no unitary character, except for the centralized opposition procedure (which can be initiated within 9 months from grant, by somebody else than the patent proprietor), and the centralized limitation and revocation procedures (which can only be instituted by the patent proprietor). In other words, a European patent in one Contracting State, i.e. a "national" European patent, (Note: There is no consistent usage of a particular expression to refer to "the European patent in a particular designated Contracting State for which it is granted". The article uses the expression "a "national" European patent") is effectively independent of the same European patent in each other Contracting State, except for the opposition, limitation and revocation procedures. The enforcement of a European patent is dealt with by national law. The abandonment, revocation or limitation of the European patent in one state does not affect the European patent in other states.

While the EPC already provided the possibility for a group of member states to allow European patents to have a unitary character also after grant, until now, only Liechtenstein and Switzerland have opted to create a unified protection area (see Unitary patent (Switzerland and Liechtenstein)).

By requesting unitary effect within one month of grant, the patent proprietor is now able to obtain uniform protection in the participating members states of the European Union in a single step, considerably simplifying obtaining patent protection in a large part of the EU. The unitary patent system co-exists with national patent systems and European patent without unitary effects. The unitary patent does not cover EPC countries that are not member of the European Union, such as UK or Turkey.

== Legal basis and implementation ==
The implementation of the unitary patent is based on three legal instruments:

- Regulation (EU) No 1257/2012 of the European Parliament and of the Council of 17 December 2012 implementing enhanced cooperation in the area of the creation of unitary patent protection;
- Council Regulation (EU) No 1260/2012 of 17 December 2012 implementing enhanced cooperation in the area of the creation of unitary patent protection with regard to the applicable translation arrangements;
- Agreement on a Unified Patent Court.

Thus the unitary patent is based on EU law as well as the European Patent Convention (EPC). Article 142 EPC provides the legal basis for establishing a common system of patents for Parties to the EPC. Previously, only Liechtenstein and Switzerland had used this possibility to create a unified protection area (see Unitary patent (Switzerland and Liechtenstein)).

=== Regulations regarding the unitary patent ===
Regulation 1257/2012 & 1260/2012
- European Union regulation
- Text adopted under the Enhanced cooperation procedure
- Title: 1257/2012: Implementing enhanced cooperation in the area of the creation of unitary patent protection 1260/2012: Implementing enhanced cooperation in the area of the creation of unitary patent protection with regard to the applicable translation arrangements
- Applicability: All current EU members, except Spain and Croatia.
- Made by: European Parliament and Council
- Made under: Article 118 of the TFEU, and Council Decision 2011/167/EU
- Journal reference: L361, 31.12.2012, p.1-8, 89-92

History
- Date made: 17 December 2012
- Entry into force: 20 January 2013
- Implementation date: 1 June 2023

The first two regulations were approved by the European Parliament on 11 December 2012, with future application set for the 25 member states then participating in the enhanced cooperation for a unitary patent (all then EU member states except Croatia, Italy and Spain). The instruments were adopted as regulations EU 1257/2012 and 1260/2012 on 17 December 2012, and entered into force in January 2013. Following a request by its government, Italy became a participant of the unitary patent regulations in September 2015.

As of March 2022, neither of the two remaining non-participants in the unitary patent (Spain and Croatia) had requested the European Commission to participate.

Although formally the Regulations will apply to all 25 participating states from the moment the UPC Agreement enters into force for the first group of ratifiers, the unitary effect of newly granted unitary patents will only extend to those of the 25 states where the UPC Agreement has entered into force, while patent coverage for other participating states without UPC Agreement ratification will be covered by a coexisting normal European patent in each of those states.

The unitary effect of unitary patents means a single renewal fee, a single ownership, a single object of property, a single court (the Unified Patent Court) and uniform protection, which means that revocation as well as infringement proceedings are to be decided for the unitary patent as a whole rather than for each country individually. Licensing is however to remain possible for part of the unitary territory.

=== Role of the European Patent Office ===
Some administrative tasks relating to the European patents with unitary effect are performed by the European Patent Office, as authorized by Article 143(1) EPC. These tasks include the collection of renewal fees and registration of unitary effect upon grant, recording licenses and statements that licenses are available to any person. Decisions of the European Patent Office regarding the unitary patent are open to appeal to the Unified Patent Court, rather than to the EPO Boards of Appeal. (Note: Article 32(1)i, Agreement on a Unified Patent Court, implementing Article 9.3 of Regulation (EU) No 1257/2012.)

=== Translation requirements for the European patent with unitary effect ===
For a unitary patent, ultimately no translation will be required (except under certain circumstances in the event of a dispute), which is expected to significantly reduce the cost for protection in the whole area. However, Regulation 1260/2012 provides that, during a transitional period of minimum six years and no more than twelve years, one translation needs to be provided. Namely, a full translation of the European patent specification needs to be provided either into English if the language of the proceedings at the EPO was French or German, or into any other EU official language if the language of the proceedings at the EPO was English. Such translation will have no legal effect and will be "for information purposes only”. In addition, machine translations will be provided, which will be, in the words of the regulation, "for information purposes only and should not have any legal effect".

==== Comparison with the current translation requirements for traditional bundle European patents ====
In several EPC contracting states, for the national part of a traditional bundle European patent (i.e., for a European patent without unitary effect), a translation has to be filed within a three-month time limit after the publication of grant in the European Patent Bulletin under Article 65 EPC, (Note: Article 2(2) EPC provides that "[t]he European patent shall, in each of the Contracting States for which it is granted, have the effect of and be subject to the same conditions as a national patent granted by that State, unless this Convention provides otherwise." The provision of Article 65 EPC may therefore be viewed as an exception to Article 2(2) EPC. See also London Agreement (2000).) otherwise the patent is considered never to have existed (void ab initio) in that state. For the 22 parties to the London Agreement, this requirement has already been abolished or reduced (e.g. by dispensing with the requirement if the patent is available in English, and/or only requiring translation of the claims).

Translation requirements for the participating states in the enhanced cooperation for a unitary patent are shown below:

| Participating member State (bold: unitary patents apply) | Translation requirements for a European patent without unitary effect | Translation requirements for a European patent with unitary effect |
|---|---|---|
| **Belgium, France, Germany,** Ireland, **Luxembourg** | None | During a transitional period of minimum 6 years and maximum 12 years: one translation, so that the unitary patent is available in English and at least another EU official language. After the transitional period: none. |
| **Latvia, Lithuania**, **Slovenia** | Claims in the official language of the concerned State | During a transitional period of minimum 6 years and maximum 12 years: one translation, so that the unitary patent is available in English and at least another EU official language. After the transitional period: none. |
| **Denmark, Finland,** Hungary, **Netherlands, Sweden** | Description in English, claims in the official language of the concerned State | During a transitional period of minimum 6 years and maximum 12 years: one translation, so that the unitary patent is available in English and at least another EU official language. After the transitional period: none. |
| **Austria, Bulgaria,** Cyprus, Czech Republic, **Estonia,** Greece, **Malta**, Poland, **Portugal, Romania**, Slovakia | Translation of the complete patent in an official language of the concerned State | During a transitional period of minimum 6 years and maximum 12 years: one translation, so that the unitary patent is available in English and at least another EU official language. After the transitional period: none. |

=== Unitary patent as an object of property ===
Article 7 of Regulation 1257/2012 provides that, as an object of property, a European patent with unitary effect will be treated "in its entirety and in all participating Member States as a national patent of the participating Member State in which that patent has unitary effect and in which the applicant had her/his residence or principal place of business or, by default, had a place of business on the date of filing the application for the European patent." When the applicant had no domicile in a participating Member State, German law will apply. Ullrich has the criticized the system, which is similar to the Community Trademark and the Community Design, as being "in conflict with both the purpose of the creation of unitary patent protection and with primary EU law."

=== Agreement on a Unified Patent Court ===
Locations of the Court of First Instance (Central division, "Court"), the Court of Appeal and the Patent Mediation and Arbitration Centre. In addition, several local and regional divisions of the Court of First Instance have been established.

The Agreement on a Unified Patent Court provides the legal basis for the Unified Patent Court (UPC): a patent court for European patents (with and without unitary effect), with jurisdiction in those countries where the Agreement is in effect. In addition to regulations regarding the court structure, it also contains substantive provisions relating to the right to prevent use of an invention and allowed use by non-patent proprietors (e.g. for private non-commercial use), preliminary and permanent injunctions. Entry into force for the UPC took place after Germany deposited its instrument of ratification of the UPC Agreement, which triggered the countdown until the Agreement's entry into force on June 1, 2023.

==== Parties ====
The UPC Agreement was signed on 19 February 2013 by 24 EU member states, including all states then participating in the enhanced co-operation measures except Bulgaria and Poland. Bulgaria signed the agreement on 5 March 2013 following internal administrative procedures. Italy, which did not originally join the enhanced co-operation measures but subsequently signed up, did sign the UPC agreement. The agreement remains open to accession for all remaining EU member states, with all European Union Member States except Spain and Poland having signed the Agreement. States which do not participate in the unitary patent regulations can still become parties to the UPC agreement, which would allow the new court to handle European patents validated in the country.

On 18 January 2019, Kluwer Patent Blog wrote, "a recurring theme for some years has been that 'the UPC will start next year'". Then, Brexit and German constitutional court complaint were considered as the main obstacles. The German constitutional court first decided in a decision of 13 February 2020 against the German ratification of the Agreement on the ground that the German Parliament did not vote with the required majority (2/3 according to the judgement). After a second vote and further, this time unsuccessful, constitutional complaints, Germany formally ratified the UPC Agreement on 7 August 2021. While the UK ratified the agreement in April 2018, the UK later withdrew from the Agreement following Brexit.

As of the entry into force of the UPC on 1 June 2023, 17 countries had ratified the Agreement. Romania ratified the agreement in May 2024, and will join as the 18th participating member on 1 September 2024.

==== Jurisdiction ====
The Unified Patent Court has exclusive jurisdiction in infringement and revocation proceedings involving European patents with unitary effect, and during a transition period non-exclusive jurisdiction regarding European patents without unitary effect in the states where the Agreement applies, unless the patent proprietor decides to opt out. It furthermore has jurisdiction to hear cases against decisions of the European Patent Office regarding unitary patents. As a court of several member states of the European Union it may (Court of First Instance) or must (Court of Appeal) ask prejudicial questions to the European Court of Justice when the interpretation of EU law (including the two unitary patent regulations, but excluding the UPC Agreement) is not obvious.

==== Organization ====
The court has two instances: a court of first instance and a court of appeal. The court of appeal and the registry have their seats in Luxembourg, while the central division of the court of first instance would have its seat in Paris. The central division has a thematic branch in Munich (the London location has yet to be replaced by a new location within the EU). The court of first instance may further have local and regional divisions in all member states that wish to set up such divisions.

=== Geographical scope of and request for unitary effect ===
While the regulations formally apply to all 25 member states participating in the enhanced cooperation for a unitary patent, from the date the UPC agreement has entered into force for the first group of ratifiers, unitary patents will only extend to the territory of those participating member states where the UPC Agreement had entered into force when the unitary effect was registered. If the unitary effect territory subsequently expands to additional participating member states for which the UPC Agreement later enters into force, this will be reflected for all subsequently registered unitary patents, but the territorial scope of the unitary effect of existing unitary patents will not be extended to these states.

Unitary effect can be requested up to one month after grant of the European patent directly at the EPO, with retroactive effect from the date of grant. However, according to the Draft Rules Relating to Unitary Patent Protection, unitary effect would be registered only if the European patent has been granted with the same set of claims (Note: A European patent may be granted by the EPO with claims which are, for one or more States, different from those applicable to the other designated States. This rare situation may arise by virtue of Rule 18(2) EPC or Rule 138 EPC.) for all the 25 participating member states in the regulations, (Note: This requires that all 25 states participating in the enhanced cooperation regulations have been designated upon filing of the European patent application. For European patent applications filed after 1 April 2009, all Contracting States party to the EPC at the time of filing of the application are automatically designated, although designations may be withdrawn before grant. It was not possible to designate Malta before it became a party to the EPC on 1 March 2007.) whether the unitary effect applies to them or not. European patents automatically become a bundle of "national" European patents upon grant. Upon the grant of unitary effect, the "national" European patents will retroactively be considered to never have existed in the territories where the unitary patent has effect. The unitary effect does not affect "national" European patents in states where the unitary patent does not apply. Any "national" European patents applying outside the "unitary effect" zone will co-exist with the unitary patent.

==== Special territories of participating member states ====
As the unitary patent is introduced by an EU regulation, it is expected to not only be valid in the mainland territory of the participating member states that are party to the UPC, but also in those of their special territories that are part of the European Union. As of April 2014, this includes the following fourteen territories:

- Cyprus: UN Buffer Zone
- Finland: Åland
- France: French Guiana, Guadeloupe, Martinique, Mayotte, Réunion, Saint Martin
- Germany: Büsingen am Hochrhein, Helgoland
- Greece: Mount Athos
- Portugal: Azores, Madeira

In addition to the territories above, the European Patent Convention has been extended by two member states participating in the enhanced cooperation for a unitary patent to cover some of their dependent territories outside the European Union: In following of those territories, the unitary patent is de facto extended through application of national (French, or Dutch) law:

- France: French Southern and Antarctic Lands, Saint Barthélemy, Saint-Pierre and Miquelon and Wallis and Futuna
- Netherlands: Caribbean Netherlands, Curaçao, Sint Maarten

However, the unitary patent does not apply in the French territories French Polynesia and New Caledonia as implementing legislation would need to be passed by those jurisdictions (rather than the French national legislation required in the other territories) and this has not been done.

== Costs ==
Yearly renewal fee for the unitary patent

The term of a unitary patent is 20 years from the filing date. An annual fee is due on the last day of the month containing the anniversary of the filing date of the corresponding European patent application and may not be paid earlier than 3 months before it falls due.

The renewal fees are planned to be based on the cumulative renewal fees due in the four countries where European patents were most often validated in 2015 (Germany, France, the UK and the Netherlands). This is despite the UK leaving the unitary patent system following Brexit. The renewal fees of the unitary patent would thus be ranging from 35 Euro in the second year to 4855 in the 20th year. The renewal fees will be collected by the EPO, with the EPO keeping 50% of the fees and the other 50% being redistributed to the participating member states.

Translation requirements as well as the requirement to pay yearly patent maintenance fees in individual countries presently renders the European patent system costly to obtain protection in the whole of the European Union.

In an impact assessment from 2011, the European Commission estimated that the costs of obtaining a patent in all 27 EU countries would drop from over 32 000 euro (mainly due to translation costs) to 6 500 euro (for the combination of an EU, Spanish and Italian patent) due to introduction of the Unitary patent. Per capita costs of an EU patent were estimated at just 6 euro/million in the original 25 participating countries (and 12 euro/million in the 27 EU countries for protection with a Unitary, Italian and Spanish patent).

How the EU Commission has presented the expected cost savings has however been sharply criticized as exaggerated and based on unrealistic assumptions. The EU Commission has notably considered the costs for validating a European patent in 27 countries while in reality only about 1% of all granted European patents are currently validated in all 27 EU states. Based on more realistic assumptions, the cost savings are expected to be much lower than actually claimed by the commission. For example, the EPO calculated that for an average EP patent validated and maintained in 4 countries, the overall savings to be between 3% and 8%.

== Statistics ==
During the first year of the unitary patent, that is, from 1 June 2023, to 31 May 2024, more than 27500 European patents with unitary effect have been registered. This corresponds to almost a quarter of all European patents granted during that period.

== Earlier attempts ==
=== 1970s and 1980s: proposed Community Patent Convention ===
Work on a Community patent started in the 1970s, but the resulting Community Patent Convention (CPC) was a failure.

The "Luxembourg Conference on the Community Patent" took place in 1975 and the Convention for the European Patent for the common market, or (Luxembourg) Community Patent Convention (CPC), was signed at Luxembourg on 15 December 1975, by the 9 member states of the European Economic Community at that time. However, the CPC never entered into force. It was not ratified by enough countries.

Fourteen years later, the Agreement relating to Community patents was made at Luxembourg on 15 December 1989. It attempted to revive the CPC project, but also failed. This Agreement consisted of an amended version of the original Community Patent Convention. Twelve states signed the Agreement: Belgium, Denmark, France, Germany, Greece, Ireland, Italy, Luxembourg, the Netherlands, Portugal, Spain, and United Kingdom. All of those states would need to have ratified the Agreement to cause it to enter into force, but only seven did so: Denmark, France, Germany, Greece, Luxembourg, the Netherlands, and United Kingdom.

Nevertheless, a majority of member states of the EEC at that time introduced some harmonisation into their national patent laws in anticipation of the entry in force of the CPC. A more substantive harmonisation took place at around the same time to take account of the European Patent Convention and the Strasbourg Convention.

=== 2000 to 2004: EU Regulation proposal ===
In 2000, renewed efforts from the European Union resulted in a Community Patent Regulation proposal, sometimes abbreviated as CPR. It provides that the patent, once it has been granted by the European Patent Office (EPO) in one of its procedural languages (English, German or French) and published in that language, with a translation of the claims into the two other procedural languages, will be valid without any further translation. This proposal is aimed to achieve a considerable reduction in translation costs.

Nevertheless, additional translations could become necessary in legal proceedings against a suspected infringer. In such a situation, a suspected infringer who has been unable to consult the text of the patent in the official language of the Member State in which he is domiciled, is presumed, until proven otherwise, not to have knowingly infringed the patent. To protect a suspected infringer who, in such a situation, has not acted in a deliberate manner, it is provided that the proprietor of the patent will not be able to obtain damages in respect of the period prior to the translation of the patent being notified to the infringer.

The proposed Community Patent Regulation should also establish a court holding exclusive jurisdiction to invalidate issued patents; thus, a Community Patent's validity will be the same in all EU member states. This court will be attached to the present European Court of Justice and Court of First Instance through use of provisions in the Treaty of Nice.

Discussion regarding the Community patent had made clear progress in 2003 when a political agreement was reached on 3 March 2003. However, one year later in March 2004 under the Irish presidency, the Competitiveness Council failed to agree on the details of the Regulation. In particular the time delays for translating the claims and the authentic text of the claims in case of an infringement remained problematic issues throughout discussions and in the end proved insoluble.

In view of the difficulties in reaching an agreement on the community patent, other legal agreements have been proposed outside the European Union legal framework to reduce the cost of translation (of patents when granted) and litigation, namely the London Agreement, which entered into force on 1 May 2008—and which has reduced the number of countries requiring translation of European patents granted nowadays under the European Patent Convention, and the corresponding costs to obtain a European patent—and the European Patent Litigation Agreement (EPLA), a proposal that has now lapsed.

==== Reactions to the failure ====
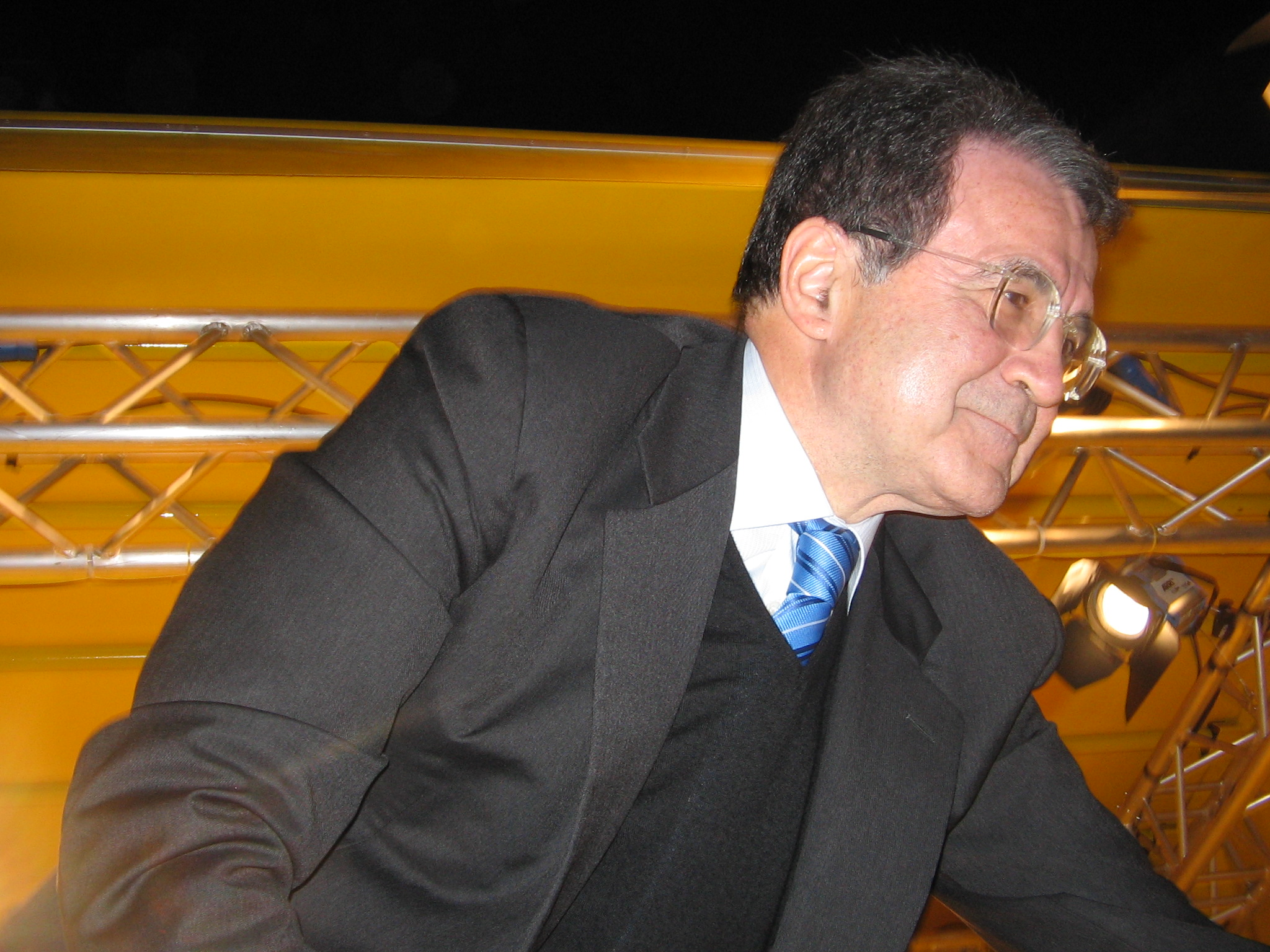
Romano Prodi (here on a picture taken in 2006) cited the failure to agree on a Europewide patent as a weak point of his five-year term as President of the European Commission.

After the council in March 2004, EU Commissioner Frits Bolkestein said that "The failure to agree on the Community Patent I am afraid undermines the credibility of the whole enterprise to make Europe the most competitive economy in the world by 2010." Adding:

It is a mystery to me how Ministers at the so-called 'Competitiveness Council' can keep a straight face when they adopt conclusions for the Spring European Council on making Europe more competitive and yet in the next breath backtrack on the political agreement already reached on the main principles of the Community Patent in March of last year. I can only hope that one day the vested, protectionist interests that stand in the way of agreement on this vital measure will be sidelined by the over-riding importance and interests of European manufacturing industry and Europe's competitiveness. That day has not yet come.

Jonathan Todd, Commission's Internal Market spokesman, declared:

Normally, after the common political approach, the text of the regulation is agreed very quickly. Instead, some Member States appear to have changed their positions. (...) It is extremely unfortunate that European industry's competitiveness, innovation and R&D are being sacrificed for the sake of preserving narrow vested interests.

European Commission President Romano Prodi, asked to evaluate his five-year term, cited as his weak point the failure of many EU governments to implement the "Lisbon Agenda", agreed in 2001. In particular, he cited the failure to agree on a Europewide patent, or even the languages to be used for such a patent, "because member states did not accept a change in the rules; they were not coherent".

=== Since 2005: stalemate and new debate ===
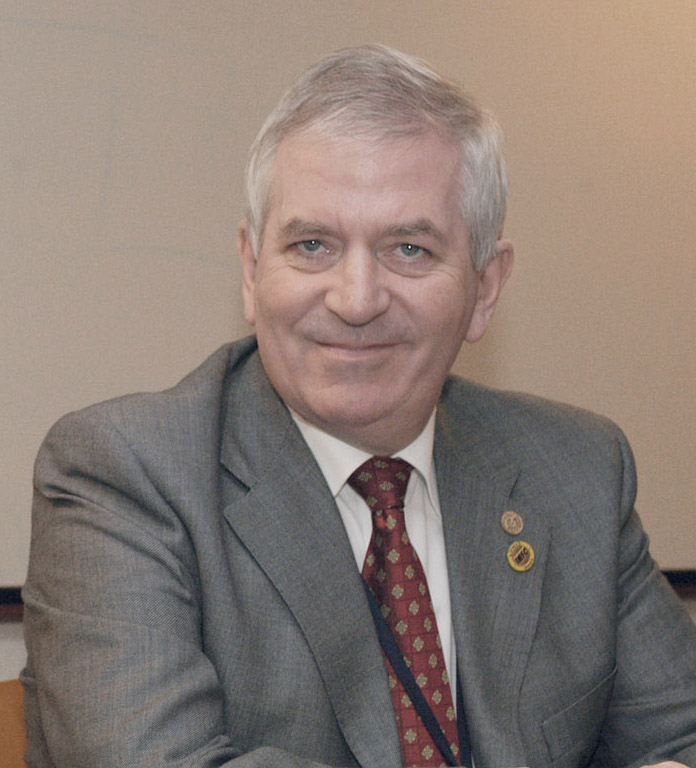
In 2007, Charlie McCreevy was quoted as saying that the proposal for an EU-wide patent was stuck in the mud.

Thus, in 2005, the Community patent looked unlikely to be implemented in the near future. However, on 16 January 2006 the European Commission "launched a public consultation on how future action in patent policy to create an EU-wide system of protection can best take account of stakeholders' needs." The Community patent was one of the issues the consultation focused on. More than 2500 replies were received. According to the European Commission, the consultation showed that there is widespread support for the Community patent but not at any cost, and "in particular not on the basis of the Common Political Approach reached by EU Ministers in 2003".

In February 2007, EU Commissioner Charlie McCreevy was quoted as saying:

The proposal for an EU-wide patent is stuck in the mud. It is clear to me from discussions with member states that there is no consensus at present on how to improve the situation.

The European Commission released a white paper in April 2007 seeking to "improve the patent system in Europe and revitalise the debate on this issue." On 18 April 2007, at the European Patent Forum in Munich, Germany, Günter Verheugen, vice-president of the European Commission, said that his proposal to support the European economy was "to have the London Agreement ratified by all member states, and to have a European patent judiciary set up, in order to achieve rapid implementation of the Community patent, which is indispensable". He further said that he believed this could be done within five years.

In October 2007, the Portuguese presidency of the Council of the European Union proposed an EU patent jurisdiction, "borrowing heavily from the rejected draft European Patent Litigation Agreement (EPLA)". In November 2007, EU ministers were reported to have made some progress towards a community patent legal system, with "some specific results" expected in 2008.

In 2008, the idea of using machine translations to translate patents was proposed to solve the language issue, which is partially responsible for blocking progress on the community patent. Meanwhile, European Commissioner for Enterprise and Industry Günter Verheugen declared at the European Patent Forum in May 2008 that there was an "urgent need" for a community patent.

=== Agreement in December 2009, and language issue ===
In December 2009, it was reported that the Swedish EU presidency had achieved a breakthrough in negotiations concerning the community patent. The breakthrough was reported to involve setting up a single patent court for the EU, however ministers conceded much work remained to be done before the community patent would become a reality.

According to the agreed plan, the EU would accede to the European Patent Convention as a contracting state, and patents granted by the European Patent Office will, when validated for the EU, have unitary effect in the territory of the European Union. On 10 November 2010, it was announced that no agreement had been reached and that, "in spite of the progress made, [the Competitiveness Council of the European Union had] fallen short of unanimity by a small margin," with commentators reporting that the Spanish representative, citing the aim to avoid any discrimination, had "re-iterated at length the stubborn rejection of the Madrid Government of taking the 'Munich' three languages regime (English, German, French) of the European Patent Convention (EPC) as a basis for a future EU Patent."

== See also ==
- Paris Convention for the Protection of Industrial Property
- Strasbourg Convention (1963)
