= Yves Bot =

French magistrate (1947–2019)

Advocate General of the European Court of Justice
- In office 7 October 2006 – 10 June 2019

Personal details
- Born: 22 August 1947 Château-Thierry, France
- Died: 9 June 2019 (aged 71)
- Profession: Lawyer, Judge

Yves Bot (August 22, 1947 – June 9, 2019) was a French magistrate who served until his death as Advocate General at the European Court of Justice.

== Biography ==
In 1995, Yves Bot was nominated by Jacques Toubon, then Minister of Justice, as prosecutor of Nanterre. He directed the courthouse of Le Mans and worked as a counsellor to Pierre Méhaignerie at the Ministry of Justice.

Between October 2002 and October 2004, he was procureur (head of the prosecution) of the Paris Court of large claims (Tribunal de grande instance). Between October 2004 and October 2006, he was procureur général (head of the prosecution and supervisor of the prosecutors of lower courts) of the Paris Court of Appeals, and as such one of the most important members of the French prosecution service. From 2006 until his death, he was Advocate General at the European Court of Justice.

== See also ==
- List of members of the European Court of Justice
