= Limitation and revocation procedures before the European Patent Office =

In European patent law, the limitation and revocation procedures before the European Patent Office (EPO) are post-grant, ex parte, administrative procedures allowing any European patent to be centrally limited by an amendment of the claims or revoked, respectively. These two procedures were introduced in the revised text of the European Patent Convention (EPC), i.e. the so-called EPC 2000, which entered into force on 13 December 2007.

The new Articles 105a, 105b and 105c EPC (of the EPC 2000) form the legal basis of the limitation and revocation procedures. These procedures are applicable since 13 December 2007 to all European patents, whether already granted or granted after that date.

== Rationale ==
Until a decision of the Enlarged Board of Appeal of the EPO of 1994, namely G 9/93 (reverting earlier decision of the same instance of 1985, namely G 1/84), it was possible for the proprietor of a European patent to oppose its own patent with the aim of centrally limiting it. Decision G 9/93 however deprived patent proprietors of this opportunity. This means that, after G 9/93, the only possibility for the proprietor of a European patent to voluntarily limit the scope conferred by its patent (e.g. for instance to strengthen the patent in view of some newly discovered prior art documents and/or in advance of envisaged litigation) was to request such limitation at the national level, i.e. before the national patent offices or competent courts of the Contracting States, if permitted. The EPC of 1973 made no provision for a limitation procedure, and a fortiori no provision for centrally limiting a European patent before the EPO after the nine-month period for filing an opposition (nine months as from the date of grant of the European patent).

The travaux préparatoires laid out the rationale for a limitation procedure:

"Limitation proceedings would enable patentees to narrow down the protection conferred by a patent post-grant by means of a simple, quick and inexpensive administrative procedure. For example, it may be necessary to limit a granted patent if, because of prior art which was not known during the examination proceedings or prior national rights not taken into account in these proceedings, the extent of the protection conferred is too great. Using the limitation procedure, patent proprietors may themselves reduce the extent of the protection claimed in a manner which is binding, and thus generally preclude disputes over the validity of a patent. Postgrant limitation is also in the public interest, because it limits the protection claimed by the patentee with effect for the general public. This creates legal certainty and facilitates access by competitors to the freely available prior art."

== Request ==
A request for limitation or revocation can only be filed by the proprietor(s) of the patent. The request may be filed at any time throughout the entire term of the European patent. According to the Guidelines for Examination, the request can even be filed after expiry of the patent.

However, the request may not be filed while opposition proceedings are pending. Precedence, i.e. priority, is always given to opposition proceedings. This prevents limitation from occurring where an opposition has already been lodged. If, at the time of filing a request for limitation or revocation, opposition proceedings are pending, the request "shall be deemed not to have been filed (see section "Special cases" - below - for the case, "likely to be infrequent in practice", where an opposition is filed "following the valid lodging of a request for limitation or revocation").

The request must be filed with the EPO and the procedure is subject to the payment of a fee. The fee is due on the date that the request is filed.

== Admissibility ==
In addition, the request should be filed in writing and should contain:

- "particulars of the proprietor of the European patent making the request (the requester)";
- "an indication of the [EPC] Contracting States for which the requester is the proprietor of the patent";
- "the number of the patent whose limitation or revocation is requested";
- "a list of the Contracting States in which the patent has taken effect";
- "where appropriate, the names and addresses of the proprietors of the patent for those Contracting States in which the requester is not the proprietor of the patent, and evidence that the requester is entitled to act on their behalf in the proceedings";
- "where limitation of the patent is requested, the complete version of the amended claims and, as the case may be, of the amended description and drawings;" and
- where the requester has appointed a representative, his name and the address of his place of business.

If these requirements are not met, the requester is invited to correct the deficiencies and, if this is not done, the Examining Division "shall reject the request as inadmissible".

== Particulars of the proceedings and effects ==
The subject of limitation or revocation proceedings is the European patent as granted or as amended in opposition or limitation proceedings before the EPO. Therefore, a European patent may be subject to several successive limitation proceedings.

The responsibility for limitation or revocation proceedings, i.e. deciding on requests for limitation or revocation, rests with the Examining Division. The process of examining an admissible request for revocation differs from the process of examining an admissible request for limitation.

As soon as a request for revocation is found to be admissible, the patent is revoked by the Examining Division.

In contrast, in order to reach a decision on the allowability of a request for limitation, the Examining Division establishes whether the requested amendment of the claims actually limits the patent or "whether it is designed to protect something else". It also establishes whether the amended claims meet the requirements of Article 84 EPC (clarity, conciseness and support of the claims) and Article 123(2) and (3) EPC (the amendments can not add subject-matter going beyond the content of the application as filed and the scope of protection cannot be extended after grant). When examining a request for limitation, "the EPO does not examine whether

- the aim of the limitation (e.g. delimitation with respect to a particular prior art) is achieved, or
- the subject-matter of the limited patent is still patentable" (this second point is intended to guarantee a quick decision).

The fact that the patentability of the limited patent is not checked by the EPO relies on the fact that the originally granted patent was valid when granted. Issues may however arise as a result of the absence of any check on patentability in rare cases where the priority right is endangered by the limitation.

Upon approval of the amended claims by the Examining Division, a fee must be paid and the amended claims must be translated in the two official languages of the EPO other than the language of the proceedings, within a period of three months. In addition, complete translations of the patent as limited, in an official language of some countries may need to be filed in the countries prescribing it.

The request for limitation or revocation has effect ab initio. This means that the limitation or revocation has effect as from the filing date of the patent application which led to the patent, rather than from the date of the decision on the limitation or revocation.

Decisions of the Examining Divisions in limitation and revocation proceedings are open to appeal.

== Special cases ==
If opposition proceedings are initiated following the valid lodging of a request for limitation or revocation, the following applies:

- "if revocation is requested, such proceedings are to continue and the patent may be revoked";
- "if limitation of the patent is requested, limitation proceedings are terminated". The limitation fee is reimbursed in this case.

A requester may request to restrict the claims with respect to one or more, but not all, Contracting States. The limitation would then result in claims being different in different Contracting States. This may however only be done in some special cases, one of them being in order to avoid conflict with national prior rights (a national prior right is a national patent filed before the filing date - or priority date - of the European patent subject to the limitation procedure but published after the filing date - or priority date - of the European patent).

== Relation with national proceedings ==
"The European limitation procedure does not ... take precedence over national proceedings (revocation proceedings in particular). Where parallel cases do occur, the national proceedings can be stayed or continued in accordance with national law or practice. Where national proceedings resulting in limitation have already been concluded, the limitation may be extended to further contracting states via European limitation proceedings (provided the requirements of the EPC are met). [In addition,] limitation of a European patent in proceedings before the EPO does not preclude further limitation in national proceedings."

== Statistics ==
One of the first requests for limitation was filed by Hewlett Packard by fax on 13 December 2007 (at about 07:30 UTC or 8.30 am CET) to limit European patent EP 1333070. The first B3 publication of a European patent specification after limitation proceedings took place on 23 July 2008 (as EP 0 591 199 B3). In the first year following the entry into force of the EPC 2000, 83 requests for limitation were filed. Of these, 72 were filed after the nine-month opposition period and 11 during the nine-month opposition period.
