= London Agreement (2000) =

Agreement on the application of Article 65 of the Convention on the Grant of European Patents
- Parties not requiring translation Parties requiring translation of the claims in the official language of the State under consideration Parties requiring the description in English, and the claims in the official language of the State under consideration European Patent Convention parties, which are not parties to the Agreement
- Signed: 17 October 2000
- Location: London, United Kingdom
- Effective: 1 May 2008
- Condition: ratification by eight states (including Germany, France and the United Kingdom)
- Signatories: 10
- Parties: 23
- Depositary: Government of the Federal Republic of Germany
- Citations: https://www.epo.org/en/legal/london-agreement
- Languages: English, French and German

The London Agreement, formally the Agreement on the application of Article 65 of the Convention on the Grant of European Patents and sometimes referred to as the London Protocol, is a patent law agreement concluded in London on 17 October 2000 and aimed at reducing the translation costs of European patents granted under the European Patent Convention (EPC). The London Agreement is an agreement between some member states of the European Patent Organisation, and has not altered other language requirements applying to European patent applications prior to grant.

The London Agreement entered into force on 1 May 2008.

== Background ==
Before 1 May 2008, once a European patent was granted or more precisely within three months (or six months for Ireland) from the date of grant, the patent had to be translated into an official language of each country in which the patentee wanted patent protection. If the translation of the European patent was not provided to the national patent office within the prescribed time limit, the patent was "deemed to be void ab initio in that State." This situation still applies in the Contracting States wherein the Agreement has not entered into force.

This situation led to high translation costs for patent holders, reduced the incentives to apply for a European patent and, many argued, the situation was a burden on the competitiveness of the European economy, compared to the situation in the United States (see also EU's Lisbon Strategy).

== Content ==
The agreement provides that Contracting States that have an official language in common with an official language of the European Patent Office, i.e. English, French or German, no longer require translation of European patents into one of their official languages. Other contracting states have to choose one of the official languages of the EPO as a "prescribed language," in which European patents have to be translated to enter into force in their country. They however keep the right to require translation of the claims in one of their official languages.

In addition, a Contracting State to the Agreement also keeps the right to require that, in case of a dispute relating to a European patent, a translation should be provided by the patentee in one of the official languages of the state.

The agreement has not altered other language provisions applying prior to grant of a European patent, such as the requirement that the claims of a European patent application have to be translated "in the two official languages of the European Patent Office other than the language of the proceedings" after receiving the communication under Rule 71(3) EPC indicating that the EPO intends to grant a European patent.

== Implementation ==
The London Agreement entered into force for 14 countries on 1 May 2008, then for Lithuania as 15th contracting state on 1 May 2009, for Hungary as 16th contracting state on 1 January 2011, for Finland as 17th contracting state on 1 November 2011, for North Macedonia as 18th contracting state on 1 February 2012, and for Albania as 19th contracting state on 1 September 2013. In September 2012, the Irish patent legislation was amended "paving the way for Ireland's accession to the London Agreement." Namely, for European patents granted in French or German on or after 3 September 2012, the filing of a translation into English is no longer required in Ireland. Formally, Ireland became the 20th contracting state to the London Agreement on 1 March 2014. The London Agreement entered into force for Norway as 21st contracting state on 1 January 2015. On 1 January 2017, Belgian law was amended "paving the way for Belgium's accession to the London Agreement." Namely, for European patents for which the mention of grant was published in the European Patent Bulletin on or after 1 January 2017, the filing of a translation "into a Belgian national language" is no longer required in Belgium no matter the language of the patent. Eventually, the London Agreement formally entered into force for Belgium as 22nd contracting state on 1 September 2019. On 1 August 2025, the London Agreement entered into force in Montenegro.

The current implementation of the London Agreement is as follows:

Implementation of the London Agreement in its Contracting States
| States dispensing with translation requirements (Article 1(1) of the London Agreement) | States requiring that the description of the European patent be supplied in the official language of the EPO prescribed by that state (as specified within the brackets) (Article 1(2) of the London Agreement) | States dispensing with translation requirements for the description (Article 1(2) of the London Agreement) | States requiring translation of the claims of the European patent into one of its official languages be supplied (as specified within the brackets) (Article 1(3) of the London Agreement) |
|---|---|---|---|
| Belgium, France, Germany, Ireland, Liechtenstein, Luxembourg, Monaco, Switzerland, United Kingdom | Albania (English), Croatia (English), Denmark (English), Finland (English), Hungary (English), Iceland (English), Montenegro (English), Netherlands (English), Norway (English), Sweden (English) | Latvia, Lithuania, North Macedonia, Slovenia | Albania (Albanian), Croatia (Croatian), Denmark (Danish), Finland (Finnish), Hungary (Hungarian), Iceland (Icelandic), Latvia (Latvian), Lithuania (Lithuanian), Montenegro (Montenegrin), North Macedonia (Macedonian), Netherlands (Dutch), Norway (Norwegian), Slovenia (Slovenian), Sweden (Swedish) |

Pursuant to article 9 of the Agreement, the regime applies to European patents in respect of which the mention of grant was published on or after 1 May 2008. The new language regime however already applied for Switzerland, Liechtenstein and the United Kingdom to European patents granted on or after 1 February 2008. Germany had some trouble with the implementation of the London Agreement. The original implementation bill was flawed due to miscalculations of the date of entry into force of the new translation requirements for European patents designating Germany. A new implementation bill was then published on 11 July 2008. The old translation requirements are no longer applicable in Germany retroactively as of 1 May 2008.

On 14 April 2010, the Court of Appeal of Paris, France, issued 24 similar court decisions, holding that, since France has ratified the London Agreement, no translation in French needed to be filed at the French Patent Office (INPI) with respect of European patents maintained as amended after opposition proceedings, and that this applied also to European patents maintained as amended for which the original mention of grant has been published prior to the entry into force of the London Agreement. The French Court of Cassation upheld these decisions in November 2011.

== History ==
The Agreement resulted from a process started at the Paris Conference on 24–25 June 1999, an intergovernmental conference of the member states of the European Patent Organisation held in Paris at the invitation of the French government. The conference adopted a mandate setting up two working parties with the task of submitting reports to the governments of the contracting states on reducing the cost of European patents and harmonising patent litigation. The first working party eventually led to the London Agreement while the second led to the proposed European Patent Litigation Agreement. More precisely, the first working party was instructed to draft an "optional protocol to the EPC, under which its signatory states undertake not to require the translation of the description of the European patent, provided that it is available in English... [or alternatively] provided that it is available in one of the official EPO languages as designated by each signatory state". The name "London Protocol" is sometimes used to refer to the London Agreement, because the initial mandate mentioned a Protocol, rather than an Agreement. (Note: Similarly, the European Patent Litigation Agreement (EPLA) was called "European Patent Litigation Protocol" before being renamed "European Patent Litigation Agreement" for reasons of international law.)

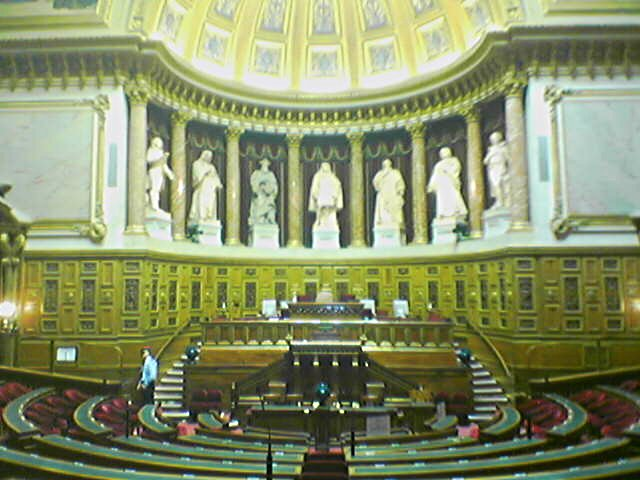
The approval of the London Agreement by the French Senate (amphitheater pictured), on 9 October 2007 was the last major step (not counting the deposit of the ratification instruments) before its entry into force.

The Agreement was then adopted at the London Conference of 2000, followed by a seven-year ratification process. On 18 April 2007, at the European Patent Forum in Munich, Germany, Angela Merkel said that she and German Justice Minister Brigitte Zypries would fight to see the London Agreement realised. She called the London Agreement "an important step in the right direction".

This agreement was signed by 10 countries, namely Denmark, France, Germany, Liechtenstein, Luxembourg, Monaco, Netherlands, Sweden, Switzerland and the United Kingdom. To enter into force, the deposit of instruments of ratification by at least eight countries, including at least France, Germany and the United Kingdom had to take place. Up to now, Monaco, Germany, United Kingdom, Switzerland, Netherlands, Liechtenstein, Luxemburg, Denmark, and France have deposited their instrument of ratification to the London Agreement while Slovenia, Iceland, Latvia and Croatia have deposited their instrument of accession (accession is also taken into account for the entry into force of the agreement). Sweden ratified on 29 April 2008.

Since France deposited its instruments of ratification on 29 January 2008, the agreement entered into force on 1 May 2008.

The ratification of the London Agreement by France, which for some time was the last missing step for the Agreement to enter into force, followed a number of steps, including the recommendation in May 2006 by the French National Assembly and the French Senate to adopt the Agreement, the approval by the French Constitutional Council, the announcement in August 2007 by the new Prime Minister François Fillon that the London Agreement would soon be ratified, the approval by the French Council of Ministers, and eventually the adoption by the National Assembly and the Senate of the ratification act on 26 September 2007 and on 9 October 2007 respectively.
