= List of decisions and opinions of the Enlarged Board of Appeal of the European Patent Office =

This is a list of decisions and opinions of the Enlarged Board of Appeal of the European Patent Office (EPO) in chronological order of their date of issuance. The list includes decisions under Article 112(1)(a) EPC (following a referral from a Board of Appeal), opinions under Article 112(1)(b) EPC (following a referral from the President of the EPO), "to ensure uniform application of the law" and to clarify or interpret important points of law in relation to the European Patent Convention, and decisions on a request for a proposal of removal from Office of a member of the Boards of Appeal under Article 23(1) EPC. The list does not include decisions on petitions for review under Article 112a EPC.

The list is incomplete.

== Decided cases ==
Keys:	Decision(s), after referral by a Board of Appeal under Art. 112(1)(a) EPC	Opinion, after referral by the President of the EPO under Art. 112(1)(b) EPC	Decision and opinion, in consolidated or identical cases	Decision in cases under Art. 23(1) EPC

=== 1980 – 1989 ===
Reference	Date of decision or opinion	Keywords and/or comments	Sources
G 1/83; G 2/83; G 3/83; G 4/83; G 5/83; G 6/83; G 7/83	5 December 1984	Patentability - Art. 52(4) and 54(5) EPC 1973 - No substantive distinction between method claims and use claims, allowability of second medical indications, although Art. 54(4) EPC 1973 appeared to only deal with first medical indications. (G 1/83, G 5/83 and G 6/83 have been published, respectively in German, English and French, the three official languages of the EPO. The four other decisions have not been published.)	
G 1/84	24 July 1985	Opposition by proprietor - overturned by G 9/93	
G 1/86	24 June 1987	Although Article 122(1) EPC implies that reestablishment of rights is available only to patent applicants and patent proprietors, "an opponent who files a notice of appeal within the two-month time limit laid down in the first sentence of Article 108 EPC but who fails to file a statement setting out the grounds of appeal within the four-month time limit laid down in the third sentence of Article 108 EPC may apply for reestablishment of rights in respect of that failure".	
G 4/88	24 April 1989	Opposition - transfer - part of the business assets	
G 2/88	12 November 1989	Art. 123(3) - change of category - use claim novel by its purpose	
G 6/88	12 November 1989	Novelty - second non-medical indication yes (Partially identical to G 2/88.)	

=== 1990 – 1994 ===
Reference	Date of decision or opinion	Keywords and/or comments	Sources
G 1/89; G 2/89	21 February 1990	Patent Cooperation Treaty - unity of invention - a priori and a posteriori	
G 5/88; G 7/88; G 8/88	16 November 1990	Filing of notice of opposition at the DPMA before July 1, 1989	
G 1/91	9 December 1991	The requirement of unity of invention (Article 82 EPC) is not applicable under Article 102(3) EPC when a European patent is amended during opposition proceedings. In other words, "when [a] patent is amended in opposition proceedings, unity no longer has any relevance." Unity of invention under Article 82 EPC is merely an administrative regulation, the function of which being fulfilled during examination proceedings.	
G 5/91	5 May 1992	Suspected partiality of a member of an Opposition Division or an Examining Division. "(...) the requirement of impartiality applies in principle also to employees of the departments of the first instance of the EPO taking part in decision-making activities affecting the rights of any party." (headnote 1)	
G 7/91; G 8/91	11 May 1992	Once an appeal is withdrawn by the sole appellant, appeal proceedings are terminated at least in so far as substantive issues are concerned. This applies to both ex parte and inter partes proceedings.	
G 3/89; G 11/91	19 November 1992	Art. 123(2) - strictly declaratory nature of Rule 88 corrections	
G 1/92	18 December 1992	"1. The chemical composition of a product is state of the art when the product as such is available to the public and can be analysed and reproduced by the skilled person, irrespective of whether or not particular reasons can be identified for analysing the composition. 2. The same principle applies mutatis mutandis to any other product."	
G 9/91	31 March 1993	Framework of opposition and appeal, insofar as the extent of the opposition is concerned: "The power of an Opposition Division or a Board of Appeal to examine and decide on the maintenance of a European patent under Articles 101 and 102 EPC depends upon the extent to which the patent is opposed in the notice of opposition pursuant to Rule 55(c) EPC 1973 [now Rule 76(2)(c) EPC]. However, subject-matters of claims depending on an independent claim, which falls in opposition or appeal proceedings, may be examined as to their patentability even if they have not been explicitly opposed, provided their validity is prima facie in doubt on the basis of already available information." (Underlining in the original; notes within brackets added). If an opponent deliberately limits "the extent to which the patent is opposed to only certain subject-matters", these "subject-matters are therefore, strictly speaking, not subject to any "opposition" in the sense of Articles 101 and 102 EPC".	
G 10/91	31 March 1993	Framework of opposition and appeal, insofar as the grounds for opposition are concerned:": 1. An Opposition Division or a Board of Appeal is not obliged to consider all the grounds for opposition referred to in Article 100 EPC, going beyond the grounds covered by the statement under Rule 55(c) EPC 1973 [now Rule 76(2)(c) EPC].; 2. In principle, the Opposition Division shall examine only such grounds for opposition which have been properly submitted and substantiated in accordance with Article 99(1) in conjunction with Rule 55(c) EPC. Exceptionally, the Opposition Division may in application of Article 114(1) EPC consider other grounds for opposition which, prima facie, in whole or in part would seem to prejudice the maintenance of the European patent.; 3. Fresh grounds for opposition may be considered in appeal proceedings only with the approval of the patentee [By application of the volenti non fit injuria doctrine]." (Notes within brackets added)	
G 4/92	22 October 1993	Oral proceedings - party absent - new facts or evidence	
G 1/93	21 February 1994	Art. 123(2) & (3) - conflict - inescapable trap	
G 7/93	13 May 1994	Amendments after approval of an application under Rule 51(6) EPC 1973; discretion of Examining Division	
G 9/93	7 June 1994	The Enlarged Board decided that an opposition to a European patent by its own proprietor is not admissible, thereby overturning earlier decision G 1/84. The decision later led to the introduction, with the EPC 2000, of the limitation and revocation proceedings.	
G 3/92	13 June 1994	Unlawful applicant. No requirement that the earlier (usurped) European patent application be pending before the EPO for the lawful applicant to be able to file a new application under Article 61(1) EPC. Dissenting opinion (Reasons for the Decision, points 8.1-8.9).	
G 9/92; G 4/93	14 July 1994	Framework of appeal - extent (decision) - reformatio in peius (With an indication of a minority opinion.)	
G 2/93	21 Decembre 1994	Time limit for deposits of biological material	
G 1/94	5 November 1994	Intervention during pending appeal proceedings - fresh grounds	
G 10/93	30 November 1994	Framework of appeal - ex parte - main aim: examination of the contested decision but no ban from introducing new grounds, facts or evidence	

=== 1995 – 1999 ===
Reference	Date of decision or opinion	Keywords and/or comments	Sources
G 4/95	19 February 1996	During oral proceedings under Article 116 EPC in the context of opposition or opposition appeal proceedings, submissions by an accompanying person cannot be made as a matter of right, but only with the permission of and at the discretion of the EPO (i.e., under the discretion of the Opposition Division or the Board of Appeal). The submissions by the accompanying person must be made under the continuing responsibility and control of the professional representative. This also applies to oral submissions by "qualified patent lawyers of countries which are not contracting states to the EPC."	
G 8/95	16 April 1996	"An appeal from a decision of an Examining Division refusing a request under [Rule 89 EPC 1973, now Rule 140 EPC] for correction of the decision to grant is to be decided by a technical board of Appeal."	
G 1/95; G 7/95	19 July 1996	Framework of opposition and appeal - Art. 100(a) - collection of grounds	
G 3/97; G 4/97	2 January 1999	It is admissible to file an opposition on behalf of third party (the "principal"), i.e. it is admissible to act as a straw man when filing an opposition. The principal can under no circumstances be regarded as a party to the proceedings. The straw man opponent has the status of opponent. Exception if there is a circumvention of law by abuse of process; in such case the opposition may be rejected as inadmissible.	
G 1/97	12 October 1999	A request to review a final decision of a Board of Appeal is not provided for in the EPC (at that time). With the entry into force of the EPC 2000 on December 13, 2007, a petition for review of a decision of a Board of Appeal may now be filed.	
G 1/98	20 December 1999	Headnote: "I. A claim wherein specific plant varieties are not individually claimed is not excluded from patentability under Article 53(b) EPC even though it may embrace plant varieties. II. When a claim to a process for the production of a plant variety is examined, Article 64(2) EPC is not to be taken into consideration. III. The exception to patentability in Article 53(b), first half-sentence, EPC applies to plant varieties irrespective of the way in which they were produced. Therefore, plant varieties containing genes introduced into an ancestral plant by recombinant gene technology are excluded from patentability."	

=== 2000 – 2004 ===
Reference	Date of decision or opinion	Keywords and/or comments	Sources
G 3/98	12 July 2000	"For the calculation of the six-month period referred to in Article 55(1) EPC [i.e., for non-prejudicial disclosures], the relevant date is the date of the actual filing of the European patent application; the date of priority is not to be taken account of in calculating this period."	
G 4/98	27 November 2000	Without prejudice to Article 67(4) EPC, the designation of a Contracting State does not retroactively lose effect if the designation fee has not been paid on time. Also, the deemed withdrawal of a designation takes effect upon expiry of the time limits in Article 79(2) and Rules 15(2), 25(2) and 107(1) 1973 EPC as appropriate (and not on expiry grace period for delayed post).	
G 1/99	4 February 2001	Framework of appeal -extent (decision) - reformatio in peius - exception	
G 3/99	18 February 2002	A joint opposition only requires one fee. Any appeal must be by a common representative. It must remain clear who the applicant(s)/appellant(s) are especially if one withdraws from proceedings	
G 2/98	31 May 2001	Priority - concept of "the same invention" in Article 87(1) EPC - direct and unambiguous derivation from the previous application required to enjoy the claimed priority right	
G 1/03; G 2/03	8 April 2004	Allowability of undisclosed disclaimers, i.e. allowability of disclaimers despite the absence of basis for the disclaimer in the application as filed. "An amendment to a claim by the introduction of a disclaimer may not be refused under Art. 123(2) EPC 1973 for the sole reason that neither the disclaimer nor the subject-matter excluded by it from the scope of the claim have a basis in the application as filed".	
G 2/02	26 April 2004	TRIPS does not entitle an applicant to claim priority from filing in a state which was not at the relevant dates a member of the Paris Convention (but was a member of the WTO/TRIPS Agreement).	

=== 2005 – 2009 ===
Reference	Date of decision or opinion	Keywords and/or comments	Sources
G 3/03	28 January 2005	Reimbursement of appeal fee in the event of interlocutory revision under Article 109(1) EPC: "In the event of interlocutory revision (...), the department of the first instance whose decision has been appealed is not competent to refuse a request of the appellant for reimbursement of the appeal fee"; composition of the competent Board of Appeal to decide upon whether a reimbursement is justified in the event that the first instance departement does not grant a request for reimbursement: "The board of appeal which would have been competent (...) to deal with the substantive issues of the appeal if no interlocutory revision had been granted is competent to decide on the request."	
G 2/04	25 May 2005	The status as an opponent cannot be freely transferred; filing of an appeal when "there is a justifiable legal uncertainty as to how the law is to be interpreted in respect of the question of who the correct party to the proceedings is".	
G 1/04	16 December 2005	Diagnostic methods practised on the human or animal body are prohibited from patentability by Article 53(c) EPC (formerly Article 52(4) EPC 1973) if the subject-matter of a claim includes features relating to: (i) "the diagnosis for curative purposes stricto sensu representing the deductive medical or veterinary decision phase as a purely intellectual exercise", (ii) the preceding constitutive steps for making the diagnosis, and (iii) "the specific interactions with the human or animal body which occur when carrying those out among these preceding steps which are of a technical nature".	
G 1/05; G 1/06	28 June 2007	Divisional applications	
G 2/06	25 November 2008	Stem cells, non-patentability of inventions involving the use and destruction of human embryos, Rule 28(c) EPC.	

=== 2010 – 2014 ===
Reference	Date of decision or opinion	Keywords and/or comments	Sources
G 1/07	15 February 2010	Methods for treatment by surgery	
G 4/08	16 February 2010	Language of the proceedings. No change of the language of a Euro-PCT application upon entry into European phase if the language of the PCT application is already in an EPO official language.	
G 2/08	19 February 2010	Patentability of a second medical indication of a known substance or composition under Article 54(5) EPC, where the second medical indication differs only from the first medical indication by the dosage regime used.	
G 3/08	12 May 2010	Patentability of programs for computers, referral dismissed	
G 1/09	27 September 2010	Following refusal of a European patent application by the Examining Division, the application remains pending until the expiry of the time limit for filing a notice of appeal, so that a divisional application under Article 76 EPC may be filed even after the refusal of an application until expiry of the time limit of two months for filing a notice of appeal under Article 108 EPC.	
G 2/07; G 1/08	9 December 2010	Essentially biological processes (Tomatoes and Broccoli)	
G 2/10	30 August 2011	An amendment to a claim which introduces a disclaimer disclaiming subject-matter that was (positively) disclosed as an embodiment of the invention in the application as filed is not allowable under Article 123(2) EPC "if the subject-matter remaining in the claim after the introduction of the disclaimer is not, be it explicitly or implicitly, directly and unambiguously disclosed to the skilled person using common general knowledge, in the application as filed".	
G 1/10	23 July 2012	A patent proprietor's request under Rule 140 EPC for a correction of the text of a patent is inadmissible, "irrespective of whether the error was made (or introduced) by the applicant or by the Examining Division" and "independently of when it is filed".	
G 1/11	19 March 2014	Delimitation of competence between the Legal Board of Appeal and its Technical Boards of Appeal: A Technical Board of Appeal, rather than the Legal Board of Appeal, is competent for an appeal against a decision of an Examining Division refusing a request for refund of a search fee under Rule 64(2) EPC, when the Examining Division's decision has not been taken together with a decision granting a European patent or refusing a European patent application.	
G 1/12	30 April 2014	Admissibility of the appeal; identity of the appellant; alleged error and correction thereof.	
G 1/13	25 November 2014	Opponent company ceased to exist, for all purposes, before issuance of the decision of the Opposition Division, and then restored -with retroactive effect under the governing national law- after filing the appeal. Admissibility of the appeal.	

=== 2015 – 2019 ===
Reference	Date of decision or opinion	Keywords and/or comments	Sources
G 3/14	24 March 2015	Examination of clarity (Article 84 EPC) in opposition proceedings: "In considering whether, for the purposes of Article 101(3) EPC, a patent as amended meets the requirements of the EPC, the claims of the patent may be examined for compliance with the requirements of Article 84 EPC only when, and then only to the extent that the amendment introduces non-compliance with Article 84 EPC."	
G 2/12; G 2/13	25 March 2015	Tomatoes II and Broccoli II (Biological processes for the production of plants, Article 53(b) EPC). Product claims directed to plants or plant material are allowable. In other words, "plants or seeds obtained through a conventional breeding methods are patentable."	
Art. 23 1/15 (G 2301/15)	17 September 2015	Request for a proposal of removal from Office: "Article 12a(5) RPEBA requires that the request under Article 12a(1) RPEBA specify individual incidents and the evidence for them, and give reasons why they constitute a serious ground within the meaning of Article 23(1) EPC."	
G 1/14	19 November 2015	Appeal lodged and appeal fee paid after expiration of the time limit under Article 108(1) EPC. Is the appeal inadmissible or not deemed to have been filed? - Inadmissible referral	
Art. 23 2/15 (G 2302/15)	11 February 2016	Request for a proposal of removal from Office: "Case terminated by withdrawal of the request from the Administrative Council. Reimbursement of all respondent's procedural costs proposed, as well as publication"	
Art. 23 1/16	14 June 2016	Request for a proposal of removal from Office: "Decision not to propose removal from office after threat by president of the European Patent Office to the Enlarged Board of Appeal; which the Administrative Council did not sufficiently distance itself of."	
G 1/15	29 November 2016	Partial priority. "The questions referred [sought] to clarify how Article 88(2), second sentence, EPC is to be applied in the light of the Enlarged Board's decision G 2/98 in cases where a claim encompasses, without spelling them out, alternative subject-matters having all the features of the claim (known as a generic "OR"-claim), and whether parent and divisional applications may be prior art under Article 54(3) EPC against one another in respect of subject-matter disclosed in a priority application but not entitled to priority." The order reads: "Under the EPC, entitlement to partial priority may not be refused for a claim encompassing alternative subject-matter by virtue of one or more generic expressions or otherwise (generic "OR"-claim) provided that said alternative subject-matter has been disclosed for the first time, directly, or at least implicitly, unambiguously and in an enabling manner in the priority document. No other substantive conditions or limitations apply in this respect."	
G 1/16	18 December 2017	Allowability of undisclosed disclaimers introduced into a patent claim: "For the purpose of considering whether a claim amended by the introduction of an undisclosed disclaimer is allowable under Article 123(2) EPC, the disclaimer must fulfil one of the criteria set out in point 2.1 of the order of decision G 1/03. The introduction of such a disclaimer may not provide a technical contribution to the subject-matter disclosed in the application as filed. In particular, it may not be or become relevant for the assessment of inventive step or for the question of sufficiency of disclosure. The disclaimer may not remove more than necessary either to restore novelty or to disclaim subject-matter excluded from patentability for non-technical reasons."	
G 1/18	July 2019	The President of the EPO referred the following question to the Enlarged Board of Appeal: "If notice of appeal is filed and/or the appeal fee is paid after expiry of the two month time limit under Article 108 EPC, is the appeal inadmissible or is it deemed not to have been filed, and must the appeal fee be reimbursed?" (same point of law as referred to in G 1/14 and G 2/14). The Enlarged Board, in its opinion issued in July 2019, explained that the appeal is deemed not to have been filed −and the appeal fee has to be reimbursed− in the three following cases (provisional translation): ": 1. (where notice of appeal was filed within the two‑month time limit prescribed in Article 108, first sentence, EPC AND the appeal fee was paid after expiry of that two‑month time limit; 2. where notice of appeal was filed after expiry of the two‑month time limit prescribed in Article 108, first sentence, EPC AND the appeal fee was paid after expiry of that two‑month time limit; and 3. where the appeal fee was paid within the two‑month time limit prescribed in Article 108, first sentence, EPC for filing notice of appeal AND notice of appeal was filed after expiry of that two‑month time limit."; This applies similarly to the filing of oppositions.	
G 2/19	16 July 2019	(1) A third party under Article 115 EPC, who has lodged an appeal against the decision to grant a European patent, has no right to an oral hearing before a Board of Appeal of the EPO about their request to order re-entry into the examination procedure in order to remedy allegedly unclear patent claims (Article 84 EPC) of the European patent. Furthermore, such an appeal has no suspensive effect. (2) Oral proceedings before the Boards of Appeal may be held in Haar without infringing Articles 113(1) and 116(1) EPC.	

=== 2020 – 2024 ===
Reference	Date of decision or opinion	Keywords and/or comments	Sources
G 3/19	14 May 2020	"[P]lants and animals exclusively obtained by essentially biological processes are not patentable". Interpretation of Article 53(b) EPC and Rule 28(2) EPC. Overturning G 2/12 and G 2/13.	
G 1/19	10 March 2021	Patentability of computer-implemented simulations.	
G 4/19	22 June 2021	There is a legal basis in the European Patent Convention (EPC) for refusing a European patent application on the ground of double patenting. More precisely: "A European patent application can be refused under Articles 97(2) and 125 EPC if it claims the same subject-matter as a European patent which has been granted to the same applicant and does not form part of the state of the art pursuant to Article 54(2) and (3) EPC." The referral does not expressly deal, however, with the question as to (i) what "the same subject-matter" exactly means, (ii) what "the same applicant" exactly means, and (iii) whether the prohibition of double patenting also applies during opposition proceedings. In its decision, the Enlarged Board of Appeal thus confirmed the EPO practice existing prior to the referral, and did so based on a comprehensive historical analysis of the travaux préparatoires of the EPC.	
G 1/21	16 July 2021	Question referred: "Is the conduct of oral proceedings in the form of a videoconference compatible with the right to oral proceedings as enshrined in Article 116(1) EPC if not all of the parties to the proceedings have given their consent to the conduct of oral proceedings in the form of a videoconference?" Answer: "During a general emergency impairing the parties' possibilities to attend in-person oral proceedings at the EPO premises, the conduct of oral proceedings before the boards of appeal in the form of a videoconference is compatible with the EPC even if not all of the parties to the proceedings have given their consent to the conduct of oral proceedings in the form of a videoconference."	
G 2/21	23 March 2023	Consideration of evidence not publicly available before the filing date of a patent ("post-published evidence"), submitted by a patentee to prove a technical effect relied on to establish inventive step of the claimed subject-matter: Yes, the Enlarged Board of Appeal held that this was allowed provided that "the skilled person, having the common general knowledge in mind, and based on the application as originally filed, would derive said effect as being encompassed by the technical teaching and embodied by the same originally disclosed invention". G 2/21 is a landmark decision on the concept of plausibility in European patent law.	
G 1/22; G 2/22	10 October 2023	Formal priority ("same applicant"): The EPO is competent to assess whether a party is entitled to claim priority under Article 87(1) EPC. However, there is a rebuttable presumption under the autonomous law of the EPC that the applicant claiming priority is indeed entitled to claim priority.	

=== From 2025 ===
Reference	Date of decision or opinion	Keywords and/or comments	Sources
G 1/24	18 June 2025	"The claims are the starting point and the basis for assessing the patentability of an invention under Articles 52 to 57 EPC. The description and drawings shall always be consulted to interpret the claims when assessing the patentability of an invention under Articles 52 to 57 EPC, and not only if the person skilled in the art finds a claim to be unclear or ambiguous when read in isolation."	
G 1/23	2 July 2025	State of the art character (within the meaning of Article 54(2) EPC) of a product when "its composition or internal structure could not be analysed and reproduced without undue burden by the skilled person before [the filing date]" - "A product put on the market before the date of filing of a European patent application cannot be excluded from the state of the art within the meaning of Article 54(2) EPC for the sole reason that its composition or internal structure could not be analysed and reproduced by the skilled person before that date."	
G 2/24	25 September 2025	Status of intervener who intervened during opposition appeal proceedings; consequence when all appeals have been withdrawn; Headnote: "After withdrawal of all appeals, appeal proceedings may not be continued with a third party who intervened during the appeal proceedings in accordance with Article 105 EPC. The intervening third party does not acquire an appellant status corresponding to the status of a person entitled to appeal within the meaning of Article 107, first sentence, EPC."	
G 1/25	3 September 2026	Headnote: "If the claims of a European patent, or patent application, are amended during proceedings before the departments of the EPO, or in appeal proceedings, and the amendment introduces an inconsistency between the amended claims and the description, including any drawings, of the patent, or application, and because of that inconsistency Articles 52 to 57, 76(1), 83, 84, 123(2) or 123(3) EPC are not complied with, it is necessary to adapt the description, including any drawings, to the amended claims so as to remove that inconsistency."	

== Pending cases ==
As of 6 August 2026, one referral is pending before the Enlarged Board of Appeal.

Reference	Date of referral	Keywords and/or comments	Sources
G 1/26	3 February 2026	Circumstances under which a referral to the Enlarged Board may be considered to be "required" under Article 112(1) EPC (question (1)). Claim interpretation in view of the description for the assessment of Article 123(2) EPC; what possible interpretations of the claim need to be originally disclosed, and to which extent the description needs to be relied upon when interpreting the claims (questions 2(a), 2(b), 3(a), 3(b)). Referral from decision T 873/24.	

== See also ==
- List of patent case law
- List of successful petitions for review under Article 112a of the European Patent Convention
