= List of successful petitions for review under Article 112a of the European Patent Convention =

As of June 2024, ten petitions for review under Article 112a EPC have been successful, i.e. held allowable by the Enlarged Board of Appeal of the European Patent Office (EPO). These allowable petitions for review are listed below in chronological order of the dates when the decisions were issued.

== Background ==
Under the European Patent Convention (EPC), a petition for review is a request to the Enlarged Board of Appeal of the European Patent Office (EPO) to review a decision of a board of appeal. The procedure was introduced in Article 112a EPC when the EPC was revised in 2000, to form the so-called "EPC 2000". A petition for review can essentially only be based on a fundamental procedural defect. Its purpose is not to obtain a reconsideration of the application of substantive law, such as points relating to patentability. The petition is a restricted form of judicial review, limited to examining serious errors of procedure which might have been committed by the Legal or Technical Boards of Appeal, prejudicing the right to a fair hearing of one or more appellants. Before the entry into force of the EPC 2000 in December 2007, it was not possible for a party who did not have his requests granted in an appeal to challenge the final decision of the Legal or Technical Board of Appeal on any grounds.

== List ==
=== R 7/09 of 22 July 2009 ===
R 7/09 was a petition for review of T 27/07 and is the very first case in which a petition for review was successful since the institution of the procedure. In that case, the Enlarged Board of Appeal held that a violation of the right to be heard (a right guaranteed by Article 113(1) EPC) occurred during the underlying appeal proceedings, because the Board of Appeal apparently failed to forward the appellant's statement of grounds of appeal to the petitioner. The petitioner was therefore unaware of the grounds for the Board's decision until receiving the actual decision. The fact that the appellant's statement of grounds of appeal could have been obtained from the electronic public file by the petitioner or its representative was not considered material, because a party has the right to receive communications through the channels provided by law.

=== R 3/10 of 29 September 2011 ===
In case T 136/09 reviewed by the Enlarged Board in R 3/10, novelty of the main request had been discussed during the oral proceedings before the Technical Board, after which, "when (...) closing the debate, the Chairman [of the Board] indicated that the Board would decide on patentability". Inventive step had, however, not been discussed. Nevertheless, the Board then decided that the main request did not comply with Article 56 EPC (inventive step), depriving the petitioner (the patent proprietor) from an opportunity to be heard on inventive step of the main request. The Enlarged Board considered this to be a violation of the petitioner right's to be heard, which arose from a misunderstanding between the Board and the petitioner. The Board apparently thought, when closing the debate, that the parties did not wish to make any submission orally on inventive step (beyond the parties' written submissions), whereas the petitioner apparently thought that they still would have an opportunity to present their arguments in that respect. The Enlarged Board set aside the decision of the Board to give an opportunity to the petitioner to be heard on inventive step.

=== R 2/14 of 22 April 2016 ===
R 2/14 concerned decision T 1627/09 where Board 3.3.08 had held that the patent under consideration violated Articles 83 and 100(b) EPC because, even though each of the steps of recloning could be performed by a skilled person, the combination of all the necessary steps created an undue burden on the skilled person trying to perform the invention. The Enlarged Board held that the decision under review did not mention the sequence of facts or arguments that had led the Board to the conclusion that the combination of steps imposed an undue burden on the skilled person. The petition for review was consequently held allowable.

=== R 3/22 of 22 November 2022 ===
In R 3/22, the appellant's representative had initially stated that the appellant was withdrawing the appeal, before withdrawing the request to withdraw the appeal the next day on the grounds that the appellant's initial instructions had been misinterpreted. The Board's Registrar then informed the appellant that the appeal proceedings were closed, the appellant requested a correction of the withdrawal of the appeal under Rule 139 EPC, and the Board's Registrar informed the appellant that the appeal proceedings had already been closed and that the Board was no longer competent for the matter. The appellant then requested a written decision by the Board, which the Board did not issue. The Enlarged Board of Appeal held that a substantial procedural violation had occurred because the Board had decided on the appeal without deciding on a relevant request (namely the request for correction of the appeal under Rule 139 EPC). The Enlarged Board of Appeal consequently reopened the appeal proceedings, but in T 695/18 the request for correction of the decision (Note: The Enlarged Board of Appeal considered that the communication from the Registrar that the appeal proceedings had already been closed and that the Board was no longer competent for the matter was a decision.) was eventually rejected.

== See also ==
- List of decisions and opinions of the Enlarged Board of Appeal of the European Patent Office
