= G 1/05 and G 1/06 =

G 1/05 and G 1/06

Enlarged Board of Appeal of the European Patent Office

Issued 28 June 2007
Board composition

Chairman: Peter Messerli
Members: S. Perryman, P. Alting Van Geusau, B. Günzel, C. Holtz, A. Nuss, Sir N. Pumfrey

Headwords

Divisional/ASTROPOWER (G 1/05), Sequences of divisionals/SEIKO (G1/06)

G 1/05 and G 1/06 are decisions of the Enlarged Board of Appeal (EBA) of the European Patent Office (EPO) that were issued on 28 June 2007 and answer questions relating to divisional applications under the European Patent Convention (EPC). The two decisions were published in the Official Journal of the EPO in May 2008.

== Background ==
Article 76(1), second sentence, EPC states that a divisional application

"may be filed only in respect of subject-matter which does not extend beyond the content of the earlier application as filed; in so far as this provision is complied with, the divisional application shall be deemed to have been filed on the date of filing of the earlier application and shall have the benefit of any right to priority."

== Questions ==
Two similar sets of legal questions have been referred to the Enlarged Board of Appeal and have been considered by the Board in consolidated proceedings.

In case T 39/03, Technical Board of Appeal 3.4.02 referred the following questions to the Enlarged Board of Appeal (considered under case number G 1/05):

"(1) Can a divisional application which does not meet the requirements of Article 76(1) EPC because, at its actual filing date, it extends beyond the content of the earlier application, be amended later in order to make it a valid divisional application?
(2) If the answer to question (1) is yes, is this still possible when the earlier application is no longer pending?
(3) If the answer to question (2) is yes, are there any further limitations of substance to this possibility beyond those imposed by Articles 76(1) and 123(2) EPC? Can the corrected divisional application in particular be directed to aspects of the earlier application not encompassed by those to which the divisional as filed had been directed?"

In case T 1409/05, Technical Board of Appeal 3.4.03 referred the following questions to the Enlarged Board of Appeal (considered under case number G 1/06):

"(1) In the case of a sequence of applications consisting of a root (originating) application followed by divisional applications, each divided from its predecessor, is it a necessary and sufficient condition for a divisional application of that sequence to comply with Article 76(1) EPC, second sentence, that anything disclosed in that divisional application be directly, unambiguously and separately derivable from what is disclosed in each of the preceding applications as filed?
(2) If the above condition is not sufficient, does said sentence impose the additional requirement

(a) that the subject-matter of the claims of said divisional be nested within the subject-matter of the claims of its divisional predecessors? or
(b) that all the divisional predecessors of said divisional comply with Article 76(1) EPC?"

== Reasoning ==
The Enlarged Board of Appeal held that non-compliance of a patent application with a substantive requirement for grant, such as the requirement regarding the content of a divisional application when filed, does not cause the application to be "invalid", but only leads to its refusal "if the deficiency is incurable or is not removed by amendment". Such non-compliance "cannot raise an automatic presumption that the application is to be refused without any prior possibility of amendment (...)."

The Board further held that Article 76(1), second sentence, EPC had a double purpose:

1. preventing applicants from putting into a divisional application new matter which could be objectionable under national security considerations, and
2. setting up the substantive requirement for the patentability of divisional applications that they may not contain added matter in relation to their parent application,

and that none of these purposes justified the invalidity of a divisional application on the grounds that it would, on filing, extend beyond the content of the earlier application.

Divisional applications are to be treated in the same manner as ordinary applications and subject to the same requirements, unless specific provisions of the EPC require something different. In other words, a divisional application is a new application which is separate and independent from the parent application, if not specifically provided otherwise.

Regarding the sequences of divisional applications, the Board held that:

"according the filing date of the first disclosure of the subject-matter concerned in the root application is only justified if the said subject-matter was disclosed in each of the preceding (earlier) applications as filed and if it was still present in each earlier predecessor application at the time the - further - divisional application was filed (...)."

== Decisions ==
The Enlarged Board eventually decided in G 1/05 that:

(1) "a divisional application which at its actual date of filing contains subject-matter extending beyond the content of the earlier application as filed can be amended later in order that its subject-matter no longer so extends",
(2) this applies "even at a time when the earlier application is no longer pending", and
(3) "furthermore, the same limitations apply to these amendments as to amendments to any other (non-divisional) applications."

In G1/06, the Board answered to the question (1) in the affirmative:

"In the case of a sequence of applications consisting of a root (originating) application followed by divisional applications, each divided from its predecessor, it is a necessary and sufficient condition for a divisional application of that sequence to comply with Article 76(1), second sentence, EPC that anything disclosed in that divisional application be directly and unambiguously derivable from what is disclosed in each of the preceding applications as filed."

The whole contents of each preceding divisional application in a sequence may be included in a new divisional application and an applicant is not restricted only to subject matter that was encompassed by the claims of a preceding divisional. In reaching this decision, the EBA confirmed that subject matter which was omitted on filing one member in a sequence of divisional applications cannot be reintroduced later and, conversely, that subject matter which was introduced on filing one member in the sequence cannot be maintained.

== Suggestions to the legislator ==
The EBA also considered some additional issues of fairness to third parties in relation to divisional applications:

"The Board finds it unsatisfactory that sequences of divisional applications each containing the same broad disclosures of the original patent application, by means of at least an unamended description, should be pending for up to twenty years. If administrative measures, such as giving priority to the examination of divisional applications and bundling and speedily deciding copending divisional applications so as to minimize the possibility for applicants to keep alive subject-matter on which the Examining Division had already given a negative opinion in one application by means of refiling the same subject-matter again and again, are not adequate, it would be for the legislator to consider where there are abuses and what the remedy could be."

== See also ==
- Divisional patent application
