= G 2/19 =

G 2/19

Enlarged Board of Appeal of the European Patent Office

ECLI:EP:BA:2019:G000219.20190716
Decision issued on 16 July 2019
Board composition

Chairman: Carl Josefsson
Members: Jochem Gröning, Ingo Beckedorf, Michael Sachs, Gérard Weiss, Gunnar Eliasson, Pascal Gryczka

Headwords

Right to be heard and correct venue for oral proceedings

G 2/19 is a decision issued by the Enlarged Board of Appeal of the European Patent Office (EPO) on 16 July 2019, which deals with three legal questions, the third relating to whether oral proceedings before the EPO Boards of Appeal may be held in Haar in the Munich district (German: Landkreis München) rather than in Munich per se, when a party objects to the oral proceedings being held in Haar. In July 2019, the Enlarged Board of Appeal decided that oral proceedings before the Boards of Appeal may be held in Haar without infringing Article 113(1) EPC and Article 116(1) EPC.

== Background ==
In October 2017, the Boards of Appeal of the EPO were relocated from the EPO main building in Munich, i.e. from the so-called "Isar building", to Haar. While, under the European Patent Convention (EPC), the European Patent Office is located in Munich with a branch in The Hague (Article 6(2) EPC), Haar is a municipality located in the Munich district (German: Landkreis München) outside Munich per se. The third question referred in decision T 831/17 by Board 3.5.03 thus boiled down to questioning whether the relocation of the Boards of Appeal to Haar was in conformity with the EPC.

== Decision ==
At the end of the oral proceedings held on July 16, 2019, the Enlarged Board of Appeal announced its decision that oral proceedings before the Boards of Appeal may be held at their location in Haar without infringing Articles 113(1) (right to be heard) and 116(1) EPC (oral proceedings). (Note: In German: "Mündliche Verhandlungen der Beschwerdekammern an deren Standort in Haar verstoßen nicht gegen die Artikel 113 (1) und 116 (1) EPÜ.")

The first two referred questions were also dealt with. The first was found to be inadmissible, while the second was answered as follows (unofficial English translation):

"A third party within the meaning of Article 115 EPC, who has lodged an appeal against the decision to grant a European patent, has no right to an oral hearing before a Board of Appeal of the European Patent Office about their request to order re-entry into the examination procedure in order to remedy allegedly unclear patent claims (Article 84 EPC) of the European patent. Such an appeal has no suspensive effect." (Note: In German: "Ein Dritter im Sinne von Artikel 115 EPÜ, der gegen die Entscheidung über die Erteilung eines europäischen Patents Beschwerde eingelegt hat, hat keinen Anspruch darauf, dass vor einer Beschwerdekammer des Europäischen Patentamtes mündlich über sein Begehren verhandelt wird, zur Beseitigung vermeintlich undeutlicher Patentansprüche (Artikel 84 EPÜ) des europäischen Patents den erneuten Eintritt in das Prüfungsverfahren anzuordnen. Eine solchermaßen eingelegte Beschwerde entfaltet keine aufschiebende Wirkung.")

The Enlarged Board's written decision was issued in September 2019.

== See also ==
- R 19/12, decision of the Enlarged Board of Appeal, following which a reform of the EPO was undertaken aiming at increasing the perception of independence of the Boards of Appeal from the executive branch of the EPO
