= G 1/21 =

G 1/21

Enlarged Board of Appeal of the European Patent Office

ECLI:EP:BA:2021:G000121.20210716
Decision issued on 16 July 2021
Board composition

Chairman: Fritz Blumer
Members: Wim van der Eijk, Tamás Bokor, Richard Arnold, Evangelos Chatzikos, Gunnar Eliasson, Andrea Ritzka

Headwords

Oral proceedings by videoconference

G 1/21 is a decision issued on 16 July 2021 by the Enlarged Board of Appeal of the European Patent Office (EPO) regarding the legality of holding oral proceedings at the EPO by videoconference without the consent of the parties. Namely, the Enlarged Board of Appeal held that "[d]uring a general emergency impairing the parties' possibilities to attend in-person oral proceedings at the EPO premises, the conduct of oral proceedings before the boards of appeal in the form of a videoconference is compatible with the EPC even if not all of the parties to the proceedings have given their consent to the conduct of oral proceedings in the form of a videoconference." The reasoning in the written decision further indicates that, if a party so requests, oral proceedings must be held in person at the EPO premises, except in absolutely exceptional cases.

== Procedural history ==
The case dealt with the following question:

Is the conduct of oral proceedings in the form of a videoconference compatible with the right to oral proceedings as enshrined in Article 116(1) EPC if not all of the parties to the proceedings have given their consent to the conduct of oral proceedings in the form of a videoconference?"

which Board 3.5.02 in case T 1807/15 referred on 12 March 2021 to the Enlarged Board of Appeal pursuant to Article 112(1)(a) EPC. Many amicus curiae briefs and third party observations were later filed in relation to the question at stake.

Following an objection raised by the appellant under Article 24(3) EPC, the Enlarged Board of Appeal issued on 17 May 2021 an interlocutory decision holding that its original chairman, the President of the Boards of Appeal Carl Josefsson, as well as another one of its members, should not take part in the referral, because they had been involved in drafting Article 15a of the Rules of Procedure of the Boards of Appeal (RPBA). Article 15a RPBA, which entered into force on 1 April 2021, allows –or at least purports to allow– the Boards of Appeal to hold oral proceedings by videoconference without the consent of the parties. The composition of the Enlarged Board of Appeal was therefore changed by an order dated 20 May 2021.

On 28 May 2021, public oral proceedings were held regarding the case, via videoconference. During these oral proceedings, a second interlocutory decision was issued, in which further objections against the composition of the Enlarged Board of Appeal were rejected as inadmissible. At the end of these oral proceedings, the Enlarged Board of Appeal then decided to postpone the oral proceedings. Oral proceedings were then resumed on 2 July 2021 and the order was then issued, without the detailed reasons, on 16 July 2021. The Enlarged Board of Appeal issued the reasons for its decision on 28 October 2021.

== Written decision ==
In its written decision, the Enlarged Board of Appeal on the one hand narrowed down the scope of the referral to oral proceedings before the Boards of Appeal (thus, not directly dealing with oral proceedings held in first-instance proceedings) and in the context of the COVID-19 pandemic, i.e. to oral proceedings held in "a period of general emergency". On the other hand, the Enlarged Board broadened the referred question to whether holding oral proceedings by videoconference was compatible not only with Article 116(1) EPC but also with Article 113 EPC. The Enlarged Board thus reformulated the referred question as follows:

During a general emergency impairing the parties' possibilities to attend in-person oral proceedings at the EPO premises, is the conduct of oral proceedings before the boards of appeal in the form of a videoconference compatible with the EPC if not all of the parties have given their consent to the conduct of oral proceedings in the form of a videoconference?

The Enlarged Board then went on to explain why, in its view, "oral proceedings in the form of a videoconference are oral proceedings within the meaning of Article 116 EPC", why telephone conferences are "clearly not suitable as a format for oral proceedings", and why "the use of video technology can make it suboptimal as a format for oral proceedings, either objectively or in the perception of the participants, but normally not to such a degree that a party's right to be heard or right to fair proceedings is seriously impaired". In other words, "oral proceedings by videoconference are oral proceedings within the meaning of Article 116 EPC and, although not fully equivalent to oral proceedings held in person, normally do not infringe a party's right to be heard or the right to fair proceedings".

The Enlarged Board further held that, under normal circumstances, oral proceedings by videoconference cannot be imposed on a party, i.e. a party has a right to in-person oral proceedings, as in-person oral proceedings are the default format. "Parties can only be denied this option for good reasons." Accordingly, the Enlarged Board answered the reformulated question as follows:

During a general emergency impairing the parties' possibilities to attend in-person oral proceedings at the EPO premises, the conduct of oral proceedings before the boards of appeal in the form of a videoconference is compatible with the EPC even if not all of the parties to the proceedings have given their consent to the conduct of oral proceedings in the form of a videoconference.
