= G 1/11 =

G 1/11
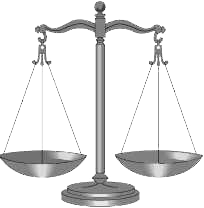

Enlarged Board of Appeal of the European Patent Office

Issued 19 March 2014
Board composition

Chairman: Wim Van der Eijk
Members: A. Klein, R. Menapace, C. Rennie-Smith, M.-B. Tardo-Dino, U. Oswald, M. Vogel

Headword

Non-refund of further search fees/BAUER

G 1/11 is a decision issued on 19 March 2014 by the Enlarged Board of Appeal of the European Patent Office (EPO), holding that a Technical Board of Appeal rather than the Legal Board of Appeal is competent for an appeal against a decision of an Examining Division refusing a request for refund of a search fee under Rule 64(2) EPC, which has not been taken together with a decision granting a European patent or refusing a European patent application. In other words, the decision deals with the delimitation of competence between the EPO's Legal Board of Appeal and its Technical Boards of Appeal.

== Background ==
Pursuant to Article 21(3) EPC, appeals at the EPO that deal with technical issues are handled by technical boards of appeal whereas appeals dealing with legal issues are handled by the Legal Board of Appeal. According to Derk Visser however, "[t]he formulation of Art.21(3) EPC in terms of procedure instead of expertise of the boards has resulted in a complicated provision including gaps (...), the interpretation of which has required a large number of decisions of boards of appeals".

In the proceedings that led to referral G 1/11, the applicant of a European patent application had paid four further search fees after the Search Division of the EPO had drawn up a partial search report (because the Search Division had found that the application lacked unity of invention). The applicant then requested their reimbursement under Rule 64(2) EPC because, in the applicant's view, the Search Division had wrongly held that the application lacked unity. The Examining Division, which then became competent, rejected the applicant's request, and the applicant appealed the rejection.

The appeal was assigned to a Technical Board of Appeal, which opted to transfer the case to the Legal Board of Appeal. The Legal Board of Appeal then referred, in its decision J 21/09, the question of its alleged competence (or not) for this issue of refund of search fees to the Enlarged Board of Appeal under Article 112(1)(a) EPC.

== Question ==
Thus, the referral to the Enlarged Board lies from decision J 21/09 by the Legal Board of Appeal. The referred question was:

Is a technical board of appeal or the Legal Board of Appeal competent to hear an appeal against an EPO examining division's decision taken separately from its decision granting a patent or refusing the application not to refund search fees under Rule 64(2) EPC?

== Answer to the referred question ==
In its answer to the referred question, the Enlarged Board of Appeal ruled that "a technical board of appeal is competent to hear an appeal against an EPO examining division's decision – taken separately from its decision granting a patent or refusing the application – not to refund search fees under Rule 64(2) EPC."

In the underlying reasons, the Enlarged Board of Appeal explained "that the Boards of Appeal should have a composition which enables them to decide all technical matters relevant to the decision with their own expertise, without calling in external experts." By doing so, the Enlarged Board of Appeal in effect closed a gap in law by assigning these cases to the Technical Boards of Appeal. According to Rudolf Teschmacher, the lacuna in the law closed by G 1/11 had been known for a long time, and could in fact have been solved in a dogmatically more convincing way by the legislator of the EPC 2000, the diplomatic conference of member states who revised the European Patent Convention (EPC).

== See also ==
- Jurisdiction
