= G 1/15 =

G 1/15

Enlarged Board of Appeal of the European Patent Office

ECLI:EP:BA:2016:G000115.20161129
Order issued on November 29, 2016; full reasoned decision issued in February 2017
Board composition

Chairman: Wim van der Eijk
Members: Per Carlson, Ingo Beckedorf, Claude Vallet, Fritz Blumer, Hugo Meinders, Werner Sieber

Headwords

Partial priority

In case G 1/15, the Enlarged Board of Appeal of the European Patent Office (EPO) affirmed the concept of partial priority. That is, a patent claim in a European patent application or European patent may partially benefit from the priority of an earlier application.

== History ==
The questions referred to the Enlarged Board of Appeal under Article 112(1)(a) EPC sought "to clarify how Article 88(2), second sentence, EPC is to be applied in the light of the Enlarged Board's decision G 2/98 in cases where a claim encompasses, without spelling them out, alternative subject-matters having all the features of the claim (known as a generic "OR"-claim), and whether parent and divisional applications may be prior art under Article 54(3) EPC against one another in respect of subject-matter disclosed in a priority application but not entitled to priority."

The case, triggered by decision T 557/13 issued on 17 July 2015 by Board of Appeal 3.3.06, had led the President of the EPO to decide that "all proceedings before EPO examining and opposition divisions in which the decision depends entirely" on the outcome of the case were to "be stayed ex officio until the Enlarged Board issues its decision". The case attracted more than thirty amicus curiae briefs. Oral proceedings were held on 7 June 2016 at the EPO in Munich, Germany.

The order, which was issued on November 29, 2016, reads:

Under the EPC, entitlement to partial priority may not be refused for a claim encompassing alternative subject-matter by virtue of one or more generic expressions or otherwise (generic "OR"-claim) provided that said alternative subject-matter has been disclosed for the first time, directly, or at least implicitly, unambiguously and in an enabling manner in the priority document. No other substantive conditions or limitations apply in this respect.

The full reasoned decision was issued in February 2017.

== See also ==
- Amendments under the European Patent Convention
