= G 1/07 =

G 1/07
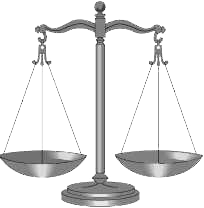

Enlarged Board of Appeal of the European Patent Office

Issued February 15, 2010
Board composition

Chairman: Peter Messerli
Members: B. Günzel, P. Alting van Geusau, U. Kinkeldey, S. Perryman, A. Pézard, J.-P. Seitz

Headwords

Treatment by surgery/MEDI-PHYSICS

G 1/07 is a decision of the Enlarged Board of Appeal of the European Patent Office (EPO), which was issued on February 15, 2010. The Enlarged Board of Appeal notably decided that, under the European Patent Convention (EPC),

"[a] claimed imaging method, in which, when carried out, maintaining the life and health of the subject is important and which comprises and encompasses an invasive step representing a substantial physical intervention on the body which requires medical expertise to be carried out and which entails a substantial health risk even when carried out with required professional care and expertise, is excluded from patentability as a method for treatment of the human or animal body by surgery pursuant to Article 53(c) EPC."
