= G 1/10 =

G 1/10
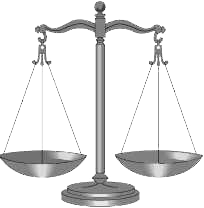

Enlarged Board of Appeal of the European Patent Office

Issued 23 July 2012
Board composition

Chairman: Wim Van der Eijk
Members: C. Rennie-Smith, B. Günzel, A. G. Klein, R. Menapace, U. Oswald, G. Weiss

Headword

Request to correct patent/FISHER-ROSEMOUNT

G 1/10 is a decision issued on 23 July 2012 by the Enlarged Board of Appeal of the European Patent Office (EPO), holding that Rule 140 EPC cannot be used to request corrections of the text of a European patent.

== Overview ==
The referral lies from interlocutory decision T 1145/09 by Technical Board of Appeal 3.5.03, who referred two questions to the Enlarged Board.

The first question was:

Is a patent proprietor's request for correction of the grant decision under Rule 140 EPC which was filed after the initiation of opposition proceedings admissible? In particular, should the absence of a time limit in Rule 140 EPC be interpreted such that a correction under Rule 140 EPC of errors in decisions can be made at any time?

The second question was:

If such a request is considered to be admissible, does the examining division have to decide on this request in ex parte proceedings in a binding manner so that the opposition division is precluded from examining whether the correction decision amounts to an unallowable amendment of the granted patent?

In its answer to the first question, the Enlarged Board of Appeal ruled that "since Rule 140 EPC is not available to correct the text of a patent, a patent proprietor's request for such a correction is inadmissible whenever made, including after the initiation of opposition proceedings." In its answer to the second question, it ruled that "in view of the answer to the first referred question, the second referred question requires no answer."

== See also ==
- Amendments under the European Patent Convention
