= G 1/12 =

G 1/12
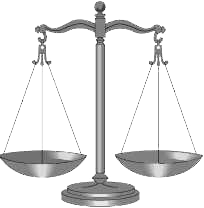

Enlarged Board of Appeal of the European Patent Office

Issued 30 April 2014
Board composition

Chairman: Wim Van der Eijk
Members: T. Kriner, R. Menapace, C. Rennie-Smith, U. Oswald, A. Pézard, M. Vogel, G. Weiss

Headword

-

G 1/12 is a decision issued on 30 April 2014 by the Enlarged Board of Appeal of the European Patent Office (EPO), holding that an appellant's identity in a notice of appeal can be corrected under Rule 101(2) EPC, provided the requirements of Rule 101(1) EPC are met. The Enlarged Board of Appeal also held that an appellant's identity can be corrected under Rule 139 EPC, first sentence, under the conditions established by the case law of the Boards of Appeal.

== Background ==
The European Patent Convention (EPC), the multilateral treaty instituting the legal system according to which European patents are granted, contains provisions allowing a party to appeal a decision issued by a first instance department of the EPO. The appeal procedure before the EPO is a judicial procedure proper to an administrative court, and the EPO Boards of Appeal have been recognised as courts, or tribunals, of an international organisation, the EPO.

When an appeal is lodged, the notice of appeal has to contain specific information including "the name and the address of the appellant", "an indication of the decision impugned", and "a request defining the subject of the appeal". The question has arisen as to whether the name of the appellant could be corrected after filing the notice of appeal, and questions have been referred to the Enlarged Board of Appeal under Article 112(1)(a) EPC in that regard.

== Questions referred to the Enlarged Board of Appeal ==
The referral to the Enlarged Board of Appeal lies from an interlocutory decision T 445/08 from Technical Board of Appeal 3.3.07. The referred questions were:

(1) When a notice of appeal, in compliance with Rule 99(1)(a) EPC, contains the name and the address of the Appellant as provided in Rule 41(2)(c) EPC and it is alleged that the identification is wrong due to an error, the true intention having been to file on behalf of the legal person which should have filed the appeal, is a request for substituting this other legal or natural person admissible as a remedy to "deficiencies" provided by Rule 101(2) EPC?

(2) If the answer is yes, what kind of evidence is to be considered to establish the true intention?

(3) If the answer to the first question is no, may the Appellant's intention nevertheless play a role and justify the application of Rule 139 EPC?

(4) If the answer to questions (1) and (3) is no, are there any possibilities other than restitutio in integrum (when applicable)?

== Answers to the referred questions ==
The Enlarged Board of Appeal answered these questions as follows:

(1) The answer to reformulated question (1) - namely whether when a notice of appeal, in compliance with Rule 99(1)(a) EPC, contains the name and the address of the appellant as provided in Rule 41(2)(c) EPC and it is alleged that the identification is wrong due to an error, the true intention having been to file on behalf of the legal person which should have filed the appeal, is it possible to correct this error under Rule 101(2) EPC by a request for substitution by the name of the true appellant - is yes, provided the requirements of Rule 101(1) EPC have been met.

(2) Proceedings before the EPO are conducted in accordance with the principle of free evaluation of evidence. This also applies to the problems under consideration in the present referral.

(3) In cases of an error in the Appellant's name, the general procedure for correcting errors under Rule 139 EPC, first sentence, is available under the conditions established by the case law of the Boards of Appeal.

(4) Given the answers to questions (1) and (3), there is no need to answer question (4).

This means that the flexible approach adopted in earlier decision T 97/98 has been confirmed. Namely, the name of the appellant may be corrected to substitute another natural or legal person for the person indicated in the notice of appeal if the real intention was to file the appeal in the name of that person.

== Practical aspects ==
As to answer (3), point 37 of the reasons for the decision G 1/12 provides practical guidance on how to correct an Appellant's identity under Rule 139 EPC, first sentence. The correction must at least satisfy the following requirements:

(a) The correction must introduce what was originally intended.

(b) Where the original intention is not immediately apparent, the requester bears the burden of proof, which must be a heavy one.

(c) The error to be remedied may be an incorrect statement or an omission.

(d) The request for correction must be filed without delay.

As to requirement (d), a decision T180/14 of April 2019 deals with a delay of four and a half years, "after the appellant had been made aware of the error for the second time". That delay did not satisfy the "without delay" requirement.

== Applicability in opposition proceedings ==
The principles laid out in G 1/12 can also be used in opposition proceedings to correct the designation of the opponent in the notice of opposition.
