= G 2/12 and G 2/13 =

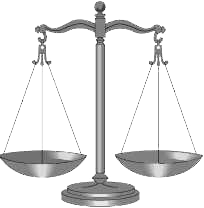
- EPO Enlarged Board of Appeal

Submitted 31 May 2012 Decided 25 March 2015
- Full case name: State of Israel - Ministry of Agriculture v Unilever N.V. & Plant Bioscience Limited v Syngenta
- Case: G 2 /12 and G 2 /13
- ECLI: ECLI:EP:BA:2015:G000212.20150325
- Chamber: Enlarged Board of Appeal
- Language of proceedings: English

Ruling
- The exclusion of essentially biological processes for the production of plants in Article 53(b) EPC does not have a negative effect on the allowability of a product claim directed to plants or plant material such as a fruit

Court composition
- President; W. van der Eijk
- Judges: I. Beckedorf; C. Floyd; K. Garnett; U. Oswald; J. Riolo; Gérard Weiss

G 2/12 (Tomatoes II) and G 2/13 (Broccoli II) are two decisions by the Enlarged Board of Appeal of the European Patent Office (EPO), which issued on 25 March 2015. The cases were consolidated and are contentwise identical. The cases concern the patentability of biological products through the description of the procedure for achieving that product (a product-by-process claim). The Enlarged Board of Appeal ruled that such products were patentable and not in conflict with Article 53(b) EPC, which does not allow patents for "essentially biological" processes.

The cases were referred to the Enlarged Board of Appeal by decisions T 1242/06 (Tomatoes II, ECLI:EP:BA:2012:T124206.20120531) and T 0083/05 (Broccoli II, ECLI:EP:BA:2007:T008305.20070522) of Board 3.3.04. The referrals followed earlier referrals of the same Board of Appeal in the same case (G 2/07 (Tomatoes) and G 2/08 (Broccoli)).

Five years later, in 2020, the Enlarged Board of Appeal overturned in G 3/19 its previous decisions G 2/12 and G 2/13. Namely, it ruled in G 3/19 that "plants and animals exclusively obtained by essentially biological processes are not patentable".

== Reception ==
The decision was viewed as a restriction of breeders' rights through patent law.

Following the decision, the European parliament adopted a non-legislative motion in which it expressed concern that the decision could spark the grant more patents on natural traits of plants introduced in new varieties and called on EU Member States (all of which are European Patent Convention parties) and the European Commission to take action. The Agriculture and Fisheries discussed the case in 2015 and referred it to the Competitiveness council which discussed it in 2016. The Dutch presidency of the EU held a symposium on the matter titled "Finding the Balance - Exploring solutions in the debate surrounding patents and plant breeders’ rights".
