= G 9/93 =

Case law in Europe

G 9/93
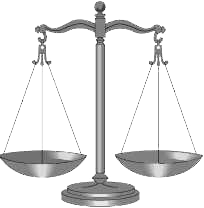

Enlarged Board of Appeal of the European Patent Office

ECLI:EP:BA:1994:G000993.19940706
Decision issued on 6 July 1994
Board composition

Chairman: P. Gori
Members: J. Brinkhof, K. Bruchhausen, P. Lançon, E. Persson, R. Schulte, P. van den Berg

Headword

Opposition by patent proprietor

G 9/93 is a decision issued on 6 July 1994 by the Enlarged Board of Appeal of the European Patent Office (EPO). Unlike the revised European Patent Convention 2000, there used to be no explicit provision in the former European Patent Convention 1973 that allowed a patent proprietor to have one's own patent revoked. A patent proprietor may, however, seek a revocation of one's own patent. For example, the patent proprietor may want to avoid costly revocation proceedings concerning a patent owned by that proprietor. In an earlier decision G 1/84, the Enlarged Board of Appeal dealt with the issue of a patent proprietor opposing one's own patent and held such oppositions admissible. The Enlarged Board of Appeal dealt with the same issue again in later decision G 9/93 and it overruled its earlier decision G 1/84 thereby holding oppositions against one's own patents inadmissible.

== Questions referred to the Enlarged Board of Appeal ==
The referral to the Enlarged Board of Appeal lies from an interlocutory decision T 788/90 from Technical Board of Appeal 3.2.01. The referred questions are:

(1) Given the Enlarged Board of Appeal's new interpretation in decision G 9/91 and opinion G 10/91 of the basis for the opposition procedure, can a European patent be opposed by its own proprietor?

(2) If so, do the Board of Appeal's powers of review in such a case depend on the extent to which the patent was opposed in the notice of opposition?

== Answer to the referred questions ==
The Enlarged Board of Appeal answered these questions as follows:

(1) A European patent cannot be opposed by its own proprietor.

== Practical aspects ==
A new provision in the form of Article 105a EPC was introduced in consequence of the inadmissbiity of self-opposition under G 9/93. Unlike the former EPC 1973, the revised EPC 2000 has a provision (Article 105a EPC) allowing for revoking one's own patent. Accordingly, a patent proprietor can request revocation of their own patent via that provision instead of opposing their own patents.

In addition to the revocation provision in Article 105a EPC, there also is a limitation procedure provided for in Article 105b EPC. Accordingly, patent proprietors cannot only have their patents revoked; they can also have the scope of their European patents limited post-grant.
