= G 2/06 =

G 2/06
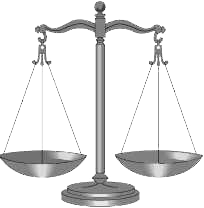

Enlarged Board of Appeal of the European Patent Office

Issued November 25, 2008
Board composition

Chairman: Peter Messerli
Members: S. Perryman, P. Alting van Geusau, U. Kinkeldey, M. Scuffi, J.-P. Seitz, O. Spineanu-Matel

Headword

Use of embryos/WARF

G 2/06 is a decision by the Enlarged Board of Appeal of the European Patent Office (EPO), which issued on 25 November 2008. In its answer to question 2, the Enlarged Board of Appeal ruled that "Rule 28(c) EPC (formerly [Rule 23d(c) EPC 1973]) forbids the patenting of claims directed to products which — as described in the application — at the filing date could be prepared exclusively by a method which necessarily involved the destruction of the human embryos from which the said products are derived, even if the said method is not part of the claims." In short, a patent under the European Patent Convention (EPC) cannot be granted for an invention that necessarily involves the use and destruction of human embryos. The decision notably refers to the provisions of EU Directive 98/44/EC of 6 July 1998 on the legal protection of biotechnological inventions, referred to in Rule 26(1) EPC.

The reactions to the decision were mixed. According to Reuters, the decision could stifle research by stem cell companies for commercial purposes. In contrast, according to the Guardian, "some experts believe this will provide a boost for European companies developing technologies based on human embryonic stem cells".
