= G 1/13 =

G 1/13
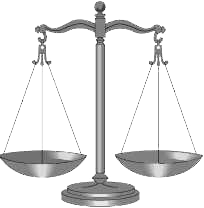

Enlarged Board of Appeal of the European Patent Office

Issued 25 November 2014
Board composition

Chairman: Wim Van der Eijk
Members: K. Garnett, A. Klein, R. Moufang, R. Murphy, U. Oswald, G. Weiss

Headword

Fischer-Tropsch Catalysts/SASOL TECHNOLOGY II

G 1/13 is a decision issued on 25 November 2014 by the Enlarged Board of Appeal of the European Patent Office (EPO), holding that in opposition proceedings a retroactive effect of a restoration of a company must be recognised by the EPO. In other words, a restoration of a company has retroactive effect before the EPO when it has such retroactive effect under national law.

== Questions referred to the Enlarged Board of Appeal ==
The referral to the Enlarged Board of Appeal lies from an interlocutory decision T 22/09 from Technical Board of Appeal 3.3.07. The referred questions were:

(1) Where an opposition is filed by a company which is dissolved before the Opposition Division issues a decision maintaining the opposed patent in amended form, but that company is subsequently restored to the register of companies under a provision of the national law governing the company, by virtue of which the company is deemed to have continued in existence as if it had not been dissolved, must the European Patent Office recognise the retroactive effect of that provision of national law and allow the opposition proceedings to be continued by the restored company?

(2) Where an appeal is filed in the name of the dissolved company against the decision maintaining the patent in amended form, and the restoration of the company to the register of companies, with retroactive effect as described in question 1, takes place after the filing of the appeal and after the expiry of the time limit for filing the appeal under Article 108 EPC, must the Board of Appeal treat the appeal as admissible?

(3) If either of questions 1 and 2 is answered in the negative, does that mean that the decision of the Opposition Division maintaining the opposed patent in amended form automatically ceases to have effect, with the result that the patent is to be maintained as granted?

== Answers to the referred questions ==
The Enlarged Board of Appeal answered these questions as follows:

(1) Where an opposition is filed by a company which subsequently, under the relevant national law governing the company, for all purposes ceases to exist, but that company is subsequently restored to existence under a provision of that governing national law, by virtue of which the company is deemed to have continued in existence as if it had not ceased to exist, all these events taking place before a decision of the Opposition Division maintaining the opposed patent in amended form becomes final, the European Patent Office must recognise the retroactive effect of that provision of national law and allow the opposition proceedings to be continued by the restored company.

(2) Where, in the factual circumstances underlying question (1), a valid appeal is filed in due time in the name of the non-existent opponent company against the decision maintaining the European patent in amended form, and the restoration of the company to existence, with retroactive effect as described in question 1, takes place after the expiry of the time limit for filing the notice of appeal under Article 108 EPC, the Board of Appeal must treat the appeal as admissible.

(3) Not applicable.
