= G 1/84 =

G 1/84

Enlarged Board of Appeal of the European Patent Office

Issued July 24, 1985
Board composition

Chairman: R. Singer
Members: P. Ford, O. Bossung, R. Kämpf, M. Prélot, G. Szabo, W. Oettinger

Headwords

Opposition by proprietor/ MOBIL OIL

G 1/84 is a decision of the Enlarged Board of Appeal of the European Patent Office (EPO), which was issued on July 24, 1985. The Board held in this decision that:

"A notice of opposition against a European patent is not inadmissible merely because it has been filed by the proprietor of that patent."

The decision was overruled in G 9/93, a later decision in which the Enlarged Board held that a European patent cannot be opposed by its own proprietor.
