= R 19/12 =

R 19/12

Enlarged Board of Appeal of the European Patent Office

ECLI:EP:BA:2014:R001912.20140425
Decision issued on April 25, 2014
Board composition

Chairman: B. Günzel
Members: R. Menapace, A. Ritzka

Headwords

Ablehnung wegen Besorgnis der Befangenheit (Recusal for suspicion of partiality)

R 19/12 is a decision issued on April 25, 2014 by the Enlarged Board of Appeal of the European Patent Office (EPO), in which the Enlarged Board allowed an objection of suspicion of partiality against its Chairman, the Vice-President of Directorate General 3 (DG3) (the Boards of Appeal Directorate), and ordered that he be replaced, because he was also acting as member of the Management Committee of the EPO. In 2014, the effects of the decision were said to be potentially far-reaching.

Following the decision, an organisational and structural reform of the EPO has been undertaken aiming at a clearer separation of the Boards of Appeal, i.e. the judiciary of the EPO, from its executive branch.

== See also ==
- Art. 23 1/15, Art. 23 2/15 and Art. 23 1/16, decisions relating to the suspension of a member of the EPO Boards of Appeal
- Wim van der Eijk, former Vice-President of the EPO, and head of the DG3 (Appeals), who was recused in R 19/12
- G 2/19, referral to the Enlarged Board of Appeal notably dealing with the proper location of the Boards of Appeal
