= G 2/98 =

G 2/98
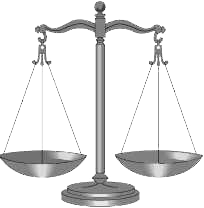

Enlarged Board of Appeal of the European Patent Office

Issued May 31, 2001
Board composition

Chairman: Peter Messerli
Members: W. Moser, C. Andries, G. Davies, J.-C. Saisset, R. Teschemacher, E. Turrin

Headwords

Requirement for claiming priority of the "same invention"

G 2/98 is an opinion of the Enlarged Board of Appeal of the European Patent Office (EPO) issued on May 31, 2001, after a point of law was referred to it by the President of the EPO (pursuant to Article 112(1)(b) EPC). The case pertains to the interpretation of the legal concept of "the same invention" in Article 87(1) EPC (i.e., a priority right claimed in a European patent application can only be enjoyed for "the same invention"). The Enlarged Board of Appeal in G 2/98 provided clarity to that concept. Namely, the Board held that

The requirement for claiming priority of "the same invention", referred to in Article 87(1) EPC, means that priority of a previous application in respect of a claim in a European patent application in accordance with Article 88 EPC is to be acknowledged only if the skilled person can derive the subject-matter of the claim directly and unambiguously, using common general knowledge, from the previous application as a whole.

In other words, the Board has ruled that a strict interpretation of ‘the same invention’ is appropriate.

== See also ==
- Amendments under the European Patent Convention
