= G 2/93 =

Case law in Europe

G 2/93
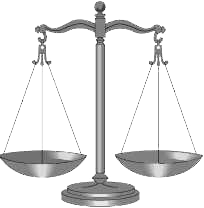

Enlarged Board of Appeal of the European Patent Office

Issued 21 December 1994
Board composition

Chairman: P. Gori
Members: G. Gall, K. Jahn, W. Moser, G.D. Paterson, J.-C. Saisset, P. van den Berg

Headword

Hepatitis A virus

G 2/93 is a decision issued on 21 December 1994 by the Enlarged Board of Appeal of the European Patent Office (EPO). The decision deals with deposits of biological material. More specifically, the decision deals with the time limit for the deposit of such material. The current provision in Rule 32(2)(a) EPC provides for a time limit of sixteen months from the date of filing or from the date of priority, whichever expires earlier.

== Question referred to the Enlarged Board of Appeal ==
The referral to the Enlarged Board of Appeal lies from an interlocutory decision T 815/90 from Technical Board of Appeal 3.3.2. The referred question is:

May the information concerning the file number of a culture deposit according to Rule 28(1)(c) EPC 1973 (now Rule 31(1)(c) EPC) be submitted after expiry of the time limit set out in Rule 28(2)(a) EPC 1973 (now Rule 32(2)(a) EPC)?

== Answer to the referred question ==
The Enlarged Board of Appeal answered this question as follows:

The information concerning the file number of a culture deposit according to Rule 28(1)(c) EPC 1973 (now Rule 31(1)(c) EPC) may not be submitted after expiry of the time limit set out in Rule 28(2)(a) EPC 1973 (now Rule 32(2)(a) EPC).
