= G 4/95 =

Case law in Europe

G 4/95
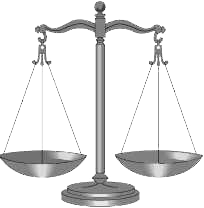

Enlarged Board of Appeal of the European Patent Office

ECLI:EP:BA:1996:G000495.19960219
Decision issued on 19 February 1996
Board composition

Chairman: P. Gori
Members: C. Andries, G. Gall, W. Moser, G.D. Paterson, R. Schulte, P. van den Berg

Headword

Representation/BOGASKY

G 4/95 is a decision issued on 19 February 1996 by the Enlarged Board of Appeal of the European Patent Office (EPO). The decision deals with oral submissions by an accompanying person in opposition or opposition appeal proceedings, and more specifically the extent and the circumstances under which an accompanying person or similar may add to the authorized representative's submissions during oral proceedings. The Enlarged Board of Appeal held that an accompanying person may be allowed to make oral submissions in relation to either legal or technical issues provided that the authorized representative maintains overall control at all times and "under the overall discretionary control of the EPO".

== Questions referred to the Enlarged Board of Appeal ==
The referral to the Enlarged Board of Appeal lies from an interlocutory decision T 803/93 from Technical Board of Appeal 3.4.1. The referred questions are:

(1) During oral proceedings before the EPO under Article 116 EPC, and in the context of opposition or opposition appeal proceedings, having regard to the provisions of Article 133 EPC, may a person who is not qualified in accordance with Article 134 EPC to represent parties to proceedings before the EPO, but who is accompanied by a person who is both qualified and authorised to represent a party to the proceedings, make oral submissions on behalf of that party on legal issues which arise in the case?

(2) During oral proceedings before the EPO under Article 116 EPC, and in the context of opposition or opposition appeal proceedings, having regard to the provisions of Article 117 EPC and Article 133 EPC, may a person who is not qualified in accordance with Article 134 EPC to represent parties to proceedings before the EPO, but who is accompanied by a person who is both qualified and authorised to represent a party to the proceedings, make oral submissions on behalf of that party on technical issues which arise in the case otherwise than by giving evidence orally in accordance with the provisions of Article 117(3) EPC 1973 (now Rule 118(1) EPC and Rule 118(2)(d) EPC)?

(3) In relation to each of questions (1) and (2) above taken separately:

(a) If the answer is "yes", can such oral submissions be made on behalf of the party as a matter of right, or can they be made with the permission of and under the discretion of the EPO?

(b) If such oral submissions can only be made under the discretion of the EPC, what criteria should be considered when exercising such discretion?

(c) Do special criteria apply to qualified patent lawyers of countries which are not contracting states to the EPC?

== Answers to the referred questions ==
The Enlarged Board of Appeal answered these questions as follows:

(1) and (2) During oral proceedings under Article 116 EPC in the context of opposition or opposition appeal proceedings, a person accompanying the professional representative of a party may be allowed to make oral submissions on specific legal or technical issues on behalf of that party, otherwise than under Article 117 EPC, in addition to the complete presentation of the party's case by the professional representative.

(3)(a) Such oral submissions cannot be made as a matter of right, but only with the permission of and under the discretion of the EPO.

(b) The following main criteria should be considered by the EPO when exercising its discretion to allow the making of oral submissions by an accompanying person in opposition or opposition appeal proceedings:

(i) The professional representative should request permission for such oral submissions to be made. The request should state the name and qualifications of the accompanying person, and should specify the subject-matter of the proposed oral submissions.

(ii) The request should be made sufficiently in advance of the oral proceedings so that all opposing parties are able properly to prepare themselves in relation to the proposed oral submissions.

(iii) A request which is made shortly before or at the oral proceedings should in the absence of exceptional circumstances be refused, unless each opposing party agrees to the making of the oral submissions requested.

(iv) The EPO should be satisfied that oral submissions by an accompanying person are made under the continuing responsibility and control of the professional representative.

(c) No special criteria apply to the making of oral submissions by qualified patent lawyers of countries which are not contracting states to the EPC.

== Practical aspects ==
Parties are advised to request oral submissions by an accompanying person in good time. If such submissions are requested shortly before inter partes proceedings, the request will normally be refused. It should be stressed that an accompanying person like a third person who is not party to the proceedings does not have a right to be heard.
