= Messerli =

Messerli is a surname. It means 'Little Knife' from the German 'messer' (knife) joined to 'li' (denoting little). It is a very common name in Switzerland, and also has many derivatives outside of Switzerland such as Messer and Messershmidt. Notable people with the surname include:

- Bruno Messerli (born 1931), Swiss professor of geography and author of The Himalayan Dilemma
- Douglas Messerli (born 1947), American poet, writer and publisher
- Peter Messerli, Swiss Vice-President of the European Patent Office until 2011
- Peter Messerli, Swiss professor of sustainable development, co-chair of UN Global Sustainable Development report, and Director of the Centre for Development and Environment
