= Restitutio in integrum under the European Patent Convention =

The restitutio in integrum or re-establishment of rights under the European Patent Convention (EPC) is a means of redress available to an applicant or patent proprietor who has failed to meet a time limit in spite of exercising "all due care required by the circumstances". The legal basis for this means of redress is provided in Article 122 EPC. If the request for restitutio in integrum is accepted, the applicant or patentee is re-established in its rights, as if the time limit had been duly met.

According to decision G 1/86 of the Enlarged Board of Appeal of the European Patent Office, other parties such as opponents are not barred from the restitutio in integrum by principle. For instance, if an opponent fails to file the statement of grounds for appeal in spite of all due care, after having duly filed the notice of appeal, restitutio remedies will be available to him or her.

== Legal basis and interpretation ==
The legal basis is provided in Article 122 EPC. Article 122(1) EPC reads:

"An applicant for or proprietor of a European patent who, in spite of all due care required by the circumstances having been taken, was unable to observe a time limit vis-à-vis the European Patent Office shall have his rights re-established upon request if the non-observance of this time limit has the direct consequence of causing the refusal of the European patent application or of a request, or the deeming of the application to have been withdrawn, or the revocation of the European patent, or the loss of any other right or means of redress."

Therefore, one of the conditions for re-establishment of rights to be possible is that:

"the applicant must have been unable to observe a time limit vis-à-vis the EPO. ... [The] word "unable" implies an objective fact or obstacle preventing the required action."

In relation to the "all due care" criterion, "an isolated mistake in a normally satisfactory system is excusable." An error may also be excusable if it resulted from exceptional circumstances.

If an applicant is represented by a professional representative, a request for re-establishment can only be allowed if the representative himself can show that he has taken all the "due care required by the circumstances" as well. Furthermore, if an applicant is represented both by a professional representative and a non-authorised representative, such as a non-European domestic representative, "the duty of due care applies to both of them."

== Procedure ==
Under Rule 136(4) EPC, "the department competent to decide on the omitted act shall decide on the request for re‑establishment of rights."

== See also ==
- Reformatio in peius
- Restitutio in integrum
