= Petition for review =

Formal request for a lower-court decision to be review

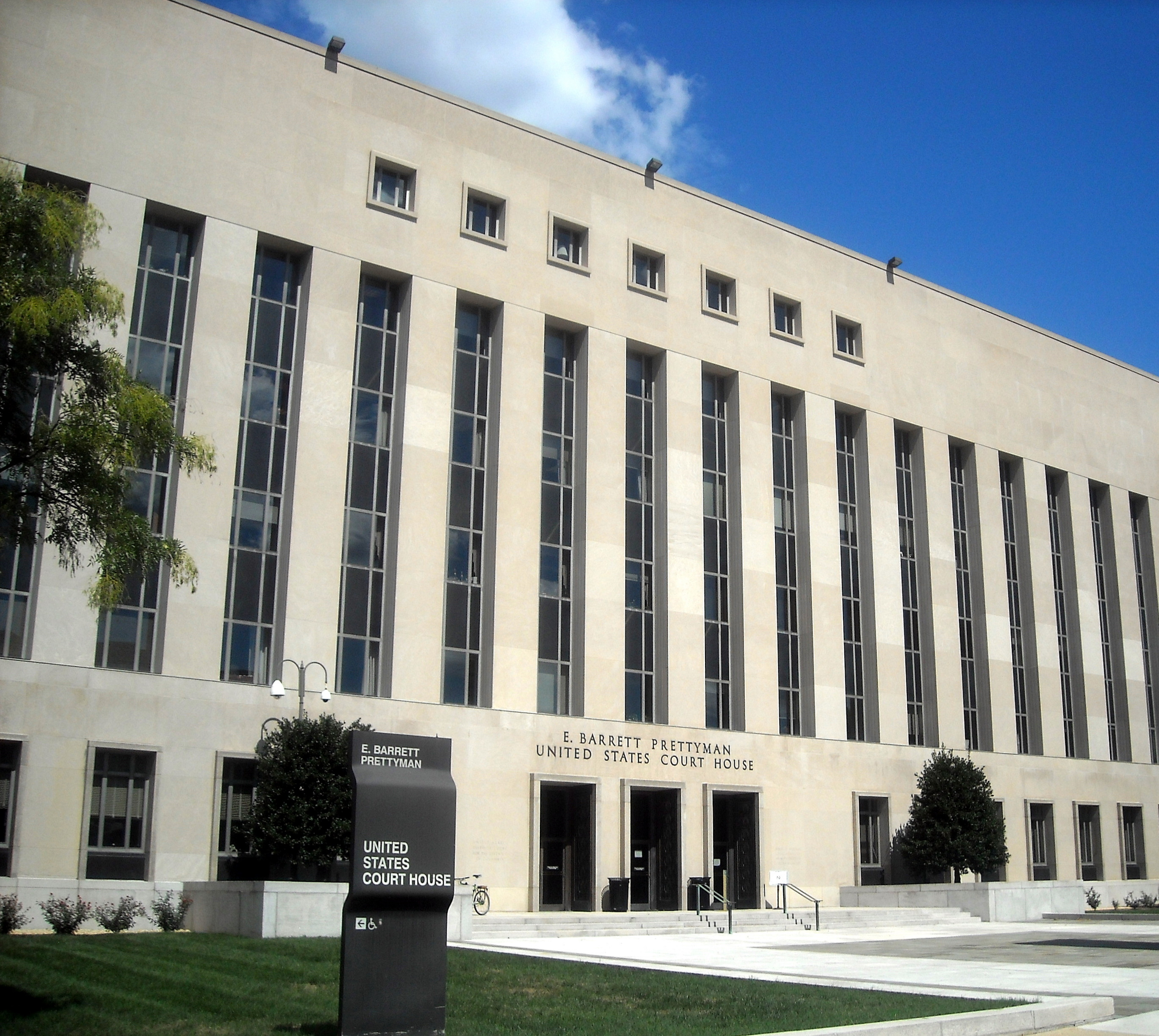
The E. Barrett Prettyman United States Courthouse is the home of the United States Court of Appeals for the District of Columbia Circuit, which decides a large number of petitions for review of actions taken by federal agencies.

In some jurisdictions, a petition for review is a formal request for an appellate tribunal to review the decision of a lower court or administrative body. If a jurisdiction utilizes petitions for review, then parties seeking appellate review of their case may submit a formal petition for review to an appropriate court. In United States federal courts, the term "petition for review" is also used to describe petitions that seek review of federal agency actions.

== Function of petitions for review in appellate procedure ==
In jurisdictions that utilize petitions for review, parties may file a petition in an appellate tribunal that asks the appellate tribunal to determine whether the previous court or tribunal reached the correct outcome. In some jurisdictions, appellate tribunals will not rule on issues that are not raised in petitions for review. Some courts also prohibit parties from filing other motions (such as a motion for summary judgment) when they file petitions for review. Because United States habeas corpus law requires petitioners for writs of habeas corpus to have exhausted state court remedies if they were convicted by a state court, habeas petitioners must first file a petition for review in the highest court in the state in which they were convicted, and raise all applicable issues, before filing a petition for writ of habeas corpus in federal court. However, in some cases, appellants may pursue issues on appeal by filing both a petition for review as well as a petition for writ of habeas corpus.

== Difference between petitions for review and petitions for certiorari ==
In the common law tradition, only the Court of Chancery had the power to grant prerogative writs that directed inferior tribunals to send a record of proceedings to a higher court for review. Beginning in the sixteenth century, the Court of King's Bench also gained the power to issue prerogative writs. Over time, the power to grant certiorari became the power to grant an order as "a means of controlling inferior courts and persons and bodies having authority to determine issues affecting the rights of individuals". However, writs of certiorari are traditionally only used when "the inferior body has acted without jurisdiction or determined an issue wrongly in law, but not on the ground that it had misconceived a point of law if it had jurisdiction and the proceedings are ex facie regular, nor on the ground that its decision is wrong in fact". In England, the Administrative Court (part of the Queen's Bench Division of the High Court of Justice) now issues "quashing orders" rather than writs of certiorari. In the United States, the Supreme Court of the United States grants writs of certiorari "to review questions of law or to correct errors or excesses by lower courts". However, some state courts in the United States require parties seeking appellate review to submit petitions for review, instead of petitions for certiorari, where the appellate tribunal grants an order that allows for review of the inferior tribunal's decision.

== Petitions for review of agency actions ==
In United States federal courts, parties may seek review or enforcement of federal agency order by filing a petition for review in a United States circuit court of appeals that has jurisdiction to review decisions from that agency. The court actions of enjoining, suspending and/or modifying the agency order is inherently part of a petition for review. When a party submits a petition for review, the petitioner "must either identify in [the administrative] record evidence sufficient to support its standing to seek review or, if there is none because standing was not an issue before the agency, submit additional evidence to the court of appeals". Once one party has filed a petition review, other parties may also file cross petitions for review, which also seek review of some or all of the issues decided by the lower court. The reviewing court may vacate the agency's actions, it may vacate the action and remand the case to the agency for "further action or explanation", it may remand the case without vacating the decision, or it may dismiss the petition for review.

== See also ==
- Appellate procedure in the United States
- Civil procedure
- List of legal topics
- Petition for review under the European Patent Convention
- Scope of review
