= Guidelines for Examination in the European Patent Office =

The Guidelines for Examination in the European Patent Office (or, for short, the EPO Guidelines) are general instructions, for the examiners working at the European Patent Office (EPO) as well as for the parties interacting with the EPO, (Note: Including the applicants, patentees, opponents, third parties, and their representatives.) on the practice and procedure at the EPO in the various aspects of the prosecution of European patent applications and European patents. The Guidelines have been adopted, effective as at 1 June 1978, by the President of the EPO in accordance with Article 10(2)(a) EPC.

== Structure ==
Since June 2012, the Guidelines comprise eight parts, relating respectively to the formalities examination (Part A), the search (Part B), the procedural aspects of substantive examination (Part C), the opposition and limitation/revocation procedures (Part D), general procedural matters (Part E), the European patent application (Part F), patentability (Part G), and the amendments and corrections (Part H).

== Revisions ==
The Guidelines are revised annually. Until 2019, the revised editions of the Guidelines were published annually on 1 November. No revised edition of the Guidelines was published in 2020, and, since then, the revised editions are published annually at the beginning of March.

== Legal status ==
According to several decisions of the Boards of Appeal of the EPO, the Guidelines are only general instructions intended to cover normal occurrences. An Examining Division (Note: The Examining Divisions are responsible for the examination of European patent applications, Article 18(1) EPC.), for example, can depart from them provided it acts in accordance with the European Patent Convention (EPC). "It [i]s normally desirable for examining divisions to act in accordance with the Guidelines, but (...) these [a]re not rules of law, so failure to follow a procedure set out in them [i]s not in itself a substantial procedural violation". Nevertheless, the users of the European patent system may reasonably expect, in accordance with the established "principle of the protection of legitimate expectations" (also referred to as "principle of good faith"), that the Guidelines will be followed by the departments of first instance of the EPO.

It is also settled case law that the Guidelines are not binding on the Boards of Appeal. This is "an important factor in the judicial independence of the boards of appeal" (Article 23(3) EPC).

== PCT-EPO Guidelines ==
Since 2015, separate guidelines, namely the "Guidelines for Search and Examination at the EPO as PCT authority", or "PCT-EPO Guidelines", are available to cover "the practice and procedure to be followed in various aspects of the handling of international applications before the EPO as International Searching Authority and International Preliminary Examining Authority." These Guidelines entered into force on 1 November 2015.

== See also ==
- Manual of Patent Examining Procedure (MPEP, United States)
- Manual of Patent Office Practice (MOPOP, Canada)
