= Observations by third parties under the European Patent Convention =

Concept in patent law

Under the European Patent Convention (EPC), any third party –i.e., essentially any person (Note: An actual party to the proceedings, such as an applicant, may not however file such observations, see Guidelines for Examination in the EPO, section e-vi, 3 : "Observations by third parties".)– may file observations on the patentability of an invention which is the subject of a European patent application or, after grant, subject of a European patent, (Note: This applies to European patents for which proceedings are pending before the EPO.) especially to draw the attention of the European Patent Office (EPO) to some relevant prior art documents. This is a form of public participation in the examination of patent applications.

== Procedure ==
Observations by third parties can only be filed after the publication of a European patent application. They must be filed in writing by post or, alternatively, online. The filing of observations by third parties at the EPO is free of charge and, according to the current practice of the EPO, may be anonymous. The observations must state the grounds on which they are based. The grounds must be written in one of the official languages of the EPO, i.e. in English, French or German. The documentary evidences (i.e., the publications, etc.) can be in any language, but the EPO may request a translation from the person filing the observations, if necessary. The observations are communicated to the applicant for or proprietor of the patent, who may comment on them.

If the observations call into question the patentability of the invention, they must be taken into account in any proceedings pending before a department of the EPO until such proceedings have been terminated, i.e. they must be admitted to the proceedings. The EPO "has a duty vis-à-vis the public not to grant or maintain patents which it is convinced are not legally valid".

== Status of the person submitting third party observations ==
A person submitting observations during examination or opposition proceedings does not become party to the proceedings. This notably means that, during examination proceedings, such person has no right to attend oral proceedings before the Examining Division, which are not public. This contrasts with the filing of a post-grant opposition, wherein the opponent becomes party to the proceedings, therefore acquiring, notably, the right to be heard before any decision is taken.

== Prioritization of treatment ==
The EPO announced that, as of July 2014, European patent applications for which "substantiated observations are filed by third parties who identify themselves" are to receive prioritized treatment. Third-party observations filed during the international phase may also lead to expediting the EPO examination proceedings, but only if the third party "has clearly expressed its wish that the next office action in the European phase be expedited".

== Statistics ==
Between 2006 and 2012, the number of third party observations submitted with the EPO roughly doubled. About 35 percent of cases against which third party observations are submitted are later opposed.
