= Patent law in Hong Kong =

The patent law in Hong Kong is based on the Hong Kong Patents Ordinance of 27 June 1997, as last amended on 22 February 2008. The Hong Kong patent system is independent from the patent system in the People's Republic of China (PRC), in that a "patent granted for Hong Kong SAR takes effect in Hong Kong only and does not provide for protection in the People's Republic of China (PRC)".

As of December 2019, three types of patents for inventions were available in Hong Kong, the "standard patent," the "short-term patent", and the "original grant patent":

- A standard patent in Hong Kong can be based on a European patent application designating the United Kingdom (UK), or a patent application in the PRC or the UK. When granted, the standard patent is independent from the original foreign patent (i.e., from the Chinese patent, the European patent, or the UK patent). However, if a standard patent is based on a European patent, and the European patent is amended or completely revoked following opposition proceedings before the European Patent Office, the proprietor of the standard patent shall notify the Hong Kong Registrar of Patents ("the Registrar") of the amendment or revocation. In the case of an amendment of the designated European patent, the Registrar shall record the amendment to the specification of the European patent by making an appropriate entry in the Hong Kong patent register and upon that recording the Hong Kong standard patent shall be treated as having been amended in a like manner. In the case of the revocation of the designated European patent, the Registrar shall record the filing, by the proprietor of the standard patent, of details of the revocation and advertise the fact by notice in the official journal. Upon the Registrar advertising details of the revocation of the European patent in the official journal, the Hong Kong standard patent shall be treated as never having had effect.
- Short-term patents are also available. Such patents have a maximum term of eight years from the filing date. The short-term patents are subject to a formality examination only, not to a substantive examination on the patentability of the invention.
- On 19 December 2019, a new patent system entered into force in Hong Kong. The new system introduces a so-called original grant patent (OGP) system for standard patents, allowing standard patent applications to be filed directly in Hong Kong without having to file a patent application outside Hong Kong. The first patent under the OGP system was granted in May of 2021, on a system relating to the use of artificial intelligence to manage inventory in an e-commerce system.
