= Reformatio in peius =

Legal concept

A reformatio in peius (Latin: "change for the worse") occurs in law when as the result of an appeal, the appellant is put in a worse position than if there had been no appeal. For example, an appellant in a criminal case might receive a more severe sentence on appeal than in their original trial.

Whether or not reformationes in peius are allowed depends on the jurisdiction and the applicable procedural law. In civil law jurisdictions, reformationes in peius are generally not allowed in appeals in administrative law cases and in criminal and civil appeals if the “other” party, i.e. the state in a criminal case, appeals the decision. Thus, a defendant needs never fear appeal an unjust conviction, such as a guilty verdict; a negative shift, such as a more severe penalty, can only result from the prosecution appealing it (as well).

== Prohibition at European Patent Office ==
Under the case law of the Boards of Appeal of the European Patent Office (EPO), a board cannot put a sole appellant in a worse position than if there had been no appeal of the first instance decision. In relation to appeals, the term "prohibition of reformatio in peius" thus essentially means that a person should not be placed in a worse position as a result of filing an appeal. Thus, in general, EPO Boards of Appeal are prevented in opposition appeal proceedings from going beyond the request of a sole appellant to put it in a worse position than before the appeal. The central case detailing the principle is G 4/93, consolidated with G 9/92.

The principle, however, has exceptions, as laid out for example in decision G 1/99. In that case, an error of judgement had been made by an Opposition Division in allowing the addition of a limiting feature going beyond the content of the application as filed (contrary to Article 123(2) EPC). The board allowed the patent proprietor to file requests to overcome the deficiency since

(...) it would be inequitable for the patent proprietor not to be given a fair opportunity to mitigate the consequences of errors of judgement made by the Opposition Division.

Still under the case law of the Boards of Appeal of the EPO, the doctrine of reformatio in peius does not, however, apply separately to each point or issue decided or to the reasoning leading to the impugned decision.

== See also ==
- Restitutio in integrum
