= Petition for review under the European Patent Convention =

Under the European Patent Convention (EPC), a petition for review is a request to the Enlarged Board of Appeal of the European Patent Office (EPO) to review a decision of a board of appeal. The procedure was introduced in Article 112a EPC when the EPC was revised in 2000, to form the so-called "EPC 2000". A petition for review can essentially only be based on a fundamental procedural defect. Its purpose is not to obtain a reconsideration of the application of substantive law, such as points relating to patentability. The petition is a restricted form of judicial review, limited to examining serious errors of procedure which might have been committed by the Legal or Technical Boards of Appeal, prejudicing the right to a fair hearing of one or more appellants. Before the entry into force of the EPC 2000 in December 2007, it was not possible for a party who did not have his requests granted in an appeal to challenge the final decision of the Legal or Technical Board of Appeal on any grounds.

== Requirements and effects ==
A party to appeal proceedings may file a petition for review. To do so, the party must however have been adversely affected by the Board of Appeal's decision. The prescribed contents of the petition for review is laid out in Rule 107 EPC. The petition must be filed with a time limit of 2 months from the notification of the Board of Appeal's decision, except when based on the grounds that a criminal act may have affected the decision of the Board of Appeal. In the later case, the petition must be filed "within two months of the date on which the criminal act has been established", but no later than five years after notification of the Board of Appeal's decision. Furthermore, a fee must be paid.

The review procedure has no suspensive effect on the Board of Appeal decision. If the petition is allowable, the Enlarged Board of Appeal sets aside the decision and re‑opens proceedings before the Boards of Appeal.

== Obligation to raise objections (Rule 106 objection) ==
Under Rule 106 EPC, "a petition under Article 112a(2)(a)–(d) is admissible only where an objection concerning the procedural defect was raised during the appeal proceedings and rejected by the Board of Appeal, unless such an objection could not have been raised at that time."

In other words, unless the grounds for an objection become apparent only from the Board’s written decision, failing to raise an objection under Rule 106 EPC at the earliest opportunity during the appeal proceedings may render a petition for review inadmissible. An objection under Rule 106 must be immediately recognizable by the Board of Appeal and it must be specific, i.e. "the party must indicate unambiguously which particular defect of those listed in paragraph 2(a) to (c) of Article 112a and Rule 104 EPC it intends to rely on".

== Grounds for review ==
There are five sets of grounds for review as laid out in Article 112a(1) EPC. The available grounds are strictly limited to these enumerated grounds.

The ground for review that a violation of Article 113 EPC occurred (violation of the right to be heard) is one of those most expected to be relied upon and, at the same time, it leaves much room for argument.

However, a procedural error marring the appeal proceedings does not, by itself, suffice to guarantee a successful petition. There must be a causal link between the alleged procedural defect and the damaging decision. Otherwise, the defect was not decisive and hence not fundamental.

== Procedure ==
The actual procedure for examination of the petitions for review involves two stages.

=== First stage: Rejection of clearly inadmissible or unallowable petitions ===
First, a three-member Enlarged Board decides whether the petition is clearly inadmissible or unallowable. If so, the petition is thrown out immediately. This first stage is "a quick screening process to be conducted by a three-member panel of the Enlarged Board in order to reject petitions which clearly cannot succeed." It is, in other words, a sifting process. To reject a petition as clearly inadmissible or unallowable, the three-member panel has to reach the decision unanimously. The decision is taken based only on what is in the petition, and the other party or parties, if any, are not involved and not invited to oral proceedings during that first stage. Most petitions are rejected during this first stage.

=== Second stage: Five-member examination ===
Secondly, if the petition is not rejected during the first stage, a five-member Enlarged Board examines the petition as to its merits. If the petition is allowable, the decision is set aside, the case is re-opened and sent back to the Board which took the reviewed decision, and the fee paid upon filing the petition for review is reimbursed to the successful petitioner. The Enlarged Board of Appeal has also the power to replace members of the Board of Appeal who took the reviewed decision.

== Statistics ==
The first petitions for review included R1/08 (application no 97600009), R2/08 (application no 00936978), R3/08 (application no 01943244) and R4/08 (application no 98116534). The first allowable petition for review was decision R 7/09, for a fundamental violation of Article 113 EPC.
