= Priority right =

Concept in patent and trademark law

In patent law, industrial design law, and trademark law, a priority right or right of priority is a time-limited right, triggered by the first filing of an application for a patent, an industrial design or a trademark respectively. The priority right allows the claimant to file a subsequent application in another country for the same invention, design, or trademark effective as of the date of filing the first application. When filing the subsequent application, the applicant must claim the priority of the first application in order to make use of the right of priority. The right of priority belongs to the applicant or his successor in title.

The period of priority, i.e., the period during which the priority right exists, is usually 6 months for industrial designs and trademarks and 12 months for patents and utility models. The period of priority is often referred to as the priority year for patents and utility models.

In patent law, when a priority is validly claimed, the date of filing of the first application, called the priority date, is considered to be the effective date of filing for the examination of novelty and inventive step or non-obviousness for the subsequent application claiming the priority of the first application. In other words, the prior art which is taken into account for examining the novelty and inventive step or non-obviousness of the invention claimed in the subsequent application would not be everything made available to the public before the filing date (of the subsequent application) but everything made available to the public before the priority date, i.e. the date of filing of the first application.

== Rationale ==
According to the European Patent Office, "basic purpose [of the right of priority] is to safeguard, for a limited period, the interests of a patent applicant in his endeavour to obtain international protection for his invention, thereby alleviating the negative consequences of the principle of territoriality in patent law."

== Types ==
=== Convention priority right ===
The "Paris Convention priority right", also called "Convention priority right" or "Union priority right", is a "priority right" under a multilateral arrangement, defined by Article 4 of the Paris Convention for the Protection of Industrial Property of 1883. The Convention priority right is probably the most widely known priority right. It is defined by its Article 4 A.(1):

Any person who has duly filed an application for a patent, or for the registration of a utility model, or of an industrial design, or of a trademark, in one of the countries of the Union, or his successor in title, shall enjoy, for the purpose of filing in the other countries, a right of priority during the periods hereinafter fixed.

Article 4 B. of the Paris Convention describes the effects of the priority right:

Consequently, any subsequent filing in any of the other countries of the Union before the expiration of the periods referred to above shall not be invalidated by reason of any acts accomplished in the interval, in particular, another filing, the publication or exploitation of the invention, the putting on sale of copies of the design, or the use of the mark, and such acts cannot give rise to any third–party right or any right of personal possession.

Article 2 paragraph 1 of the WTO Agreement on Trade-Related Aspects of Intellectual Property Rights (TRIPs Agreement) in conjunction with the Paris Convention provides a "derived" Convention priority right. That is, while WTO members need not ratify the Paris Convention, they should however comply with Articles 1 through 12, and Article 19, of the Paris Convention. (Note: For a comparative list of the States party to the Paris Convention and the members of the WTO, see for instance States Party to the PCT and the Paris Convention and Members of the World Trade Organization on the WIPO web site)

=== Priority rights under other multilateral arrangements ===
Some priority rights are defined by a multilateral convention such as the European Patent Convention (EPC) or the Patent Cooperation Treaty (PCT). The Paris Convention does not cover priorities claimed in a European patent application or in an international application (or PCT application), as the EPC and the PCT have their own legal provisions regarding priority.

==== European Patent Convention ====
Article 87(1) EPC defines the priority right system under the EPC or more precisely recognise priority rights for first filings in or for States party to the Paris Convention or any Member of the World Trade Organization (WTO):

Any person who has duly filed, in or for

(a) any State party to the Paris Convention for the Protection of Industrial Property or

(b) any Member of the World Trade Organization,

an application for a patent, a utility model or a utility certificate, or his successor in title, shall enjoy, for the purpose of filing a European patent application in respect of the same invention, a right of priority during a period of twelve months from the date of filing of the first application.

Article 89 EPC describes the effect of the priority right:

The right of priority shall have the effect that the date of priority shall count as the date of filing of the European patent application for the purposes of Article 54, paragraphs 2 and 3, and Article 60, paragraph 2.

As explained by the Enlarged Board of Appeal of the European Patent Office (EPO) in its decision G 3/93 of August 16, 1994 (Reasons 4):

Articles 87 to 89 EPC provide a complete, self-contained code of rules of law on the subject of claiming priority for the purpose of filing a European patent application (cf. decision J 15/80, OJ EPO 1981, 213). The Paris Convention also contains rules of law concerning priority. The Paris Convention is not formally binding upon the EPO. However, since the EPC - according to its Preamble - constitutes a special agreement within the meaning of Article 19 of the Paris Convention, the EPC is clearly intended not to contravene the basic principles concerning priority laid down in the Paris Convention (cf. decision T 301/87, OJ EPO 1990, 335, reasons point 7.5).

Regarding the critical question "What is 'the same invention'?" in Article 87(1) EPC, opinion G 2/98 prescribes a photographic approach to the assessment of priority. According to Enlarged Board of Appeal opinion G 2/98, the requirement for claiming priority of "the same invention" means that priority of a previous application in respect of a claim in a European patent application is to be acknowledged only if the skilled person can derive the subject-matter of the claim directly and unambiguously, using common general knowledge, from the previous application as a whole.

==== Patent Cooperation Treaty ====
The Patent Cooperation Treaty, in its Article 8(1), provides the possibility of claiming a right of priority for the filing of an international application (PCT application):

The international application may contain a declaration, as prescribed in the Regulations, claiming the priority of one or more earlier applications filed in or for any country party to the Paris Convention for the Protection of Industrial Property.

Rule 4.10(a) PCT goes on to mention that:

Any declaration referred to in Article 8(1) ("priority claim") may claim the priority of one or more earlier applications filed either in or for any country party to the Paris Convention for the Protection of Industrial Property or in or for any Member of the World Trade Organization that is not party to that Convention.

However, Rule 4.10(a) as amended with effect from January 1, 2000 does not apply to all designated Offices. For instance, for the European Patent Office as designated Office, the old Rule 4.10(a) still applied until December 12, 2007, that is, rights of priority of first applications made in a WTO member not party to the Paris Convention were not recognised. Now and more specifically for European patent applications filed on or after December 13, 2007 (the entry into force of the new version of the European Patent Convention, the so-called EPC 2000), the rights of priority of first applications made in a WTO member are recognized under the European Patent Convention.

=== Internal priority rights ===
Some priority rights, called "internal priority rights", are defined by some national laws. Such internal priority right allows an applicant who filed a first application in a given country to claim the priority of the first application when filing a subsequent application in the same country.

The Paris Convention does not cover internal priority rights. See, e.g., provisional application in the US.

=== Priority rights under bilateral agreements ===
Some priority rights also exist on the basis of bilateral agreements. A bilateral agreement between a first and a second country may allow an applicant who filed an application in the first country to claim the priority of the first application when filing a second application in the second country. These kinds of bilateral agreements usually involve at least one country not party to the Paris Convention.

== Special considerations ==
=== Partial priority for patent claims ===
The extent to which a partial priority can be acknowledged for a single claim in a patent application or patent -i.e., only for a part of the claim, for which the subject-matter is disclosed in the priority document- is a delicate question. Decision G 1/15 of the Enlarged Board of Appeal of the EPO deals specifically with this question.

=== Extension of the priority period in case of official holidays and other "closed" days ===
The Paris Convention for the Protection of Industrial Property of 1883 provides for that, if the last day of the 12-month priority period "is an official holiday, or a day when the Office is not open for the filing of applications in the country where protection is claimed", the priority period is extended "until the first following working day".

== See also ==
- WIPO DAS, a system for exchanging priority documents electronically
