= Carl Josefsson (judge) =

Swedish judge

Carl Josefsson (born 1965) is a former Swedish Judge at the Svea Court of Appeal in Stockholm, and currently President of the Boards of Appeal of the European Patent Office (EPO), a new position created within the EPO. He took up his new position on 1 March 2017 for a period of five years. As President of the Boards of Appeal of the EPO, Josefsson also acts as President of the Enlarged Board of Appeal.

Josefsson was appointed judge at the Svea Court of Appeal in 2013. From 1998 to 2013, he worked at the Swedish Ministry of Justice.

== See also ==
- Wim van der Eijk, head of the Boards of Appeal of the EPO and Chairman of the EPO Enlarged Board of Appeal until 1 December 2016

Positions in intergovernmental organisations
Preceded by Gunnar Eliasson (as acting Vice-President of the EPO, head of the DG 3 (Appeals))	President of the EPO Boards of Appeal (BoA); March 1, 2017–present	Incumbent
