= EPC 2000 =

The EPC 2000 or European Patent Convention 2000 is the version of the European Patent Convention (EPC) as revised by the Act Revising the Convention on the Grant of European Patents signed in Munich on November 29, 2000. On June 28, 2001, the Administrative Council of the European Patent Organisation adopted the final new text of the EPC 2000. The EPC 2000 entered into force on December 13, 2007.

The EPC 2000 does not introduce any major changes in substantive patent law, except changes concerning novelty, industrial applicability and priority rights. The EPC 2000 is however a comprehensive revision introducing "a considerable number of smaller amendments".

== Background ==
A diplomatic conference was held from 20 November to 29 November 2000 in Munich to revise the Convention on the Grant of European Patents of 5 October 1973, amongst other things to integrate in the EPC new developments in international law, especially those of the Agreement on Trade-Related Aspects of Intellectual Property Rights (TRIPs Agreement) and of the Patent Law Treaty, and to add a level of judicial review of the Boards of Appeal decisions.

== Entry into force ==
Greece deposited its instrument of ratification on December 13, 2005, and was the fifteenth Contracting State to ratify or accede to the EPC 2000. In addition, since not all the contracting states had deposited their instruments of ratification or accession by September 30, 2007, the EPC 2000 entered into force on December 13, 2007.

A Contracting State that would not have ratified or acceded to the EPC 2000 at the time of its entry into force, i.e. on December 13, 2007, would have ceased to be party to the EPC as from that time. All Contracting States ratified in due time.

== Amendments ==
=== Prior art effect and double patenting ===
Under the EPC 1973, in order to preclude double patenting, the prior art effect of a first European patent application (a so-called "conflicting patent application") filed before the filing date of a second European patent application, but published after said filing date, on the second application is limited to the designated states in common.

In the EPC 2000, this provision, i.e. Article 54(4) EPC, has been deleted. This means in the EPC 2000 that "any European application falling under Article 54(3) EPC constitutes prior art with effect for all the EPC contracting states at the time of its publication." Rule 23a EPC 1973 has been deleted following the deletion of Article 54(4).

The deleted Article 54(4) EPC remains applicable to the European patents granted before December 13, 2007 and the European patent applications pending on December 13, 2007. In other words, Art. 54(4) EPC 1973 is still transitionally applicable.

This amendment along with the absence of a transitional provision for Rule 23a (providing that Rule 23a EPC 1973 would continue to apply for pending applications or granted patents at the date of entry into force of the EPC 2000) has raised concerns that, "if the provisions of the EPC 2000 are interpreted strictly", patent rights existing at the date of entry into force of the EPC 2000 may become invalid after the entry into force of the EPC 2000, on December 13, 2007. In September 2007, the European Patent Office published a notice indicating that "the provisions currently laid down in Article 54(3) and (4) in conjunction with Rule 23a EPC 1973 will continue to apply to European patent applications filed and patents granted before the entry into force of the EPC 2000".

=== Requirements for obtaining a date of filing ===
The requirements to obtain a date of filing (for a European patent application), laid out in Article 80, have been amended. A reference is now made to the Implementing Regulations, which are now in line with "the worldwide standard laid out in Article 5 of the Patent Law Treaty 2000 (PLT)". In particular, Rule 40 EPC 2000 is relevant. There is no requirement anymore to file claims to obtain a date of filing. In addition the description may be filed in any language. Among the requirements, a reference to a previously filed application may also be used to obtain a date of filing. Furthermore, filing by reference to a previously filed application may incorporate the claims of the previously filed application.

From December 13, 2007 to December 19, 2008, "54 applications [have] been received with a later date of receipt of claims than the original application date. Sixty-one invitations to file claims have been prepared for other applications missing the date of receipt of claims. The possibility to replace descriptions and drawings with a reference to a previously filed application was used by applicants 391 times (usually for divisional applications) during the year following the entry into force of the EPC 2000, "accounting for 0.6 % of all direct European filings."

=== Priority rights extended to first filing in WTO members ===
The priority rights are extended to filing in or for any member of the World Trade Organization (WTO), in addition to any state party to the Paris Convention for the Protection of Industrial Property. This amendment has been made to align the European Patent Convention with Article 2 of the TRIPS Agreement.

=== Legal remedies ===
Extensive changes were also made to the possibilities for the legal remedy of the failure to observe various time limits within the European patent system. Most particularly, the failure to pay various fees (filing fee, designation fee, search fee and examination fee) were, until the coming into force of the EPC 2000, excluded from the standard legal remedies of further processing and re-establishment of rights. Under the EPC 1973, the failure to observe the time limits for paying these fees could only be remedied by strict grace periods. These grace periods have now been replaced by the application of further processing and, if the further processing time limit is missed, re-establishment of rights, which although not directly applicable to the time limit missed originally, is applicable to the failure to observe the time limit for further processing.

One of the biggest changes, was to allow the excuse of the failure to observe the 12 month priority period. If this period is missed, this failure can be remedied by a request for re-establishment of rights filed within 2 months of the expiry of the priority period (in most other cases, the request for re-establishment must be filed within two months of the removal of the impediment to completing the act in question on time, up to a maximum of 12 months). This is provided that the failure to observe the original period was despite the applicant having taken all due care (i.e. the applicant has a legitimate reason for missing the deadline). There is some uncertainty as to whether this is an aggregate time limit or a unitary time limit, which can make difference of up to several days as to when it expires.

=== Requests for limitation or revocation ===
Article 105a(1) EPC 2000 introduces a procedure for centrally limiting or revoking a European patent. A request for limitation or revocation may be filed at any time throughout the term of the European patent.

=== Petition for review ===
Article 112a EPC 2000 introduces a procedure for contesting the decisions of the boards of appeal by filing a petition for review. The petition for review can only be based on a fundamental procedural defect and its purpose is not to obtain a review of the application of substantive law. The petition is in fact a restricted form of judicial review, limited to examining serious errors of procedure which might have been committed by the Legal or Technical Boards of Appeal, prejudicing the right to a fair hearing of one or more appellants. Previously it was not possible for a party who did not have his requests granted in an appeal to challenge the final decision of the Legal or Technical Board of Appeal on any grounds.

The first petitions for review included R1/08 (application no 97600009), R2/08 (application no 00936978), R3/08 (application no 01943244) and R4/08 (application no 98116534). The first allowable petition for review was decision R 7/09, for a fundamental violation of Article 113 EPC.

== Transitional provisions ==
According to Article 7(1) of the Act revising the European Patent Convention of 29 November 2000,

The revised version of the Convention shall apply to all European patent applications filed after its entry into force, as well as to all patents granted in respect of such applications. It shall not apply to European patents already granted at the time of its entry into force, or to European patent applications pending at that time, unless otherwise decided by the Administrative Council of the European Patent Organisation.

Pursuant to Article 7(1) and (2) of the Act revising the EPC of 29 November 2000, the Administrative Council decided on 28 June 2001 to adopt a certain number of exceptions ("unless otherwise decided by the Administrative Council of the European Patent Organisation"). Amongst these exceptions (as laid out in Article 1.1 of the Administrative Council's decision of 28 June 2001), Articles 106 and 108 EPC are said to apply to all European patent applications pending at the time of the entry into force of the EPC 2000. However, the Legal Board of Appeal in case J 10/07 decided, in order to reflect the intention and purpose of those transitional provisions, to apply Articles 106 and 108 as applicable before the entry into force of the EPC 2000 (i.e. Articles 106 and 108 EPC 1973) to a pending European patent application.
