= Peter Messerli =

Peter Messerli was Vice-President of the European Patent Office (EPO) and head of the Boards of Appeal of the EPO known as DG3 (Directorate-General, 3, Appeals) from 1996 until his retirement at the end of November 2011.

He was head of the Patent Division at the Swiss Federal Institute for Intellectual Property before joining the EPO.

== Publications ==
- Peter Messerli, Resolving the conflict between discovery in American courts and the protection of secrecy under the laws of Switzerland, May 1, 1985, OCLC 22672046

Positions in intergovernmental organisations
Preceded by Paolo Gori	Vice-President of the European Patent Office, head of the DG 3 (Appeals); 1996-2011	Succeeded by Wim van der Eijk
