= Wim van der Eijk =

Wim van der Eijk (born ca. 1957) is a Dutch civil servant, who held the positions of Vice-President of the European Patent Office (EPO), head of the Boards of Appeal of the EPO, known as DG3 (Directorate-General, 3, Appeals), and Chairman of the EPO Enlarged Board of Appeal from December 2011 to November 2016. Previously, he held positions at the Netherlands Patent Office and in the Ministry of Economic Affairs of the Netherlands, he served as an honorary judge at the District Court of The Hague, and he was Principal Director of Patent Law and Multilateral Affairs at the EPO.

== See also ==
- Carl Josefsson, president of the EPO Boards of Appeal since March 1, 2017

Positions in intergovernmental organisations
Preceded by Peter Messerli	Vice-President of the European Patent Office, head of the DG 3 (Appeals); December 1, 2011–November 2016	Succeeded by Gunnar Eliasson (acting)
