= European Patent Convention =

International patent treaty

Convention on the Grant of European Patents
- European Patent Convention Contracting States in dark green, extension agreement states in light green and validation agreement states in blue
- Signed: 5 October 1973
- Location: Munich, Germany
- Effective: 7 October 1977
- Condition: Six states on whose territory the total number of patent applications filed in 1970 amounted to at least 180 000
- Signatories: 16
- Parties: 40
- Depositary: Government of the Federal Republic of Germany
- Languages: English, French and German

Full text
- Convention on the Grant of European Patents at Wikisource

The European Patent Convention (EPC), also known as the Convention on the Grant of European Patents of 5 October 1973, is a multilateral treaty instituting the European Patent Organisation and providing an autonomous legal system according to which European patents are granted.

A European patent is not a unitary right, but a bundle of essentially independent national patents, (Note: The view that a European patent issues as independent national patents in each designated Contracting state is very convenient from a practical point of view. Some however consider this view as incorrect: "The view that, after grant, a European patent breaks up into a bundle of national patents in designated Contracting States may appear plausible, but it is incorrect both in law and systematically", Singer/Stauder, The European Patent Convention, A Commentary, Munich, 2003, under Article 2. Singer/Stauder's view seems in turn rather theoretical in view of decisions Roche Nederland BV v Primus and GAT v LUK of the European Court of Justice (see also "Enforcement and validity" section), which reinforced the independent character of a European patent in each Contracting State. As Tom Scourfield wrote in an article commenting on these two decisions: "(...) a European patent is no more than a bundle of national patents pursuant to a single application. Until a true community patent becomes a reality it seems likely that true community enforcement will continue to elude patent owners." Tom Scourfield, Jurisdiction and Patents: ECJ rules on forum for validity and cross-border patent enforcement, The CIPA Journal, August 2006, Volume 35 No. 8, p. 535.) which are enforceable and revocable in each member state by the respective national authority. Nevertheless, a European patent may also be revoked or narrowed down as a whole through two types of unified, post-grant procedures: a time-limited opposition procedure, which can be initiated by any person except the patent proprietor, and limitation and revocation procedures, which can be initiated by the patent proprietor only.

The EPC provides a legal framework for the granting of European patents, via a single, harmonised procedure before the European Patent Office (EPO). A single patent application, in one language, may be filed at the EPO in Munich, at its branch in The Hague, (Note: The Hague branch of the EPO is actually located in Rijswijk.) at its sub-office in Berlin, or at a national patent office of a Contracting State, if the national law of the State so permits.

== History ==
In September 1949, French senator Henri Longchambon proposed to the Council of Europe the creation of a European Patent Office. His proposal, known as the "Longchambon plan", marked the beginning of the work on a European patent law aimed at a "European patent". His plan was however not found to be practicable by the Council's Committee of Experts in patent matters. The meetings of the Committee nevertheless led to two Conventions, one on the formalities required for patent applications (1953) and one on the international classification of patent (1954). The Council's Committee then carried on its work on substantive patent law, resulting in the signature of the Strasbourg Patent Convention in 1963.

In 1973, the Munich Diplomatic Conference for the setting up of a European System for the Grant of Patents took place and the Convention was then signed in Munich (the Convention is sometimes known as the "Munich Convention"). The signature of the Convention was the accomplishment of a decade-long discussion during which Kurt Haertel, considered by many as the father of the European Patent Organisation, and François Savignon played a decisive role.

The Convention was officially signed by 16 countries on 5 October 1973.

The Convention entered into force on 7 October 1977 for the following first countries: Belgium, Germany (then West Germany), France, Luxembourg, the Netherlands, Switzerland and the United Kingdom, and on 1 May 1978 for Sweden. However, the first patent applications were filed on 1 June 1978 (date fixed by the Administrative Council which held its first meeting on 19 October 1977). Subsequently, other countries have joined the EPC.

The EPC is separate from the European Union (EU), and its membership is different; Switzerland, Liechtenstein, Turkey, Monaco, Iceland, Norway, North Macedonia, San Marino, Albania, Serbia, the United Kingdom, Montenegro, and Moldova are party to the EPC but are not members of the EU. Further, the EU is not a party to the EPC, although all members of the EU are party to the EPC. The Convention is, as of June 2026, in force in 40 countries. Moldova became the 40th Contracting State on 1 June 2026.

A diplomatic conference was held in November 2000 in Munich to revise the Convention, amongst other things to integrate in the EPC new developments in international law and to add a level of judicial review of the Boards of Appeal decisions. The revised text, informally called the EPC 2000, entered into force on 13 December 2007.

=== Cooperation agreements with non-contracting states: extension and validation agreements ===
Contracting states and extension or validation states, in detail (with dates of entry into force)

Contracting States to the European Patent Convention, with respective date of entry into force
Date	States
7 October 1977	Belgium, Germany (then West Germany), France, (Note: The European Patent Convention (EPC) applies also to French overseas territories. See Synopsis of the territorial field of application of international patent treaties (situation on 1 March 2013), EPO OJ 4/2013, p. 269, footnote 4.); Luxembourg, Netherlands, (Note: The European Patent Convention was ratified on 7 October 1977 for the European Netherlands. From 4 April 2007, the EPC applied also to the Netherlands Antilles (presently Caribbean Netherlands, Curaçao and Sint Maarten). The Convention does not apply to Aruba. See Synopsis of the territorial field of application of international patent treaties (situation on 1 March 2013), EPO OJ 4/2013, p. 269, footnote 6, and Guidelines for Examination in the EPO, section foreword_6 "Contracting States to the EPC".) Switzerland, United Kingdom (Note: The European Patent Convention also applies to the Isle of Man. See Synopsis of the territorial field of application of international patent treaties (situation on 1 March 2013), EPO OJ 4/2013, p. 269, footnote 7. Furthermore, European patents in force in the UK can also be registered in the Crown dependencies and overseas territories Anguilla, Bermuda, British Virgin Islands, Cayman Islands, Falkland Islands, Gibraltar, Guernsey, Jersey, Montserrat and Turks and Caicos Islands, as well as the British Commonwealth countries Belize, Fiji, Grenada, Guyana, Kiribati, Solomon Islands and Tuvalu, generally within 3 years of grant of the European patent as explained in "Registration of European patents (UK) in crown dependencies, UK overseas territories and Commonwealth countries", OJ EPO 2018, A97. Finally, regarding registration of European patent applications and patents in the Hong Kong Special Administrative Region (SAR) is also possible, see "Patent protection in Hong Kong Special Administration Region", OJ EPO 2009, 546 and patent law in Hong Kong.)
1 May 1978	Sweden
1 December 1978	Italy
1 May 1979	Austria
1 April 1980	Liechtenstein
1 October 1986	Greece, Spain
1 January 1990	Denmark (Note: The European Patent Convention does not apply however to Greenland and the Faroe Islands. See Synopsis of the territorial field of application of international patent treaties (situation on 1 March 2013), EPO OJ 4/2013, p. 269, footnote 3.)
1 December 1991	Monaco
1 January 1992	Portugal
1 August 1992	Ireland
1 March 1996	Finland
1 April 1998	Cyprus
1 November 2000	Turkey
1 July 2002	Bulgaria, Czech Republic, Estonia, Slovakia
1 December 2002	Slovenia
1 January 2003	Hungary
1 March 2003	Romania
1 March 2004	Poland
1 November 2004	Iceland
1 December 2004	Lithuania
1 July 2005	Latvia
1 March 2007	Malta
1 January 2008	Norway, Croatia
1 January 2009	North Macedonia (then Republic of Macedonia)
1 July 2009	San Marino
1 May 2010	Albania
1 October 2010	Serbia
1 October 2022	Montenegro
1 June 2026	Moldova

States with an extension (E) or validation (V) agreement with the European Patent Office (EPO), with respective date of entry into force
Date	States
1 December 2004	Bosnia and Herzegovina (E)
1 March 2015	Morocco (V)
1 December 2017	Tunisia (V)
1 March 2018	Cambodia (V)
15 January 2024	Georgia (V)
1 April 2025	Laos (V)

States which had an extension (E) or validation (V) agreement with the EPO, and which are now Contracting States to the EPC
Period during which the agreement applied		States
From	To	States
1 March 1994	30 November 2002	Slovenia (E)
1 March 1994	31 December 2007	Croatia (E)
5 July 1994	30 November 2004	Lithuania (E)
1 May 1995	30 June 2005	Latvia (E)
1 February 1996	30 April 2010	Albania (E)
15 October 1996	28 February 2003	Romania (E)
1 November 1997	31 December 2008	North Macedonia (E) (then Republic of Macedonia)
1 November 2004	30 September 2010	Serbia (E)
1 March 2010	30 September 2022	Montenegro (E)
1 November 2015	31 May 2026	Moldova (V)

Throughout the history of the EPC, some non-contracting States have concluded cooperation agreements with the European Patent Organisation, known as extension or validation agreements. These states then became "extension states" or "validation states", which means that European patents granted by the EPO may be extended to those countries through the payment of additional fees and completion of certain formalities. Such cooperation agreements are concluded by the President of the European Patent Office on behalf of the European Patent Organisation pursuant to Article 33(4) EPC, are not based on a "direct application of the EPC but solely on national law modelled on the EPC", and exist to assist with the establishment of national property rights in these states. As is the case in EPO contracting states, the rights conferred to European patents validated/extended to these states are the same as national patents in those states. However, the extension of a European patent or patent application to these states is "not subject to the jurisdiction of the [EPO] boards of appeal."

As of April 2025, Bosnia and Herzegovina has an extension agreement with the EPO so that, in effect, this state can be designated in a European patent application. Several other "extension states" have since become states parties to the EPC. Furthermore, "validation agreements" with Morocco, Moldova, Tunisia, Cambodia, Georgia, and Laos are also in effect since 1 March 2015, 1 November 2015, 1 December 2017, 1 March 2018, 15 January 2024, and 1 April 2025 respectively.

== Legal nature and content ==
The European Patent Convention is "a special agreement within the meaning of Article 19 of the Convention for the Protection of Industrial Property, signed in Paris on 20 March 1883 and last revised on 14 July 1967, and a regional patent treaty within the meaning of Article 45, paragraph 1, of the Patent Cooperation Treaty of 19 June 1970." The European Patent Convention currently does not lead to the grant of centrally enforceable patents in all 39 countries, although the European Union patent would allow for unitary effect: centrally enforceability throughout 24 of the 27 countries of the European Union.

The content of the Convention includes several texts in addition to the main 178 articles. These additional texts, which are integral parts of the Convention, are:

- the "Implementing Regulations to the Convention on the Grant of European patents", commonly known as the "Implementing Regulations". The function of the Implementing Regulations is "to determine in more detail how the Articles should be applied". In case of conflict between the provisions of the EPC and those of the Implementing Regulations, the provisions of the EPC prevail.
- the "Protocol on Jurisdiction and the recognition of decisions in respect of the right to the grant of a European patent", commonly known as the "Protocol on Recognition". This protocol deals with the right to the grant of a European patent but exclusively applies to European patent applications.
- the "Protocol on Privileges and Immunities of the European Patent Organisation", commonly known as the "Protocol on Privileges and Immunities";
- the "Protocol on the Centralisation of the European Patent System and on its Introduction", commonly known as the "Protocol on Centralisation";
- the "Protocol on the Interpretation of Article 69 of the Convention";
- the "Protocol on the Staff Complement of the European Patent Office at The Hague", commonly known as the "Protocol on Staff Complement".

== Substantive patent law ==
One of the most important articles of the Convention, Article 52(1) EPC, entitled "Patentable inventions", states:

European patents shall be granted for any inventions, in all fields of technology, providing that they are new, involve an inventive step, and are susceptible of industrial application.

This article constitutes the "fundamental provision of the EPC which governs the patentability of inventions".

However, the EPC provides further indications on what is and is not patentable. Specifically, the EPC sets forth exclusions under Article 52(2) and (3) EPC and exclusions under Article 53 EPC.

First, discoveries, scientific theories, mathematical methods, aesthetic creations, schemes, rules and methods for performing mental acts, playing games or doing business, programs for computers and presentations of information are not regarded as inventions and are excluded from patentability only to the extent that the invention relates to those areas as such. This is "a negative, non-exhaustive list of what should not be regarded as an invention within the meaning of Article 52(1) EPC." (For further information, see also: Software patents under the EPC).

The second set of exclusions, or exceptions, include:

- Inventions contrary to "ordre public" or morality (Article 53(a) EPC),
- Plant or animal varieties and essentially biological processes for the production of plants and animals (Article 53(b) EPC), and
- Methods for treatment of the human or animal body by surgery or therapy, and diagnostic methods practised on the human or animal body (Article 53(c) EPC), which have been excluded for "socio-ethical considerations and considerations of public health". Products, "in particular substances or compositions", for use in any of these therapeutic or diagnostic methods are not excluded from patentability, however.

== Unified prosecution phase ==
The Convention also includes provisions setting out filing requirements of European applications, the procedure up to grant, the opposition procedure and other aspects relating to the prosecution of patent applications under the Convention.

European patent applications may be filed in any language, but they are prosecuted only in one of the three official languages of the EPO – English, French and German. If an application is filed in another language than an official language, a translation must be filed into one of the three official languages, within two months from the date of filing. The official language of filing (or of the translation) is adopted as the "language of proceedings" and is used by the EPO for communications.

European patent applications are prosecuted in a similar fashion to most patent systems – the invention is searched and published, and subsequently examined for compliance with the requirements of the EPC.

During the prosecution phase, a European patent is a single regional proceeding, and "the grant of a European patent may be requested for one or more of the Contracting States." All Contracting States are considered designated upon filing of a European patent application and paying the designation fee. Once granted by the EPO, a European patent comes into existence effectively as a group of national patents in each of the designated Contracting States.

== Opposition ==
There are only two types of centrally executed procedures after grant, the opposition procedure and the limitation and revocation procedures. The opposition procedure, governed by the EPC, allows third parties to file an opposition against a European patent within 9 months of the date of grant of that patent. It is a quasi-judicial process, subject to appeal, which can lead to maintenance, maintenance in amended form or revocation of a European patent. Simultaneously to the opposition, a European patent may be the subject of litigation at a national level (for example an infringement dispute). National courts may suspend such infringement proceedings pending outcome of the opposition proceedings to avoid proceedings running in parallel and the uncertainties that may arise from that.

== Grant, effect and need for translations ==
In contrast to the unified, regional character of a European patent application, the granted European patent does not comprise, in effect, any such unitary character, except for the opposition procedure. (Note: In addition to the opposition procedure and even after it has ended, particular acts can still be performed before the European Patent Office, such as requesting a rectification of an incorrect designation of inventor under Rule 19(1) EPC. "Rectification may [indeed] be requested after the proceedings before the EPO are terminated" (Guid. A III 5.6).) In other words, one European patent in one Contracting State (Note: There is no consistent usage of a particular expression to refer to "the European patent in a particular designated Contracting State for which it is granted". The article uses the expression "a European patent in a Contracting State" which is considered to be the most consistent with the authoritative text, i.e. the EPC.) is effectively independent of the same European patent in each other Contracting State, except for the opposition procedure and for the possibility to request unitary effect (a possibility existing since June 2023).

A European patent confers rights on its proprietor, in each Contracting State in respect of which it is granted, from the date of publication of the mention of its grant in the European Patent Bulletin. That is also the date of publication of the B1 document, i.e. the European patent specification. This means that the European patent is granted and confers rights in all its designated Contracting States at the date of mention of the grant, whether or not a prescribed translation is filed with a national patent office later on (though the right may later be deemed never to have existed in any particular State if a translation is not subsequently filed in time, as described below).

A translation of a granted European patent must be filed in some EPC Contracting States to avoid loss of right. Namely, in the Contracting States which have "prescribe[d] that if the text, in which the European Patent Office intends to grant a European patent (...) is not drawn up in one of its official languages, the applicant for or proprietor of the patent shall supply to its central industrial property office a translation of this text in one of its official languages at his option or, where that State has prescribed the use of one specific official language, in that language". The European patent is void ab initio in a designated Contracting State where the required translation (if required) is not filed within the prescribed time limit after grant. In other Contracting States, no translation needs to be filed, for example in Ireland if the European patent is in English. In those Contracting States where the London Agreement is in force the requirement to file a translation of the European patent has been entirely or partially waived. If a translation is required, a fee covering the publication of said translation may be due as well.

=== European patent with unitary effect ===
Since June 2023, unitary effect may be requested for a granted European patent. The European patent with unitary effect, also known as the unitary patent, is a European patent which benefits from unitary effect in the participating member states of the European Union. Unitary effect means the patent has a common legal status throughout all the participating states, eliminating scenarios in which a patent may be invalidated by courts in one participating member state yet upheld by courts in another. Infringement and revocation proceedings relating to unitary patents are conducted before the Unified Patent Court (UPC).

== Enforcement and validity ==
Almost all attributes of a European patent in a Contracting State, i.e. ownership, validity, and infringement, are determined independently under respective national law, except for the opposition procedure, limitation procedure, and revocation procedure as discussed above. Though the EPC imposes some common limits, the EPC expressly adopts national law for interpretation of all substantive attributes of a European patent in a Contracting State, with a few exceptions. However, since June 2023, non-opted-out nationally-validated European patents and unitary patents are subject to the jurisdiction of the Unified Patent Court (UPC).

=== Infringement ===
Infringement is remitted entirely to national law and to national courts and to the UPC, if competent. In one of its very few substantive interventions into national law, the EPC requires that national courts must consider the "direct product of a patented process" to be an infringement. The "extent of the protection" conferred by a European patent is determined primarily by reference to the claims of the European patent (rather than by the disclosure of the specification and drawings, as in some older patent systems), though the description and drawings are to be used as interpretive aids in determining the meaning of the claims. A "Protocol on the Interpretation of Article 69 EPC" provides further guidance, that claims are to be construed using a "fair" middle position, neither "strict, literal" nor as mere guidelines to considering the description and drawings, though of course even the protocol is subject to national interpretation. The authentic text of a European patent application and of a European patent are the documents in the language of the proceedings.

All other substantive rights attached to a European patent in a Contracting State, such as what acts constitute infringement (indirect and divided infringement, infringement by equivalents, extraterritorial infringement, infringement outside the term of the patent with economic effect during the term of the patent, infringement of product claims by processes for making or using, exports, assembly of parts into an infringing whole, etc.), the effect of prosecution history on interpretation of the claims, remedies for infringement or bad faith enforcement (injunction, damages, attorney fees, other civil penalties for wilful infringement, etc.), equitable defences, coexistence of an EP national daughter and a national patent for identical subject matter, ownership and assignment, extensions to patent term for regulatory approval, etc., are expressly remitted to national law.

For a period in the late-1990s, national courts issued cross-border injunctions covering all EP jurisdictions, but this has been limited by the European Court of Justice. In two cases in July 2006 interpreting Articles 6.1 and 16.4 of the Brussels Convention, the European Court of Justice held that European patents are national rights that must be enforced nationally, that it was "unavoidable" that infringements of the same European patent have to be litigated in each relevant national court, even if the lawsuit is against the same group of companies, and that cross-border injunctions are not available.

=== Validity ===
Validity is also remitted largely to national law, national courts, and the UPC, if competent. Article 138(1) EPC limits the application of national law to only the following grounds of invalidity, and specifies that the standards for each ground are those of national law:

- if the subject-matter of the European patent is not patentable within the terms of Articles 52 to 57 EPC (see "Substantive patent law" section above);
- if the disclosure does not permit the invention to be carried out by a person skilled in the art;
- if amendments have been made such that the subject-matter extends beyond the content of the application as filed;
- if the claims have been broadened post-grant, e.g. in opposition proceedings;
- an improper proprietor—in some jurisdictions, only the person pretending to be entitled to the European patent can raise this specific ground, so that the resulting nullity of the patent may be relative to some persons only.

== Term (duration) of a European patent ==
The EPC requires all jurisdictions to give a European patent a term of 20 years from the filing date, the filing date being the actual date of filing an application for a European patent or the date of filing of an international application under the PCT designating the EPO. The filing date is not necessarily the priority date, which can be up to one year earlier. (Note: In rare cases, the filing date can be even more than one year after the priority date if the applicant missed the priority year and successfully obtained a re-establishment of rights in respect of the priority period. See Guidelines for Examination in the EPO, section f-vi, 3.6 .) The term of a granted European patent may be extended under national law if national law provides term extension to compensate for pre-marketing regulatory approval. For EEA member states this is by means of a supplementary protection certificate (SPC).

== Relation with the Patent Cooperation Treaty ==
A European patent application may result from the filing of an international application under the Patent Cooperation Treaty (PCT), i.e. the filing of a PCT application, and then the entry into "European regional phase", i.e. the transition from the international to the European procedural stages. The European patent application is therefore said to be a "Euro-PCT application" and the EPO is said to act as a designated or elected Office. In case of conflict between the provisions of the EPC and those of the PCT, the provisions of the PCT and its Regulations prevail over those of the EPC.

Twelve EPC Contracting States, namely Belgium, Cyprus, France, Greece, Ireland, Latvia, Malta, Monaco, Montenegro, the Netherlands, San Marino, and Slovenia, have "closed their national route". This means that, for these countries, it is not possible to obtain a national patent through the international (PCT) phase without entering into the regional European phase and obtaining a European patent. The "national route" for Italy was closed until 30 June 2020, but Italy then reopened it for PCT applications filed on or after 1 July 2020.

== See also ==
- Glossary of patent law terms
- Vienna Convention on the Law of Treaties (1969)
