= Appeal procedure before the European Patent Office =

The European Patent Convention (EPC), the multilateral treaty instituting the legal system according to which European patents are granted, contains provisions allowing a party to appeal a decision issued by a first instance department of the European Patent Office (EPO). For instance, a decision of an Examining Division refusing to grant a European patent application may be appealed by the applicant. The appeal procedure before the European Patent Office is under the responsibility of its Boards of Appeal, which are institutionally independent within the EPO.

== Overview ==
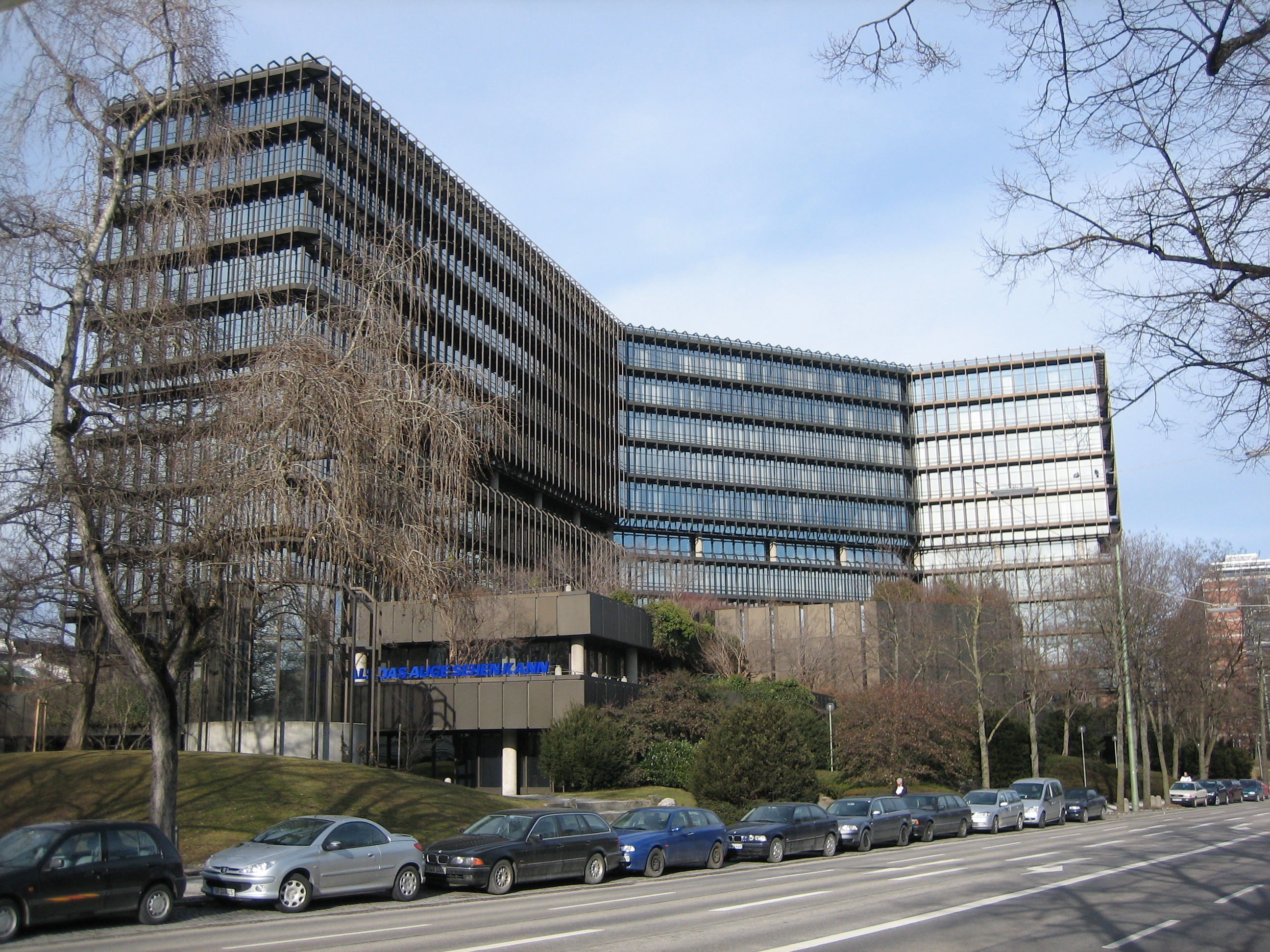
EPO headquarters in Munich, Germany, where the Boards of Appeal were based until 2017.

Decisions of the first instance departments of the European Patent Office (EPO) can be appealed, i.e. challenged, before the Boards of Appeal of the EPO, in a judicial procedure (proper to an administrative court), as opposed to an administrative procedure. These boards act as the final instances in the granting and opposition procedures before the EPO. The Boards of Appeal have been recognised as courts, or tribunals, of an international organisation, the EPO.

The Boards of Appeal of the EPO, including the Enlarged Board of Appeal, were until 2017 based at the headquarters of the EPO in Munich, Germany. In October 2017, the Boards of Appeal moved to Haar, a municipality located 12 km east of Munich's city centre. In contrast to the Boards of Appeal, the Examining Divisions and Opposition Divisions, i.e. the first instance departments carrying the examination of patent applications and of oppositions to granted European patents, are not all based in a single location; those may be in Munich, in Rijswijk (a suburb of The Hague, Netherlands), or in Berlin, Germany.

=== Enlarged Board of Appeal ===
In addition to the Boards of Appeal, i.e. the Technical Boards of Appeal (TBA), the Legal Board of Appeal, and the Disciplinary Board of Appeal, the European Patent Office also has an "Enlarged Board of Appeal" (sometimes abbreviated "EBoA" or "EBA"). The Enlarged Board of Appeal does not constitute an additional level of jurisdiction in the classical sense. It is fundamentally a legal instance in charge of deciding on points of law, and has the four following functions.

The first two functions of the Enlarged Board of Appeal are to make decisions or to issue opinions when the case law of the Boards of Appeal becomes inconsistent or when an important point of law arises, either upon a referral from a Board of Appeal (first function of the Enlarged Board of Appeal), in which case the Enlarged Board issues a decision, or upon a referral from the President of the EPO (second function of the Enlarged Board of Appeal), in which case the Enlarged Board issues an opinion. Its purpose is to ensure uniform application of the European Patent Convention and to clarify or interpret important points of law in relation to the European Patent Convention. When fulfilling these two functions, the Enlarged Board of Appeal is composed of seven members, five legally qualified members and two technical members. The referral of a question of law by a Board of Appeal to the Enlarged Board of Appeal is fairly similar to a referral by a national court to the European Court of Justice.

The third function of the Enlarged Board of Appeal is to examine petitions for review of decisions of the Boards of Appeal. The third function is relatively recent. It is indeed only since December 2007 and the entry into force of the EPC 2000, the revised European Patent Convention, that a petition for review of a decision of a Board may be filed, albeit on limited grounds.

The fourth function is to propose the removal from office of a member of the boards of appeal. Under Article 23(1) EPC, a member of the Enlarged Board or of a Board of Appeal may not be removed from office during the five-year term of appointment, other than on serious grounds and if the "Administrative Council, on a proposal from the Enlarged Board of Appeal, takes a decision to this effect." The Enlarged Board has been requested on three occasions to propose the removal from office of the same Board member, but did so in none of these cases.

=== Organisational structure, and supervision ===
The Boards of Appeal, the Enlarged Board of Appeal, as well as their registries and support services, form a separate unit within the European Patent Office, the so-called "Boards of Appeal Unit". It is directed by the President of the Boards of Appeal, a position held as of 2018 by former Swedish Judge Carl Josefsson. The President of the Boards of Appeal is also the chairperson of the Enlarged Board of Appeal. The "Presidium of the Boards of Appeal" is the autonomous authority within the Boards of Appeal Unit, and consists of the President of the Boards of Appeal and twelve members of the Boards of Appeal, elected by their peers.

Furthermore, a "Boards of Appeal Committee" has been set up by the Administrative Council of the European Patent Organisation to adopt the Rules of Procedure of the Boards of Appeal (and of the Enlarged Board of Appeal), and to assist the Administrative Council in supervising the Boards of Appeal. The Boards of Appeal Committee consists of six members, three of whom are members of the Administrative Council itself (i.e. representatives of the Contracting States within the meaning of Article 26 EPC) and the remaining three are "serving or former judges of international or European courts or of national courts of the Contracting States".

The current organisational and managerial structure of the Boards of Appeal resulted from a reform undertaken by the Administrative Council as a reaction to Enlarged Board of Appeal decision R 19/12 of 25 April 2014. The reform was undertaken by the Administrative Council "within the existing framework of the European Patent Convention, without requiring its revision." (Note: A revision of the European Patent Convention necessitates a Conference of the Contracting States, see Article 172 EPC.)

== Procedure ==
An appeal may be filed against a decision of a first instance department of the EPO, i.e. a decision of the Receiving Section, of an Examining Division, of an Opposition Division or of the Legal Division. The Boards of Appeal are not competent, however, to review decisions taken by the EPO acting as international authority under the Patent Cooperation Treaty. Most appeals are filed (i.e., lodged) against decisions of Examining Divisions and Opposition Divisions, with a relatively small number of cases being appeals against decisions of the Receiving Section and Legal Division. An appeal has a suspensive effect, which means that, for example, "[i]n the case of a refusal of an application, the filing of an appeal will have the effect of suspending the effect of the order refusing the application". The provisions applicable to the first instance proceedings from which the appeal derives also apply during appeal proceedings, "[u]nless otherwise provided."

=== Possible interlocutory revision in ex parte proceedings ===
If an appeal is lodged against a decision in ex parte proceedings (i.e., proceedings where the appellant is not opposed to another party) and if the first instance department that took the decision regards the appeal to be admissible and well founded, it has to rectify its decision. This is called an "interlocutory revision", which is said to be a rather unusual procedure within the EPO. Nonetheless, this is a very useful procedure, for procedural expediency and economy, for example if amendments are filed with the appeal, which clearly overcome the objections in the first instance decision. If the appeal is not allowed by the first instance department within three months of receipt of the statement of grounds, the first instance department has to transfer the case to the Board of Appeal without delay, and without comment as to its merit.

In the event of an interlocutory revision, the appeal fee is reimbursed in full "if such reimbursement is equitable by reason of a substantial procedural violation". Whether the appeal fee is to be reimbursed in the event of an interlocutory revision must be examined "regardless of whether or not the appellant has actually submitted" a request for reimbursement of the appeal fee. If the first instance department decides to grant the interlocutory revision but not a request of the appellant for reimbursement of the appeal fee, the first instance department has to remit "the request of the appellant for reimbursement of the appeal fee to a board of appeal". In other words, in such a case, the first instance department "is not competent to refuse a request of the appellant for reimbursement of the appeal fee." Instead, a Board is competent to decide on the request.

=== Examination of the admissibility of the appeal ===
For an appeal to be admissible, amongst other requirements, notice of appeal must be filed at the EPO within two months of notification of the contested decision, and the fee for appeal must be paid. In addition, within four months of notification of the decision, a statement setting out the grounds of appeal (i.e., the appeal grounds) must be filed, which shall contain the appellant's complete case. The appellant must also be adversely affected by the appealed decision. A party is only adversely affected by an appealed decision if the order of the appealed decision does not comply with its request (i.e., what the party requested during the first instance proceedings). For instance, when "the order of the decision of the opposition division is the revocation of the patent, an opponent who requested revocation of the patent in its entirety is not "adversely affected by" said decision... irrespective of the reasons given in the decision."

The admissibility of an appeal may be assessed at every stage of the appeal proceedings. Furthermore, the requirements for admissibility must not only be satisfied when lodging the appeal, they must be sustained throughout the duration of the appeal proceedings.

=== Examination of the merits of the appeal ===
If the appeal is found to be admissible, (Note: A Board may also choose to leave open the question of admissibility of the appeal if none of the appellant's requests are considered to be allowable. An example of such a case is T 255/22.) the Board of Appeal examines whether the appeal is allowable, i.e. the Board addresses the merits of the case. When doing so, "the boards have competence to review appealed decisions in full, including points of law and fact".

In that context, if the first instance department exercised its discretion (pursuant to Article 114(2) EPC) to admit facts or evidence which were not submitted in due time by a party, the Board "should only overrule such a decision, if it concludes that the department that took it applied the wrong principles, took no account of the right principles, or exercised its discretion in an unreasonable way, thus exceeding the proper limits of its discretion".

=== Optional remittal ===
After examining the allowability of an appeal, a Board has the discretion to either "exercise any power within the competence of the department which was responsible for the decision appealed" (correction of a decision) or "remit the case to that department for further prosecution" (cassation of a decision). When a board remits a case to the first instance, it does so notably to give the parties the possibility of defending their case before two instances, i.e. at two levels of jurisdiction, although there is no absolute right to have an issue decided upon by two instances. The boards generally take into account as well the need for procedural efficiency when deciding whether to remit a case to the first instance and "the general interest that proceedings are brought to a close within an appropriate period of time".

=== Accelerated processing ===
Appeal proceedings conducted at the EPO may be accelerated "by giving a case priority over others". A party to the proceedings may request accelerated processing of the appeal proceedings. The request must be reasoned. The Board has the discretion to grant or refuse the request. Courts, competent authorities of the contracting states, and the Unified Patent Court (UPC) may also request acceleration of proceedings relating to a specific patent, without providing a specific reason. The Board may also decide to accelerate the proceedings of its own motion.

=== Oral proceedings ===
During appeal proceedings, oral proceedings may take place at the request of the EPO or at the request of any party to the proceedings, i.e. the applicant (who is, in pre-grant appeal, the appellant), or the patentee or an opponent (who are, in opposition appeal, (Note: A patentee may also be the sole appellant in an ex parte appeal proceedings following a decision of an Examining Division in limitation and revocation proceedings. Decisions of an Examining Division in such proceedings are open to appeal (OJ 2007, Special edition 4/2007, page 118, item 6, and Articles 106(1) and 21 EPC).) appellant and/or respondent). The oral proceedings in appeal are held in Haar or Munich, and are public unless very particular circumstances apply. This contrasts with oral proceedings held before an Examining Division, which are not public. The list of public oral proceedings in appeal is available on the EPO web site. The right to oral proceedings is a specific and codified part of the procedural right to be heard. Oral proceedings may also be held by videoconference.

To prepare the oral proceedings, the Board shall "issue a communication drawing attention to matters that seem to be of particular significance for the decision to be taken". Together with such a communication, "[t]he Board may also provide a preliminary opinion" on the merits of the case. A decision may be, and often is, announced at the end of the oral proceedings, since the purpose of oral proceedings is to come to a conclusion on a case.

=== Substantial procedural violation and reimbursement of the appeal fee ===
The EPC provides that, if the Board of Appeal finds out that a substantial procedural violation took place during the first instance proceedings and if the Board considers the appeal to be allowable, the appeal fee shall be reimbursed if such reimbursement is equitable.

A substantial procedural violation may for instance occur during the first instance proceedings if the right of the parties to be heard were violated (Article 113(1) EPC) or if the first instance decision was not properly reasoned (Rule 111(2) EPC). To be properly reasoned, "a decision must contain, in logical sequence, those arguments which justify its order" "so as to enable the parties and, in case of an appeal, the board of appeal to examine whether the decision was justified or not".

More generally, a substantial procedural violation is "an objective deficiency affecting the entire proceedings". The expression "substantial procedural violation" is to be understood, in principle, as meaning "that the rules of procedure have not been applied in the manner prescribed by the [European Patent] Convention."

=== Full or partial reimbursement of the appeal fee upon withdrawal of the appeal ===
The appeal fee is reimbursed in full "if the appeal is withdrawn before the filing of the statement of grounds of appeal and before the period for filing that statement has expired." Besides, the appeal fee is partially reimbursed, at a rate of 75%, 50%, or 25%, if the appeal is withdrawn at certain stages of the appeal proceedings. The withdrawal of an appeal must be explicit and unambiguous.

== Binding character of decisions ==
The legal system established under the EPC differs from a common law legal system in that "[it] does not treat (...) established jurisprudence as binding." Under the EPC, there is no principle of binding case law. That is, the binding effect of board of appeal decisions is extremely limited.

A decision of a Board of Appeal is only binding on to the department whose decision was appealed, insofar as the facts are the same (if the case is remitted to the first instance of course). However, "[if] the decision which was appealed emanated from the Receiving Section, the Examining Division shall similarly be bound by the ratio decidendi of the Board of Appeal." However, if "a Board consider[s] it necessary to deviate from an interpretation or explanation of the [EPC] given in an earlier decision of any Board, the grounds for this deviation shall be given, unless such grounds are in accordance with an earlier decision or opinion of the Enlarged Board of Appeal (...)."

A decision of the Enlarged Board of Appeal (pursuant to Article 112(1)(a) EPC) is only binding on the Board of Appeal in respect of the appeal in question, i.e. on the Board of Appeal that referred the question to the Enlarged Board of Appeal. Furthermore, in the event that a Board considers it necessary to deviate from an opinion or decision of the Enlarged Board of Appeal, a question must be referred to the Enlarged Board of Appeal.

Outside the European Patent Office, the decisions of the Boards of Appeal are not strictly binding on national courts, but they certainly have a persuasive authority.

=== Correction of a Board's decision under Rule 140 EPC ===
Under Rule 140 EPC, "only linguistic errors, errors of transcription and obvious mistakes may be corrected" in decisions of the EPO. This possibility to correct a decision is also available for decisions of the EPO Boards of Appeal. (Note: See for example decision T 17/22 of 20 September 2022, which was followed by a decision of 23 September 2022 correcting an error in the decision of 20 September 2022.)

== Independence of the members of the Boards of Appeal ==
The members of the Boards of Appeal and of the Enlarged Board of Appeal are appointed by the Administrative Council of the European Patent Organisation on a proposal from the President of the European Patent Office. Moreover, during their five-year term, the Board members may only be removed from office under exceptional circumstances.

According to Sir Robin Jacob, the members of the Boards of Appeal are "judges in all but name". They are only bound by the European Patent Convention. They are not bound by any instructions, such as the "Guidelines for Examination in the European Patent Office". They have a duty of independence.

However, since "the [appeal] boards' administrative and organisational attachment to the EPO which is an administrative authority obscures their judicial nature and is not fully commensurate with their function as a judicial body", there have been calls for creating, within the European Patent Organisation, a third judicial body alongside the Administrative Council and the European Patent Office. This third judicial body would replace the present Boards of Appeal and could be called the "Court of Appeals of the European Patent Organisation" or the "European Court of Patent Appeals". This third body would have its own budget, would have its seat in Munich, Germany and would be supervised "without prejudice to its judicial independence" by the Administrative Council of the EPO. The EPO has also proposed that the members of the Boards of Appeal should be appointed for lifetime, "with grounds for termination exhaustively regulated in the EPC". These changes would however need to be approved by a new Diplomatic Conference.

According to some experts, the calls to improve the institutional independence of the Boards of Appeal have not received so far the appropriate consideration by the Administrative Council of the European Patent Organisation. Echoing these concerns, the Enlarged Board of Appeal in its decision R 19/12 regarded an objection of partiality against the Vice-President DG3 (Directorate-General Appeals) as justified on the grounds that he was acting both as chairman of the Enlarged Board of Appeal and as a member of the Management Committee of the EPO. The decision shows the persistent disquietude caused by the integration of the Boards of Appeal into the European Patent Office. This question, namely the question of the independence of the Boards of Appeal, was also raised by Spain "against the Regulations on the unitary patent" in cases C-146/13 and C-147/13.

== Case references ==
Each decision of the Boards of Appeal and the Enlarged Board of Appeal, as well as each opinion of the Enlarged Board of Appeal, has an alphanumeric reference, such as decision T 285/93. The first letter (or the text "Art 23") of the reference indicates the type of board which took the decision:

- G – Enlarged Board of Appeal (decisions and opinions under Article 112 EPC)
- R – Enlarged Board of Appeal (petitions for review under Article 112a EPC)
- T – Technical Board of Appeal
- J – Legal Board of Appeal
- D – Disciplinary Board of Appeal
- W – Decision concerning PCT reserves under Rule 40.2 PCT or Rule 68.3 PCT
- Art. 23 – Enlarged Board of Appeal (proposals to the Administrative Council under Article 23 EPC for removal from office of a member of the Boards of Appeal)

The number before the oblique is the serial number, allocated by chronological order of receipt at the DG3, the Directorate General 3 (Appeals) of the European Patent Office. The last two digits give the year of receipt of the appeal in DG3. The letter "V" is sometimes used to refer to a decision of an Examining or Opposition Division.

In addition to their alphanumeric reference, decisions are sometimes referred to and identified by their date to distinguish between decisions regarding the same case issued at a different date (e.g. T 843/91 of 17 March 1993 and T 843/91 of 5 August 1993 , T 59/87 of 26 April 1988 and T 59/87 of 14 August 1990 or T 261/88 of 28 March 1991 and T 261/88 of 16 February 1993 ).

== See also ==
- Art. 23 1/15, Art. 23 2/15 and Art. 23 1/16, decisions relating to the suspension of a member of the Boards of Appeal of the EPO
- Board of Patent Appeals and Interferences (BPAI), US appeal court
- European Court of Justice, the appeal court of the European Union, but which is not involved in the appeal procedure before the EPO
- European Patent Office Reports (EPOR), a case law reporter
- Wim van der Eijk, former Vice-President of the European Patent Office, head of the DG 3 (Appeals)
