= G 3/08 =

G 3/08

Enlarged Board of Appeal of the European Patent Office

ECLI:EP:BA:2009:G000308.20091016
Issued May 12, 2010
Board composition

Chairman: Peter Messerli (CH)
Members: Martin Vogel (DE) (rapporteur), Dai Rees (GB) (additional rapporteur), Michael Dorn (DK), André Klein (FR), Uwe Scharen (DE), Jean-Pierre Seitz (FR)

Headwords

Programs for computers

Under case number G 3/08, the Enlarged Board of Appeal of the EPO issued on May 12, 2010, an opinion in response to questions referred to it by the President of the European Patent Office (EPO), Alison Brimelow, on October 22, 2008. The questions subject of the referral related to the patentability of programs for computers under the European Patent Convention (EPC) and were, according to the President of the EPO, of fundamental importance as they related to the definition of "the limits of patentability in the field of computing." In a 55-page long opinion, the Enlarged Board of Appeal considered the referral to be inadmissible because no divergent decisions had been identified in the referral.

The referral had been quoted as relating to the "deeply contentious question about how to assess the patentability of software-related inventions". Alison Brimelow had been reported to have been considering referring the issue to the Enlarged Board of Appeal for almost two years.

Some amicus curiae briefs had anticipated that the referral would be considered inadmissible under the legal provisions of the EPC, and in particular Article 112(1)(b) EPC.

== Background ==
In addition to the Boards of Appeal before which decisions of the first instances of the EPO can be contested, the EPO includes an Enlarged Board of Appeal. This board does not constitute an additional level of jurisdiction in the classical sense. This instance takes decisions only when the case law of the Boards of Appeal becomes inconsistent or when an important point of law arises. Its purpose is "to ensure uniform application of the law" and to clarify or interpret important points of law in relation to the European Patent Convention. Only the Boards of Appeal themselves and the President of the EPO can refer a question to the Enlarged Board of Appeal. In the first case, the Enlarged Board issues a decision, while in the latter case it issues an opinion. G 3/08 is a referral of the President of the EPO under Article 112(1)(b) EPC.

Under Article 52(2)(c) EPC, the patentability of programs for computers is excluded. However, Article 52(3) EPC provides that this exclusion only applies to the extent to which a European patent application or European patent relates to such programs for computers "as such". The interpretation of the exclusion, including the words "as such", have caused applicants, attorneys, examiners, and judges a great deal of difficulty since the EPC came into force in 1978. An interpretation, which is followed by the Boards of Appeal of the EPO, is that an invention is patentable if it provides a new and non-obvious technical solution to a technical problem.

Referrals to the Enlarged Board of Appeal are said to be rare, happening only with the most complex questions. The patentability of software has provoked fierce debate in Europe over the recent years, especially in relation to the proposed European Union (EU) directive on the patentability of computer-implemented inventions. The directive was rejected in 2005 by the European Parliament, a decision that was welcomed by those on both sides of the debate, by those supporting the patentability of software in Europe as well as those opposing it.

== Questions ==
Four questions have been referred by the President of the EPO to the Enlarged Board of Appeal. The four questions have been chosen to look at four different aspects of patentability in the field of computer programs.

=== Question 1: Claim category ===
Can a computer program only be excluded as a computer program as such if it is explicitly claimed as a computer program?

A divergence between decisions T 1173/97, making no distinction between categories of claims, especially between computer-implemented claims and computer program claims, and T 424/03, making a distinction between these two categories, is cited as justifying this question.

=== Question 2: Claim as a whole ===
(a) Can a claim in the area of computer programs avoid exclusion under Art. 52(2)(c) and (3) merely by explicitly mentioning the use of a computer or a computer-readable data storage medium?

(b) If question 2(a) is answered in the negative, is a further technical effect necessary to avoid exclusion, said effect going beyond those effects inherent in the use of a computer or data storage medium to respectively execute or store a computer program?

A divergence between decisions T 1173/97 and T 258/03 is cited as justifying this question. Under T 1173/97, computer programs are methods, and in order to have a technical character computer programs must demonstrate a further technical effect (which goes beyond the "normal" physical interactions between program (software) and computer (hardware)). Under T 258/03, a method acquires a technical character simply by involving technical means.

=== Question 3: Individual features of a claim ===
(a) Must a claimed feature cause a technical effect on a physical entity in the real world in order to contribute to the technical character of the claim?
(b) If question 3 (a) is answered in the positive, is it sufficient that the physical entity be an unspecified computer?

(c) If question 3 (a) is answered in the negative, can features contribute to the technical character of the claim if the only effects to which they contribute are independent of any particular hardware that may be used?

A divergence between, on the one hand, decisions T 163/85 and T 190/94, according to which a technical effect on a physical entity in the real world is required (to escape the exclusion under Article 52(2)(c) and (3)), and, on the other hand, T 125/01 and T 424/03, according to which the technical effects can be essentially confined to the respective computer programs, is cited as justifying this question.

=== Question 4: The activity of programming ===
(a) Does the activity of programming a computer necessarily involve technical considerations?
(b) If question 4 (a) is answered in the positive, do all features resulting from programming thus contribute to the technical character of a claim?

(c) If question 4 (a) is answered in the negative, can features resulting from programming contribute to the technical character of a claim only when they contribute to a further technical effect when the program is executed?

A divergence between decisions considering that a programmer's activity, i.e. writing computer programs, falls within the exclusions of Article 52(2)(c) (T 833/91, T 204/93, and T 769/92) and decisions having taken the opposite view (T 1177/97 and T 172/03) is cited as justifying the question.

== Statements by third parties (Amicus curiae briefs) ==
On November 11, 2008, the Enlarged Board of Appeal decided to announce in the Official Journal of the EPO "further provisions concerning statements by third parties on the points of law concerning the patentability of programs for computers referred to it by the President of the European Patent Office". The expected announcement was made in the Official Journal of January 2009. Namely, any written statements, i.e. amicus curiae briefs, had to be filed by the end of April 2009.

Around a hundred amicus curiae briefs have been submitted, including briefs by Accenture, the Association for Competitive Technology (ACT), the American Intellectual Property Law Association (AIPLA), the International Association for the Protection of Industrial Property (AIPPI), Apple Inc., BT, BUSINESSEUROPE, Canonical Group Ltd, the Computer & Communication Industry Association (CCIA), Chartered Institute of Patent Attorneys (CIPA), the Computing Technology Industry Association (CompTIA), DIGITALEUROPE, Ericsson, the European Patent Institute (epi), the Foundation for a Free Information Infrastructure (FFII), the Free Software Foundation Europe (FSFE), the International Federation of Intellectual Property Attorneys (FICPI), France Télécom, IBM, the Irish Free Software Organisation (IFSO), ITechLaw, the Japan Intellectual Property Association (JIPA), Prof. Donald Knuth, Licensing Executives Society International (LESI), Microsoft Corporation and General Electric Company, Philips, the Pirate Party, Pitney Bowes, the Polish Patent Office, Red Hat, SAP, Siemens, Prof. Joseph Straus, the UNION of European Practitioners in Industrial Property, and the United Kingdom.

== Reception to the referral and further developments ==
According to the New York Times, the referral had been welcomed "by lawyers and software engineers alike".

After the referral, the England and Wales Court of Appeal did not give the UK Intellectual Property Office (UK-IPO) leave to appeal to the House of Lords regarding the Symbian's Patent Application case, "because in its view it would be premature for the House of Lords to decide what computer programs are patentable before the issue has been considered by the Enlarged Board of Appeal of the [EPO]."

== Interlocutory decision of 16 October 2009 ==
In an interlocutory decision of 16 October 2009, the Enlarged Board of Appeal dealt with an objection of partiality raised in an amicus brief. The objection of partiality was against a particular member of the Board, Dai Rees, and against the Board as a whole. The Enlarged Board of Appeal concluded that there was "no reason to exclude Mr Rees from its composition in case G 3/08 or to replace further members." The original composition of the Board therefore remained unchanged.

== Opinion ==
The reasons for the opinion first address the admissibility of the referral. After considering that the President of the EPO had not forfeited her right to a referral because the preceding President, Alain Pompidou, had declined in 2007 to refer questions to the Enlarged Board Appeal (when suggested to do so by British judge Lord Justice Jacob), the Board considered the referred questions to be undoubtedly of fundamental importance under Article 112(1)(b) EPC. The Board goes on by writing that the president's right of referral to the Enlarged Board does not extend to means of replacing Board of Appeal rulings with the decision of a putatively higher instance, as Article 112 EPC / Article 112a EPC does not constitute a further instance ranking above the Boards of Appeal within the EPC judicial system. According to the Board, "[the EPO's Boards of Appeal] are ... assigned interpretative supremacy with regard to the EPC in terms of its scope of application". The notion of "legal development" and its normal character are also addressed, in the context of the reference to "different decisions" in Article 112(1)(b) EPC, a requirement considered crucial for the referral to be admissible. The Board then concludes its "fundamental considerations on the interpretation of Article 112(1)(b) EPC" (before considering the questions of the referral themselves) as follows:

"the President [of the European Patent Office] has no right of referral under Article 112(1)(b) EPC simply in order to intervene, on whatever grounds, in mere legal development if on an interpretation of the notion of "different decisions" in the sense of conflicting decisions there is no need for correction to establish legal certainty."

== Reactions ==
Justine Pila argued that the basis for this decision is an interpretation of Article 112(1)(b) that is inconsistent with the principles of Articles 31 and 33 of the Vienna Convention, and that it offends the constitutional principles from which it was expressly derived. Namely she criticizes that the Boards’ approach

1. suffers from the same faulty logic for which the EBA criticized the President's referral,
2. lacks doctrinal and theoretical coherence, and
3. is incapable of producing legal certainty, either within the EPC or national (European) patent systems.

She concluded by criticizing the opinion, stating notably that "the EBA [had] rendered a decision that is higher on democratic language than democratic content" and that "the only hope is for the European or national Legislatures to recognize that “judiciary-driven legal development” within the EPO has indeed met its limits".

== See also ==
- List of decisions of the EPO Boards of Appeal relating to Article 52(2) and (3) EPC
- G 1/19, referral dealing with the patentability of computer-implemented simulations
