= T 1173/97 =

Patent law decision

T 1173/97
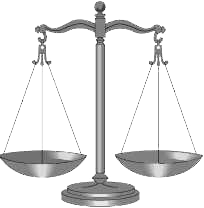

Board of Appeal of the European Patent Office

Issued July 1, 1998
Board composition

Chairman: P. K. J. van den Berg
Members: V. Di Cerbo, R. R. K. Zimmermann

Headwords

Computer program products/IBM

T 1173/97, also known as Computer program product/IBM or simply Computer program product, is a decision of a Technical Board of Appeal of the European Patent Office (EPO), issued on July 1, 1998. It is a landmark decision for interpreting Article 52(2) and (3) of the European Patent Convention (EPC) and whether computer programs are excluded from patentability under the EPC.

It mainly held that

"a computer program product is not excluded from patentability under Article 52(2) and (3) EPC if, when it is run on a computer, it produces a further technical effect which goes beyond the "normal" physical interactions between program (software) and computer (hardware)".

Decision T 1173/97 distinguished computer programs with a technical character from those with a non-technical character, and was thus based on an approach differing from the view taken by a number of previous decisions of the Boards of Appeal that all computer programs were excluded under Art. 52(2)(c) and (3) EPC.

T 1173/97, along with T 935/97 (not published in the Official Journal of the EPO), are considered to be "groundbreaking decisions". The Enlarged Board of Appeal has described T 1173/97 as

"seminal in its definition of 'further technical effect' and abandonment of the contribution approach to [the exclusion under Article 52(2) and (3) EPC]".

== Reasoning ==
The Board first examined the relationship between the TRIPS Agreement and the EPC. It confirmed that the TRIPS Agreement could not be directly applied to the EPC, but thought it appropriate to take the TRIPS Agreement into consideration, since it "gives a clear indication of current trends". The Board considered that "it is the clear intention of TRIPS [and in particular Art. 27(1) TRIPS ] not to exclude from patentability any inventions, whatever field of technology they belong to, and therefore, in particular, not to exclude programs for computers".

The Board however pointed out that "the only source of substantive patent law for examining European patent applications [at that moment was] the European Patent Convention". The Board therefore considered Art. 52(2) and (3) EPC and concluded that the combination of Art. 52(2) and (3) EPC (exclusion of computer programs, but only when the application relates to computer programs "as such") "demonstrates that the legislators did not want to exclude from patentability all programs for computers".

The Board then endeavored to determine the meaning of the expression "as such" in Article 52(3) EPC. It concluded that, if a computer program has a technical character, it should be considered patentable, since the technical character of an invention is generally accepted as an essential requirement for its patentability, In other words, "having technical character means not being excluded from patentability under the "as such" provision pursuant to Article 52(3) EPC."

=== Technical character ===
The Board next held that

"[for] the purpose of interpreting the exclusion from patentability of programs for computers under Article 52(2) and (3) EPC, ... programs for computers cannot be considered as having a technical character for the very reason that they are programs for computers".

otherwise, since all computer programs are suitable to run on a computer, no distinction could be made between, on the one hand, computer programs with a technical character and, on the other hand, computer programs as such. In other words, the mere fact that an invention is a computer program is not a sufficient reason to conclude that it has a technical character, when interpreting these legal provisions.

The technical character of computer programs, in view of these provisions, was found by the Board in the "further effects deriving from the execution (by the hardware) of the instructions given by the computer program", where these further effects have a technical character. An invention which brings about a technical effect may be considered to be an invention. A computer program must be considered to be invention within the meaning of Art. 52(1) EPC if it produces a technical effect.

Elaborating more on the further technical effect, the Board held that "a computer program product may ... possess a technical character because it has the potential to cause a predetermined further technical effect." Therefore "computer programs products are not excluded from patentability under all circumstances".

To summarize, the Board held that:

"a computer program claimed by itself is not excluded from patentability if the program, when running on a computer or loaded into a computer, brings about, or is capable of bringing about, a technical effect which goes beyond the "normal" physical interactions between the program (software) and the computer (hardware) on which it is run".

The Board also took the view that

"it does not make any difference whether a computer program is claimed by itself or as a record on a carrier".

=== Remittal ===
The case was then remitted to the first instance, i.e. the Examining Division, for further prosecution, and "in particular for examination of whether the wording of the ... claims [avoided] exclusion from patentability under Article 52(2) and (3) EPC."

=== Opinion on the contribution approach ===
The Board also used the opportunity to state that "determining the technical contribution an invention achieves with respect to the prior art is ... more appropriate for the purpose of examining novelty and inventive step than for deciding on possible exclusion under Article 52(2) and (3)." This was later emphasized in decisions T 931/95 and T 258/03.

== Later legal developments ==
As explained by the Enlarged Board of Appeal in its opinion G 3/08 of May 12, 2010, one particular view taken by the Board in decision T 1173/97 was not followed by later case law, in particular by later decision T 424/03. The Board in T 1173/97 took the view that it did not make any difference whether a computer program is claimed by itself or as a record on a carrier (in both cases a "further technical effect" would be required to comply with Article 52(2) and (3) EPC). This view however has been considered by the Enlarged Board of Appeal as contrary to the own premises of T 1173/97. The Board in T 424/03 (following and extending the reasoning of decision T 258/03) came to the conclusion that a claim to a computer program on a computer-readable medium necessarily avoids exclusion from patentability under Article 52(2) EPC, restricting the need of a "further technical effect" (to meet the provisions of Article 52(2) and (3) EPC) to computer programs claimed by themselves (i.e., not claimed on a computer-readable medium for instance).

== See also ==
- Software patents under the European Patent Convention
- List of decisions of the EPO Boards of Appeal relating to Article 52(2) and (3) EPC
- G 3/08, opinion issued by the Enlarged Board of Appeal following a referral by the President of the European Patent Office on the question of patentability of computer programs; the referral was eventually rejected as inadmissible
