= Hartmut Pilch =

German software developer and activist (born 1963)

- Born: 7 July 1963 (age 63)
- Occupations: Activist, software developer, translator
- Organisation: Foundation for a Free Information Infrastructure

Hartmut Pilch (born 7 July 1963) is a German digital rights and far-right political activist, who works as a software developer and translator. He is notable for establishing the Foundation for a Free Information Infrastructure (FFII) in 1999. He was among the original leaders of the local Pegida movement in Munich in 2015–2016.

== Activities ==
=== Digital rights activism ===
He took the lead in launching the FFII in Munich in February 1999, in response to the joint efforts of the European Commission and the European Patent Office (EPO) to liberalise patent law and facilitate software patenting in the European Union (EU). Prior to that he worked for the EPO in Munich.

In June 1999, acting on behalf of FFII, he co-founded the Eurolinux Alliance with Jean-Paul Smets of the Association francophone des utilisateurs de logiciels libres (AFUL). FFII then became a member organisation of the Eurolinux Alliance.

As president of the FFII, an organization that promotes software patent reform and digital freedom of speech, he oversaw an intense lobbying period aimed at EU agencies between 2000 and 2005. In late 2000, Eurolinux mobilised a collective response to the EU consultation on proposed changes to patent law.

In 2000, he led a campaign aimed to prevent the removal of the exclusion of computer programs as such from patenting in Art. 52(2) of the European Patent Convention. In 2003, he led again a campaign against the patentability of software in Europe. On 4 April 2003, he and Alexandre Dulaunoy of the Association Electronique Libre submitted a petition against software patenting with 140,000 signatures to the European Parliament (EP). Along with the support of an extensive grassroots network, he lobbied and convinced the EP members to amend a directive proposal on the Patentability of Computer-Implemented Inventions (initially written by the European Commission). He built an extensive network of individual contacts also outside the FFII, and had a direct connection to the Greens–European Free Alliance Group, the European People's Party – European Democrats (EPP-ED) Group and the Party of European Socialists in the EP. He also voiced strong opposition to EPO practices regarding software patents.

In November 2005, at the General Assembly of the FFII e. V., Pilch stepped aside as president of the FFII, and Pieter Hintjens, CEO of iMatix, was elected as his successor. Pilch continued on the board of FFII as its vice-president and then (as of 2013) treasurer.

=== Pegida activism ===
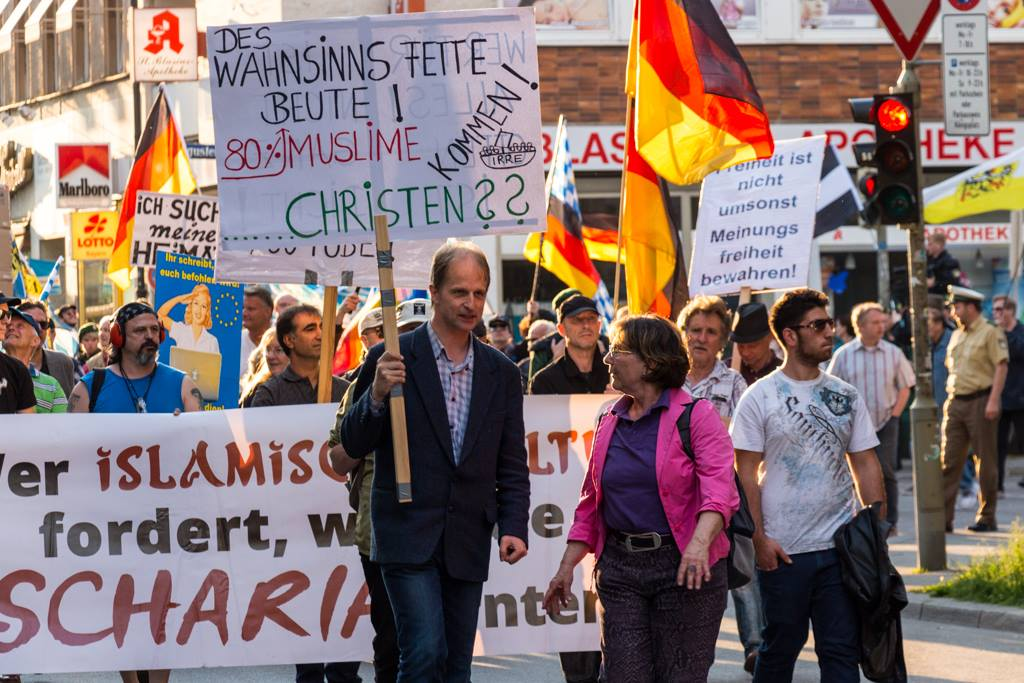
Hartmut Pilch together with the Pegida Munich board member Birgit Weißmann on a Pegida Munich rally.

In 2014 or 2015, he was involved in organising Pegida in Munich together with Heinz Meyer, who became its leader, and Stefan Werner. He took up a role as the movement's spokesperson and "leading intellectual". He addressed several Pegida rallies in Munich, including one on 7 September 2015 alongside Tatjana Festerling, where he criticised "Juncker’s and Merkel’s human rights dogmatism" and argued that the 2015 European migrant crisis was beyond Europe's responsibility.

In May 2016, he and Werner were expelled by Meyer from Pegida's steering committee in Munich for organising a local twenty-strong solidarity demonstration in support of Alternative for Germany, which Meyer branded "superfluous", and the Bavarian website of Pegida was taken over by the Dresden headquarters of the party. At that time, his other close associate in Pegida's Bavarian structures was Susanne Helfenbein of the Freedom Party of Austria.

== Work ==
He is a former employee of SuSE.

Pilch's work as a translator focuses primarily on Chinese and Japanese. He is also a student of Lojban, a constructed language, and has worked as an interpreter.

== Personal life ==
He is married to Wang Tao, they have three children. He resided in Munich as of 2006.

== Publications ==
- (with Jean-Paul Smets) "Software Patentability with Compensatory Regulation: A Cost Evaluation", Upgrade vol. 2 (2001), no. 6, p. 23–32
- "Why Are Software Patents So Trivial?", in Patents, Innovation and Economic Performance: OECD Conference Proceedings, ed. Catalina Martinez, Jerry Sheehan and Dominique Guellec (Paris: Organisation for Economic Co-operation and Development, 2004), pp. 289–94 ISBN 9789264015265
- (with Georg Jakob) On the Grammar of Patent Claims, 2008

== Bibliography ==
- Haunss, Sebastian (2013), Conflicts in the Knowledge Society: The Contentious Politics of Intellectual Property, Cambridge: Cambridge University Press, doi:10.1017/CBO9781139567633, ISBN 978-1-139-56763-3
