= List of decisions of the EPO Boards of Appeal relating to Article 52(2) and (3) EPC =

This list provides a guide to decisions of the Boards of Appeal of the European Patent Office (EPO) relating to Article 52(2) and (3) EPC. These decisions touch the issue of patentable subject-matter under the European Patent Convention (EPC). The accompanying notes offer an explanation as to the content of the decision. For an introduction to patentable subject-matter under the EPC, see Patentable subject-matter under the EPC and Software patents under the EPC. The organisation of the list is by date of the decision. The criteria for inclusion in the list are:

- the decision has been published on the Official Journal of the EPO (OJ), or will be published at the Official Journal, as indicated in the decision; and
- the decision explicitly mentions Article 52(2) and/or (3) EPC in the reasons, unless the mention is tangential or the case exclusively relates to procedural questions. (Note: The following decisions have been published on the Official Journal of the EPO, or will be published at the Official Journal, and the decision explicitly mentions Article 52(2) and/or (3) EPC in the reasons, but the mention is only tangential or the case exclusively relates to procedural questions. The mention of Article 52(2) and/or (3) EPC is tangential in the following cases: In decision T 820/92, (Contraceptive method/THE GENERAL HOSPITAL), of January 11, 1994, (OJ 3/1995, 113), the Board held that a parallel could not be made between Article 52(2) EPC and Article 52(4) EPC because no provision similar to Article 52(3) EPC limits the exclusion of Article 52(4) EPC (T 820/92, Reasons for the decision 5.4).; In decision T 1055/92, (Clarity/AMPEX CORPORATION), of March 31, 1994, (OJ 4/1995, 214), the Board mentioned Article 52(2) to state that it had not investigated "how far the invention as claimed might fall under the exclusions of Article 52(2) EPC" (T 1055/92, Reasons 7).; In decision T 82/93, (Cardiac pacing/TELECTRONICS), of May 15, 1995, (OJ 5/1996, 274), the attention was again drawn on the difference between Article 52(2) EPC and Article 52(4) EPC, respectively. (T 82/93, Reasons 1.1); In decision T 1054/96, (Transgenic plant/NOVARTIS), of October 13, 1997, (OJ 11/1998, 511), the Board held that the exclusion of plant and animal varieties in Article 53(b) EPC is in a different category from the exclusions of Article 52(2) and (4) EPC (T 1054/96, Reasons 45, 53 and 57).; In decisions J 9/98 and J 10/98, (Priority from India/ASTRAZENECA), of December 2, 2002, (OJ 5/2003, 184), it was briefly mentioned that the question of the compliance of EPC provisions with the provisions of the TRIPS Agreement had been touched in T 1173/97 and T 935/97 regarding the definition of the exclusion of programs for computers as such from patentability in Article 52(2) and (3) EPC.; The following cases relate to procedural questions: Decision T 937/91, (Grounds for opposition/THOMAS DE LA RUE), of November 10, 1994 (OJ 1-2/1996, 25).; Decision G 1/95, (Fresh grounds for opposition/DE LA RUE), of July 19, 1996 (OJ 11/1996, 615).)

== 1980 – 1989 ==
- March 19, 1986, T 51/84 (Coded distinctive mark/Stockburger). The Board held that if a claim focuses solely on procedural steps involved in applying a coded distinctive mark to an object without indicating or presupposing technical means for carrying them out, a process of this kind is excluded from patentability by Article 52(2)(c) and (3) EPC.
- July 15, 1986, T 208/84 (Computer-related invention/VICOM). This decision set out the principles governing the patentability of computer-related inventions. The Board held that the fact that the idea or concept underlying the subject-matter of a claim resides in a mathematical method does not necessarily mean that the claimed subject-matter is a mathematical method "as such". "Decisive is what technical contribution the invention as defined in the claim when considered as a whole makes to the known art".
- May 21, 1987, T 26/86 (X-ray apparatus/KOCH & STERZEL).
- September 5, 1988, T 115/85 (Computer-related invention/IBM).
- October 5, 1988, T 22/85 (Document abstracting and retrieving/IBM).
- October 6, 1988, T 6/83 (Data processor network/IBM).
- February 14, 1989, T 38/86 (Text processing/IBM).
- March 14, 1989, T 163/85, (Colour television signal/BBC).
- April 25, 1989, T 119/88, (Coloured disk jacket/FUJI).
- December 11, 1989, G 2/88, (Friction reducing additive/MOBIL OIL III). In this case, one of the parties raised the issue of Article 52(2) EPC and the exclusion of "discoveries" from patentability in relation to a claim. The Enlarged Board of Appeal however held that the claim in question was not novel, so it considered that "of course" it was unnecessary to examine the exclusion from patentability under Article 52(2) EPC. The Board also mentioned that, in a particular case, concurrent novelty objections and objections under Article 52(2) and (3) EPC could exist, but that they were distinct objections.
- December 12, 1989, T 158/88 (Character form/SIEMENS).

== 1990 – 1994 ==
- July 3, 1990, T 603/89, (Marker/BEATTIE).
- March 19, 1992, T 854/90, (Card reader/IBM).
- April 9, 1992, T 164/92, (Electronic computer components / ROBERT BOSCH)
- April 15, 1993, T 110/90, (Editable document form/IBM).
- May 31, 1994, T 769/92 (General-purpose management system/SOHEI). The Board held that a method was considered not excluded under Art. 52(2) and (3) EPC "if technical considerations concerning particulars of the solution of the problem the invention solves are required in order to carry out that same invention."
- July 6, 1994, T 1002/92 (Queueing system/PETTERSSON).

== 1995 – 1999 ==
- July 1, 1998, T 1173/97 (Computer program product/IBM), which is considered a landmark decision for the current approach, as of 2012, to the patentability of computer-implemented inventions.

== 2000 – 2004 ==
- March 15, 2000, T 1194/97, (Data structure product/PHILIPS).
- September 8, 2000, T 931/95, (Pension Benefit Systems Partnership), which is also considered a landmark decision for the current approach, as of 2012, to the patentability of computer-implemented inventions.
- September 26, 2002, T 641/00 (Two identities/COMVIK), which is considered a further landmark decision for the current approach, as of 2012, to the patentability of computer-implemented inventions.
- April 21, 2004, T 258/03 (Auction Method/Hitachi). In this landmark decision for the current approach, as of 2012, to the patentability of computer-implemented inventions, the Board went further than the Pension Benefit decision (T 931/95) and held that, in general, a method involving technical means is an invention within the meaning of Article 52(1) EPC.
- July 6, 2004, T 315/03 (Transgenic animals/HARVARD). The Board stated that certain categories of subject-matter are not regarded as inventions at all – these are sometimes called the exclusions (Article 52(2)(3) EPC), in contrast to certain other categories of subject-matter, while being considered as being inventions, are denied the protection of patents – these are sometimes called the exceptions (Article 53 EPC).

== 2005 – 2009 ==
- December 16, 2005, G 1/04 (Diagnostic methods). The Board held that, "the deductive medical or veterinary decision phase, diagnosis for curative purposes in itself is an intellectual exercise, unless, as a result of developments in the field of diagnostic technology, a device capable of reaching diagnostic conclusions can be used. As an intellectual exercise, pursuant to Article 52(2) EPC, the deductive decision phase is not regarded as an invention within the meaning of Article 52(1) EPC, whereas the method carried out by the device might well represent an invention within the meaning of this provision."
- March 22, 2006, T 388/04 (Undeliverable mail/PITNEY BOWES). The Board held that "subject-matter or activities that are excluded from patentability under Article 52(2) and (3) EPC remain so even where they imply the possibility of making use of unspecified technical means", such as an unspecified computer.
- March 22, 2006, T 619/02 (Odour selection/QUEST INTERNATIONAL).
- October 20, 2006, T 1242/04 (Provision of product specific data/MAN).
- November 15, 2006, T 154/04 (Estimating sales activity / DUNS LICENSING ASSOCIATES). This landmark decision summarizes the current approach, as of 2012, regarding the patentability of computer-implemented inventions.
- December 13, 2006, T 1227/05 (Schaltkreissimulation I / Infineon Technologies). The board held that, beyond its implementation, a procedural step may contribute to the technical character of a claimed method only to the extent that it serves a technical purpose of the method. In that light, simulation methods which form an essential part of the fabrication process and precede actual production, mostly as an intermediate step, cannot be denied a technical effect merely on the grounds that they do not yet incorporate the physical end product.

== 2010 – 2019 ==
- May 12, 2010, G 3/08 (Programs for computers), opinion issued by the Enlarged Board of Appeal following the referral by the President of the EPO on October 22, 2008. The referral relating the patentability of programs for computers was dismissed as inadmissible by the Enlarged Board of Appeal. The Enlarged Board considered that there was only a development in the case law, rather than a divergence in decisions given by the Boards of Appeal on the question of patentability of computer-implemented inventions.

== From 2020 ==
- March 10, 2021, G 1/19 (Simulations), decision issued by the Enlarged Board of Appeal following a referral by the Technical Board of Appeal 3.5.07 in the interlocutory decision of T489/14 on February 22, 2019

== See also ==
- List of UK judgments relating to excluded subject matter
- List of patent case law
