= T 931/95 =

Decision of a Technical Board of Appeal of the European Patent Office

T 931/95

Board of Appeal of the European Patent Office

Issued 8 September 2000
Board composition

Chairman: P. K. J. van den Berg
Members: R. R. K. Zimmermann, V. Di Cerbo

Headwords

Controlling pension benefits system/PBS PARTNERSHIP

T 931/95, commonly known as Pension Benefit Systems Partnership, is a decision of a Technical Board of Appeal of the European Patent Office (EPO), issued on 8 September 2000. At the time, it was a landmark decision for interpreting Article 52(1) and (2) of the European Patent Convention (EPC) but has now largely been superseded by the decisions in T 641/00 (Comvik, Two identities) and T 258/03 (Hitachi, Auction Method).

It stated that having a technical character is an implicit requirement of the EPC to be met by an invention in order to be patentable. In other words, the technical character requirement is inherent to the notion "invention" in Article 52(1). It also confirmed that methods only involving economic concepts and practices of doing business, or methods for doing business as such, are not inventions within the meaning of Article 52(1) EPC, and are therefore not patentable.

In 2001, decision T 931/95, along with decision T 769/92 ("Sohei case"), were considered the most relevant cases from the EPO Boards of Appeal regarding business methods.

== Decision ==
The Board of Appeal first drew a distinction between a method for doing business as such, excluded under Article 52(2)(c) EPC (Article 52(2) EPC provides that methods for doing business are not regarded as inventions within the meaning of Article 52(1) EPC), and a method for doing business having a technical character. The mere fact that data processing and computing means, i.e. technical means, are recited in a method claim does not necessarily confer a technical character to the claimed method. In other words, "technical means for a purely nontechnical purpose and/or for processing purely nontechnical information does not necessarily confer technical character".

In contrast, regarding an apparatus claim, the Board stated that

a computer system suitably programmed for use in a particular field, even if that is the field of business and economy, has the character of a concrete apparatus in the sense of a physical entity, man-made for a utilitarian purpose and is thus an invention within the meaning of Article 52(1) EPC.

This distinction of treatment between methods and apparatuses is justified by the mention of "method" but not apparatus in the exclusion of Art. 52(2)(c) EPC. The recent decision T 258/03 does not make this distinction between method and apparatus claims anymore.

Regarding the fact that the meaning of the term "technical" or "technical character" may not be particularly clear, the Board stated this also applied to the term "invention". "(...) [T]he fact that the exact meaning of a term may be disputed does in itself not necessarily constitute a good reason for not using that term as a criterion, certainly not in the absence of a better term: case law may clarify the issue."

The Board also rejected the so-called "contribution approach", which consists in distinguishing between "new features" of an invention and features of that invention which are known from the prior art when examining whether the invention concerned may be considered to be an invention within the meaning of Art. 52(1) EPC.

Although the claim under examination was found to meet Art. 52 EPC requirement, the claim was eventually considered to lack inventive step. The improvement put forward by the invention belonged to the field of economy and could not therefore contribute to inventive step.

== See also ==
- Software patents under the European Patent Convention
- List of decisions of the EPO Boards of Appeal relating to Article 52(2) and (3) EPC
