= AEL =

AEL may refer to:

== Organizations ==
=== Sports organizations ===
- AEL Limassol (Athlitiki Enosi Limassol), a Cypriot sports club, most known for its football section
  - AEL Limassol B.C., a Cypriot basketball club
- Athletic Union of Larissa (Athlitiki Enosi Larissa 1964), Greek sports club
  - A.E.L. 1964 B.C., AE Larissa GS, Greek professional basketball club
  - Athlitiki Enosi Larissa F.C., or Larissa, a Greek football club

=== Other organizations ===
- AEL (motorcycle), an early-20th century motorcycle maker in Coventry, England
- African Explosives, a mining services company headquartered in Johannesburg
- American Electronics Laboratories, former parent of Mooney International Corporation
- Arab European League, in Belgium and the Netherlands
- Asiatic Exclusion League, in the US and Canada
- Association Electronique Libre

== Other uses ==
- Acute eosinophilic leukemia, a form of leukemia
- Airport Express (MTR), a railway line serving Hong Kong International Airport in Hong Kong
- Albert Lea Municipal Airport in Minnesota, US (IATA airport code AEL)
- Ambele language of Cameroon, ISO 639-3 code ael
- Authorized Equipment List, items eligible for the Homeland Security Grant Program

== See also ==
- Aël, a village in Aymavilles, Italy, notable for the Pont d'Aël Roman Aqueduct
