= Computer programs and the Patent Cooperation Treaty =

There are two provisions in the regulations annexed to the Patent Cooperation Treaty (PCT) that relate to the search and examination of patent applications concerning computer programs. These two provisions are present in the PCT, which does not provide for the grant of patents but provides a unified procedure for filing, searching and examining patent applications, called international applications. The question of patentability is touched when conducting the search and the examination, which is an examination of whether the invention appears to be patentable.

These two provisions are Rule 39.1 PCT and Rule 67.1 PCT, and, in conjunction respectively with Article 17(2)(a)(i) PCT and Article 34(4)(a)(i) PCT, may have a concrete impact on the procedure under the PCT, in the search and examination performed under the PCT. Indeed, depending on the patent office which is in charge of the search or examination under the PCT, the application filed for an invention relating to a computer program may or may not be searched or examined. In addition, the ISA and IPEA (see background section) that do not search such applications to a certain extent have diverging practices with respect to determinations of exclusions as to computer programs.

In addition to the consequences these legal provisions may have in practice, Rule 39.1 PCT is also significant from an interpretive perspective to understand the origin of the much debated Article 52(2) and (3) EPC (see Software patents under the European Patent Convention (EPC) and Article 52 EPC). The computer program exclusion was indeed inserted in the EPC in line with Rule 39.1 PCT, so that Rule 39.1 predates Art. 52(2) and (3) EPC.

== Background ==
The Patent Cooperation Treaty (PCT) is an international patent law treaty, which provides a unified procedure for filing patent applications. A patent application filed under the PCT is called an international application or a PCT application.

The filing of an international application results in an international search performed by a patent office, accompanied with a written opinion regarding the patentability of the invention which is the subject of the application. An applicant may also request an international preliminary examination performed by a patent office. The PCT does not provide that the searches and examinations are to be performed by one central patent office, as the WIPO does not perform searches and examinations. In contrast, the European Patent Convention (EPC) places the European Patent Office (EPO) in charge of performing searches and examinations for European patent applications.

Under the PCT, the international search and the optional international preliminary examination are conducted by different national or regional patent offices, referred to as the International Searching Authorities (ISA) and the International Preliminary Examining Authority (IPEA) Applicants, based on nationality and on the Receiving Office where the application was filed, may have an opportunity to have the search performed by one of the ISAs.

== The relevant provisions in the regulations ==
The regulations under the PCT do touch on the search and examination of computer programs.

Rule 39.1 PCT states that

No International Searching Authority shall be required to search an international application if, and to the extent to which, its subject matter is any of the following: ... (vi) computer programs to the extent that the International Searching Authority is not equipped to search prior art concerning such programs. (emphasis added)

Rule 67.1 PCT states that

No International Preliminary Examining Authority shall be required to carry out an international preliminary examination on an international application if, and to the extent to which, its subject matter is any of the following: ... (vi) computer programs to the extent that the International Preliminary Examining Authority is not equipped to carry out an international preliminary examination concerning such programs [emphasis added].

According to the Board of Appeal 3.5.1 of the EPO, these provisions mean that the ISA and IPEA authorities are not required to carry out searches or preliminary examinations in respect of programs if, for example, they have no examiners trained to do so or are not equipped with appropriate search material. The Board went on to say:

However, it is not to be inferred from these rules that searches or examinations in the software field are to be ruled out in international authorities. On the contrary, it seems ... that according to the PCT searches and, if applicable, examinations of this type can and may very well (perhaps even should) be carried out if the competent authority is appropriately equipped.

These provisions deal only with the international searches and international preliminary examinations and not with the national and regional searches or examinations.

== Practices by ISA and IPEA ==
The different ISA and IPEA have made use of the legal provisions of Articles 17(2)(a)(i) and 34(4)(a)(i) PCT in conjunction with Rules 39.1 and 67.1 in a different manner. In addition, as mentioned above, the ISA and IPEA that have made use of these provisions have diverging practices with respect to determinations of exclusions as to computer programs.

For instance, the European Patent Office (EPO), acting as ISA and IPEA, is not obliged to search, by virtue of Article 17(2)(a)(i) PCT, or examine, by virtue of Article 34(4)(a)(i) PCT, any international application to the extent that the EPO considers that such application relates to subject matter which does not comply with the provisions of the European Patent Convention to such an extent that it is not possible to carry out a meaningful search into the state of the art on the basis of all or some of the claims. The EPO acting as ISA or IPEA in the PCT procedure is therefore not obliged to search or examine some PCT applications when not equipped to do so.

== Origin and interpretive significance of the provisions ==
The computer program exclusion of Rule 39.1 PCT, which originally appears to be for "equipment" reasons, dates from 1969:

[The subject matter for which the International Searching Authority is not required to search] includes mathematical and scientific theories, plant and animal varieties except for microbiology, ornamental designs. It also includes computer programs but only to the extent that the International Searching Authority is not equipped to search prior art concerning such programs.

Rule 39.1 PCT is significant from an interpretive perspective to understand the origin of the much debated Article 52(2) and (3) EPC (see Software patents under the European Patent Convention (EPC) and Article 52 EPC). The computer program exclusion was indeed inserted in the EPC in line with Rule 39.1 PCT, so that Rule 39.1 predates Art. 52(2) and (3) EPC. However, while the PCT condition for excluding computer programs is a question of equipment, the EPC condition is a question of "computer program as such".

According to some, the fact that the PCT does not deal directly with the scope of patentable subject matter, in relation to computer programs, adds "weight to the contention that, having been born out of administrative inconvenience rather than any great principle, restrictions on patentability of programs should be limited to the maximum possible extent."

In the judgment in CFPH LLC's Applications, Peter Prescott referred to Rule 39.1 PCT when discussing the motivation behind the exclusion from patent protection of programs for computers under UK law. He commented that, at the time the EPC was under consideration (during the 1970s), "it was felt that searching the prior art would be a big problem" and that "Rule 39(1) of the Patent Co-operation Treaty recognised that an International Searching Authority might not be suitably equipped".

== Consequences on national and regional phases ==
These provisions have no legal consequence as regards the patentability in national or regional patent offices designated in a PCT application, as the law of most national or regional offices requires that they draw their own conclusions based on their own national or regional patent law. This is in complete compliance with the PCT since Article 27(5) PCT provides that, as far as substantive conditions of patentability are concerned, national and regional patent laws prevail:

Nothing in this Treaty and the Regulations is intended to be construed as prescribing anything that would limit the freedom of each Contracting State to prescribe such substantive conditions of patentability as it desires.
