= Florian Müller (author) =

Florian Müller (born 21 January 1970 in Augsburg, Germany) is an app developer and an intellectual property activist. He consulted for Microsoft and writes the FOSSPatents blog about patent and copyright issues. From 1985 to 1998, he was a computer magazine writer and consultant for companies, helping with collaborations between software companies. In 2004 he founded the NoSoftwarePatents campaign and in 2007 he provided some consultancy in relation to football policy.

== Software industry and computer books ==
In 1985, Müller started writing articles for German computer magazines. A year later, at age 16, he became Germany's youngest computer book author.

In 1996, he co-founded an online gaming service named Rival Network, which in early 2000 was acquired by the Telefónica group. From 2001 to 2004, Müller advised the CEO of MySQL AB, developer of the namesake open-source database management software product.

== Campaign against EU software patents ==
In 2004, Müller received the support of corporate sponsors 1&1, Red Hat and MySQL for launching NoSoftwarePatents.com, which opposed the European Commission's proposed directive on the patentability of computer-implemented inventions. Following several years of intensive lobbying by many parties, this proposed directive was rejected by the European Parliament on 6 July 2005, with 648 out of 680 votes cast.

For his political activities, Müller received several awards in 2005. A leading publication for intellectual property lawyers, "Managing Intellectual Property", counted Müller – along with the Chinese vice premier Wu Yi – among the "top 50 most influential people in intellectual property" (renominated in 2006). IT-focused website Silicon.com listed him among the Silicon Agenda Setters. A jury of EU-focused weekly newspaper "European Voice" elected Müller as one of the "EV50 Europeans of the Year 2005", and handed him the "EU Campaigner of the Year 2005" award. Jointly with the FFII, Müller received the "CNET Networks UK Technology Award" in the "Outstanding Contribution to Software Development" category.

== Football policy ==
After more than 20 years in the IT industry, Müller became involved with football (soccer) politics in 2007. He advised the Spanish football club Real Madrid with respect to a European Union policy-making initiative concerning professional sports.

== Google ==
=== Oracle v. Google ===
In January 2011 Müller published an article suggesting that "evidence is mounting that different components of the Android mobile operating system may indeed violate copyrights of Sun Microsystems, a company Oracle acquired a year ago." and presented what he believed was copyright infringing material, an article which was heavily criticized by two technical bloggers. According to Ed Burnette, a ZDNet blogger, Google published those files on its web site to help developers debug and test their own code. ArsTechnica's Ryan Paul also said that these findings in the online codebase are also not evidence that copyright infringing code is distributed on Android handsets. Two days after his original assertions Müller claimed to have found the files in the official source availability packages of device makers Motorola, LG and Samsung. The lawsuit ended with both parties agreeing to zero dollars in statutory damages for a small amount of copied code, so that Oracle could appeal.

In April 2012, Müller said he had been hired by Oracle to consult on competition-related topics including FRAND licensing terms. In a court filing in the Oracle v. Google case, Oracle stated that it paid Florian Müller as a consultant. Müller said "In April, I proactively announced a broadly-focused consulting relationship with Oracle, six months after announcing a similar working relationship with Microsoft".

=== License violation accusation ===
Müller amplified a Huffington Post article by Edward Naughton, an intellectual property lawyer who has previously represented Microsoft, who suggested that Google likely violated the GPL by copying Linux header files. The accusation was dismissed by Linus Torvalds, the original author and chief architect of the Linux Kernel.

== Microsoft and Oracle consulting ==
After pressure to disclose from the free software community, Müller acknowledged that he consults for both Microsoft and Oracle.
