= Computer program product =

The terms "computer program product" and "program product" may refer to:

- Software as a product
- T 1173/97, a decision by the Board of Appeal in the European Patent Office, which is also known as Computer program product/IBM or simply Computer program product
- computer programming when considered as a product of labor
