= Proposed directive on the patentability of computer-implemented inventions =

Directive
- European Union directive
- Title: Proposal for a Directive of the European Parliament and of the Council on the patentability of computer-implemented inventions

The Proposal for a Directive of the European Parliament and of the Council on the patentability of computer-implemented inventions (Commission proposal COM(2002) 92), procedure number 2002/0047 (COD), was a proposal for a European Union (EU) directive aiming to harmonise national patent laws and practices concerning the granting of patents for computer-implemented inventions, provided they meet certain criteria. The European Patent Office describes a computer-implemented invention (CII) as "one which involves the use of a computer, computer network or other programmable apparatus, where one or more features are realised wholly or partly by means of a computer program".

The proposal became a major focus for conflict between those who regarded the proposed directive as a way to codify the case law of the Boards of Appeal of the European Patent Office (unrelated to the EU institutions) in the sphere of computing, and those who asserted that the directive is an extension of the patentability sphere, not just a harmonisation, that ideas are not patentable and that the expression of those ideas is already adequately protected by the law of copyright.

Following several years of debate and numerous conflicting amendments to the proposal, the proposal was rejected on 6 July 2005 by the European Parliament by an overwhelming majority of 648 to 14 votes.

== History ==
=== Original draft ===
On 20 February 2002, the European Commission initiated a proposal for a directive to codify and "harmonise" the different EU national patent laws and cement the practice of the European Patent Office of granting patents for computer-implemented inventions provided they meet certain criteria (cf. software patents under the European Patent Convention). The directive also took on the role of excluding "business methods" from patentability (in contrast with the situation under United States law), because business methods as such are not patentable under the different European national patent laws or under the European Patent Convention.

Opponents of the original directive claimed that it was a thinly disguised attempt to make all software patentable. Supporters, however, argued that this was not the case since the proposal explained in several locations (pages 11, 14, 24, 25) that there should be no extension to the existing scope of patentability for computer programs and that pure business methods implemented in software would not be patentable. Only computer programs which provided a "technical contribution" would be patentable.

This reliance on the word "technical" was an important weakness in the directive, since it is not a word that has a well-defined meaning, and a "technical contribution" was only defined as being "a contribution to the state of the art in a technical field which is not obvious to a person skilled in the art" (see Article 2 of the proposal). Nevertheless, the term has been used as a benchmark for what is and is not patentable by the European Patent Office and by individual national Patent Offices and courts in Europe (particularly the United Kingdom and Germany) since the early 1980s. A general understanding of its meaning can be gleaned from studying the resulting case law, summarised in Software patents under the European Patent Convention. The subsequent failure of the European Parliament to develop an acceptable definition of what was meant by the word 'technical' illustrates the difficulty inherent in attempting to do so.

=== Transformation by the European Parliament ===
On 24 September 2003, the European Parliament passed the directive in a heavily amended form, which placed significant limits on the patentability of software. The most significant changes included:

- a definition of the "technicity" requirement for patentability which distinguishes between abstract information-processing processes and specific kinds of physical processes (only the latter are "technical");
- a blanket rule that patents cannot be used to prevent interoperability between computer systems.

Patent attorney Axel H. Horns, however, voiced concern that Parliament's wording might extend the ban on software patents to inventions potentially implementable in software, such as signal processing equipment.

Politically, these amendments were supported almost unanimously by small parties on both the right and left, while the larger groupings (socialists, liberals and conservatives) were all split, with the balance of socialists leaning in favour of amendment and the balance of conservatives leaning against.

Parliament's amendments were a major defeat for the directive's original proponents. Rather than confirming the practice of granting patents for computer programs which provide a technical contribution, the revised directive placed substantial limits on patentability.

=== Reversion by the Council of Ministers ===
Under the codecision procedure, both the European Parliament and the Council of Ministers (representing national Governments) must approve a text in identical terms in order for a proposal to become law. On 18 May 2004, the Council agreed in an advisory vote to resubmit to Parliament what was described as a "compromise version" of the proposal. The agreed version permitted patenting of computer-implemented inventions (providing the inventions have a "technical character") and overturned most of Parliament's amendments. Critics of the Directive argued that the "technical character" requirement was open to too much interpretation and could lead to almost unlimited patentability of software. Proponents, also, felt that the amended version contained too many ambiguities to be capable of meeting the original purpose of the Directive, which was to harmonise the law across Europe. Nevertheless, the Council formally approved this resolution on 7 March 2005. The revised proposal was resubmitted to Parliament.

=== Developments between first Parliament decision and Council decision ===
Subsequently, in an unprecedented move, the Dutch national parliament passed a motion requesting that the nation's ministerial representative on the council, Laurens Jan Brinkhorst, change his vote on the council's version of the directive, from "in favour" to abstention. Brinkhorst stated that he would not do this. The council's confirmation (or otherwise) of its President's "compromise" had also been delayed.

The Polish government announced on 16 November 2004 that it could not "support the text that was agreed upon by Council on 18 May 2004". A joint press release by the FFII, the Internet Society Poland, and NoSoftwarePatents.com, supported the concerns of opponents of the Council directive, stating:

at a meeting hosted by the Polish government on the 5th of this month, everyone including representatives of the Polish Patent Office, SUN, Novell, Hewlett-Packard and Microsoft, as well as various patent lawyers, confirmed that the present proposal of the EU Council does make all software potentially patentable.

On 7 December 2004, the Belgian Minister of Economic Affairs, Marc Verwilghen, stated that no Council decision would be taken until 2005 "for the reason that the qualified majority does not exist anymore". However, amid rumours of a change in the Polish position, 13–15 December meeting of the council's Committee of Permanent Representatives determined that a qualified majority appeared to exist, and that the council's revised version of the directive would be scheduled for formal adoption by the council, without further debate, probably at the Agricultures and Fisheries Council meeting on 21 and 22 December 2004.

Statements expressing reservations were attached to this Common Position by Belgium (which abstained), France (which hoped for further changes to the directive), the Netherlands (where the parliament requested their representative vote against), Poland (which was opposed until recent diplomatic pressure), Hungary, and Latvia. Germany was ambivalent, saying that the text of the directive could benefit from improvements.

Due to the expressed reservations and especially to opposition from Poland, whose Minister of Science and Information Technology made a special journey to Brussels to demand that the directive be dropped from the agenda, the council's vote was postponed "indefinitely".

Meanwhile, a group of 61 MEPs from 13 countries tabled a "motion for a resolution" to restart the entire legislative process. On 2 February 2005, JURI, the Legal Affairs Committee of the European Parliament, voted 19–1 in favour of asking the commission to withdraw the directive and restart the process.

The next day, Nicolas Schmit, deputy foreign minister of Luxembourg (which at that time chaired the council), said that he would instead ask the council to formally adopt the draft directive at a meeting on 17 February. Although Poland stated it would only oppose this if other countries raised an objection, reports of opposition from Denmark, the Netherlands and Spain ensured that the common position was not on the agenda for that meeting of the commission.

On 17 February, Parliament's Conference of Presidents (the President of the Parliament and the leaders of the political groups) approved JURI's request to restart the process, and agreed to pass the request to the European Commission. On 24 February, a plenary session of the European Parliament reinforced this message, inviting the commission to reconsider, but on 28 February the Commission refused the parliament's request.

The "common position" reappeared on the agenda of the council's 7 March meeting as an "A-item" for adoption without discussion. At the Competitiveness meeting of the council, Denmark requested that this be removed. The President of the council, seemingly in breach of the council's procedures, opposed this, "for administrative reasons" and because it would defeat the logic of the directive. The Danish representative accepted this at face value, declined to object formally, and entered Denmark's objections into the record. The common position was thus adopted without debate, and referred to the European Parliament for a second reading, with dissenting statements and caveats from a number of countries. In the event, only Spain had actually voted against: Austria, Belgium and Italy abstained (which has the same effect as voting against, given the way qualified majority voting works).

=== Second reading in Parliament ===
In June 2005, the legal affairs committee of the European Parliament discussed the directive and rejected plans for a complete overhaul of the directive. The vote by the committee took place on 21 June 2005, and narrowly decided not to substantially amend the Council version of the directive. According to the Financial Times, this "vote marks a turning point in the protracted battle over the law, which has split the software industry and sparked severe recriminations."

On 5 July 2005, the committee's report passed to a plenary session of Parliament for debate by all MEPs. On 6 July 2005, Parliament rejected the proposal by a very large majority (648 in favour of rejection, 14 against and 18 registered abstentions out of 729 total MEPs) without considering any of the other 175 proposed amendments. Under the codecision procedure, the legislative process ended with this rejection and the proposed directive did not become law in any form. This was the first and as of 2005 the only time a directive was ever rejected by Parliament at second reading.

The vote was the result of a compromise between the different parties: those in favour of software patents feared a text that would heavily limit its scope, while those against rejected the whole principle. Heavy defeat was the "least worst option" to both sides. In addition, some saw the defeat as an expression of Parliament's indignation about the handling of the proposal by the Council of the European Union and the European Commission as well as its concerns about the content of the proposal itself.

=== Consequences of the rejection ===
Parliament's decision to strike down the final draft has the effect that national laws will not be harmonised. National legislatures may continue to enact laws allowing patents on computer-implemented inventions, should they wish to do so, and national courts may enforce such laws. The European Patent Office, which is not legally bound by any EU directive but generally adapts its regulations to new EU law, has no reason or incentive to adapt its practice of granting patents on computer-implemented inventions under certain conditions, according to its interpretation of the European Patent Convention and its Implementing Regulations.

== Reactions ==
=== Supporters ===
Supporters of the proposed directive included Microsoft, IBM, Hewlett-Packard and the European Patent Office.

The European Information and Communication Technology Association (EICTA) stated that the directive "is extremely important for the future of innovation in Europe as it concerns two-thirds of all inventions in the European hi-tech industry". This position was characterised by opponents of software patents as "dominated by patent lawyers from the patent arms of large corporate members", "most of which qualifying as non-European companies" and "with a patent policy (...) tailored to the special interests of a few large corporations (...)". After the heavily modified draft directive was finally rejected, EICTA's Director General said, "This is a wise decision that has helped industry to avoid legislation that could have narrowed the scope of patent legislation in Europe. ... Parliament has today voted for the status quo, which preserves the current system that has served well the interests of our 10,000 member companies, both large and small."

=== Opponents ===
The proposal provoked public disagreement by diverse opponents of software patents, who argued that software patents were neither economically desirable nor mandated by international law. The FFII and the EuroLinux Alliance played key roles in co-ordinating this campaign, which drew support from some free software and open source programmers, some academics, some small business groups, and some proprietary software developers. Many of these organisations expressed concern over what they saw as abuses of the software patent system in the US, and argued that although some software patents might be beneficial, the net effect of the commission's proposals would be to suppress innovation and dampen legitimate competition. The opponents' campaign in its turn was characterised by supporters of the directive as "a small but highly organised and vocal lobby", with EICTA stating that "Those who depict the draft directive on the patentability of computer-implemented inventions as some sort of 'software patent law' are at best misinformed and at worst dishonest, malicious and disrespectful of the European democratic process".

Figures who have supported the campaign against software patents in Europe include Tim Berners-Lee, developer of the World Wide Web; Florian Müller, a free software lobbyist; the Computer & Communications Industry Association, a not for profit international tech trade association; and Linus Torvalds, creator of the Linux kernel. Politicians opposed to the directive included French MEP Michel Rocard.

== Aftermath ==
As the directive was rejected, pre-existing law has remained in place, and computer-implemented inventions are currently governed by Article 52 of European Patent Convention. Article 52 prohibits certain patents, including patents on programs for computers, but only as such. It is often interpreted by European Patent Office as well as by courts in EU countries, that invention should have technical character. For example, while a mathematical method is not patentable, the application of such method to electrical filter design would not usually be excluded from patentability by Article 52(2) and (3).

Final interpretation of the law in this area thus continues to be the responsibility of national courts, following national case-law (except when a European patent application is refused or when a European patent is revoked in opposition proceedings before the EPO, in which case the EPO has the final say regarding the interpretation of the EPC).

== See also ==
- Community patent
- Convention on the Unification of Certain Points of Substantive Law on Patents for Invention (Strasbourg Convention of 1963)
- Directive on the enforcement of intellectual property rights
- Directive on the patentability of biotechnological inventions
- Institutions of the European Union
- Software patent
- Software patents under the European Patent Convention
- Software patents under TRIPs Agreement
