= Dirk Hillbrecht =

German software developer and politician

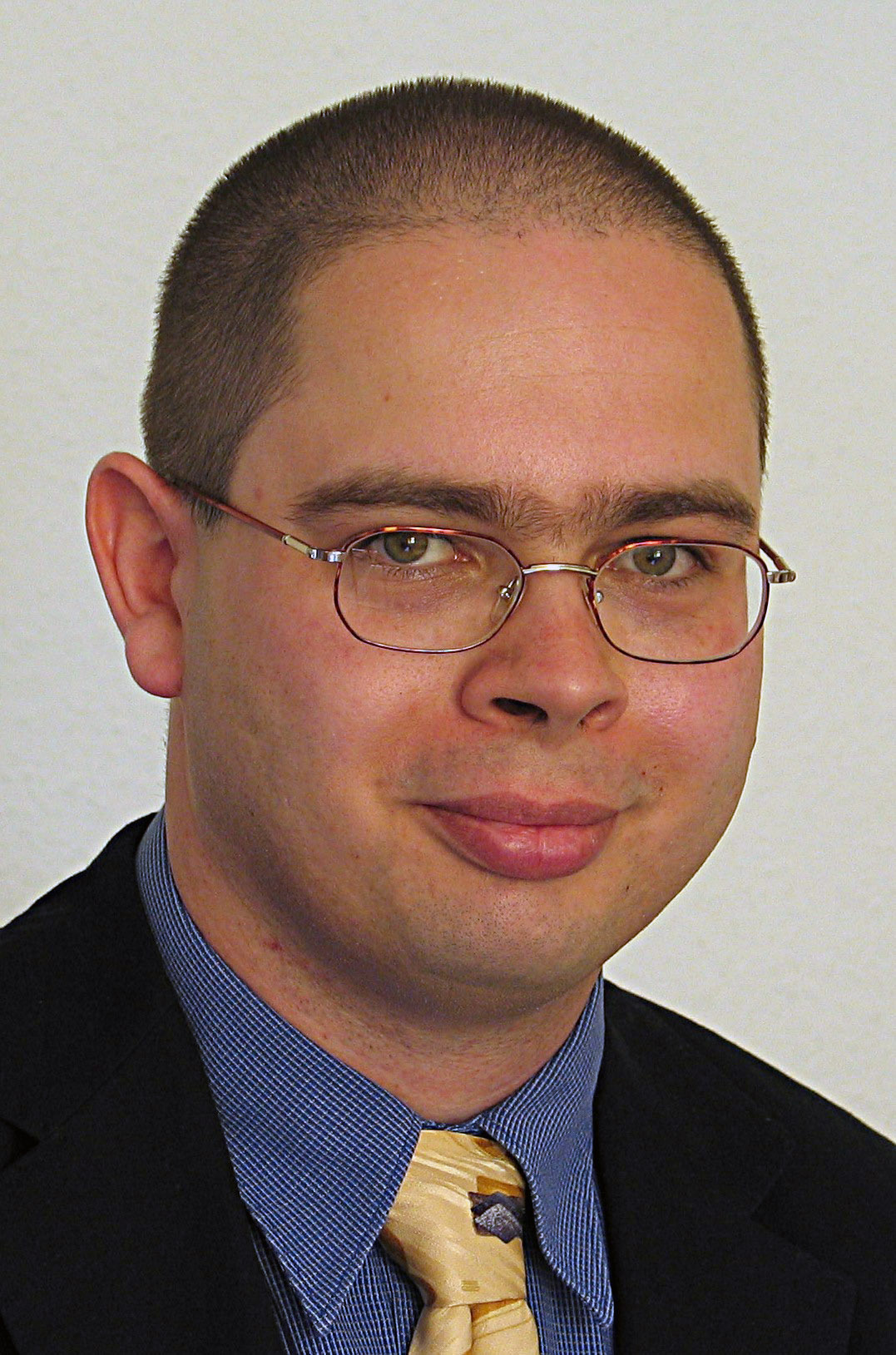
Dirk Hillbrecht

Dirk Hillbrecht (born 10 June 1972, Hannover) is a software developer and a former leader of the Pirate Party Germany.

He is also a campaigner against software patents, and regional contact for patentfrei.de in Niedersachsen.
