= EuroLinux =

Organisation that promotes open source software

EuroLinux is a campaigning organisation that promotes open source software / free software in Europe, and that are opposed to the European Union's proposals to introduce laws on software patents. It is also known as EuroLinux Alliance. It is not an umbrella organisation for Linux User Groups in Europe.

It describes itself as: "The EuroLinux Alliance for a Free Information Infrastructure is an open coalition of commercial companies and non-profit associations united to promote and protect a vigorous European Software Culture based on copyright, open standards, open competition and open source software such as Linux. Corporate members or sponsors of EuroLinux develop or sell software under free, semi-free and non-free licenses for operating systems such as Linux, Mac OS or Microsoft Windows."

Eurolinux organised the public EU campaign against software patents that was signed by more than 300,000 people. Members include FFII, April, AFUL, AEL, and European Linux user group (LUG) umbrella associations.

== See also ==
- European Information, Communications and Consumer Electronics Technology Industry Associations (EICTA)
