= Foundation for a Free Information Infrastructure =

German non-profit organisation

- Abbreviation: FFII
- Formation: 1999, Germany
- Type: Non-profit organization
- Legal status: Foundation
- Purpose: Law, Freedom, Privacy
- Headquarters: Munich, Germany
- Leader: Benjamin Henrion
- Volunteers: Over 1000
- Website: www.ffii.org

The Foundation for a Free Information Infrastructure (FFII) is a non-profit organisation based in Munich, Germany, dedicated to establishing a free market in information technology, by the removal of barriers to competition. The FFII played a key organisational role and was very active in the campaign which resulted in the rejection of the EU software patent directive in July 2005.

CNET awarded the FFII the Outstanding contribution to software development award for this work, which was the result of years of research, policy, and action. After the July 2005 victory, FFII has continued to defend a free and competitive software market by working towards adequate patent systems and open standards. Currently the FFII fights against software patents lobbies, not only in Europe but also in other parts of the world.

It was founded as a German registered association under the name Förderverein für eine Freie Informationelle Infrastruktur (FFII) e.V. in 1999 by developer and far-right politics activist Hartmut Pilch.

== Views ==
FFII's view is that software patents present a burden, not a benefit to society. It backs this position up citing extensive studies. FFII is a European NGO on this issue. Through its partnership with many other European organisations with the same goal, it has a reach across all nations of the EU.

FFII has been active on this front since 2000 when, according to the FFII, an attempt to change the European Patent Convention to legitimise software patents failed. In 2003, it strongly but indirectly lobbied the European Parliament against the proposed Directive on the patentability of computer-implemented inventions.

The EuroLinux anti-software-patent petition, supported and promoted by FFII, was signed by more than 1,500 SMEs, many thousand software developers, tens of thousands of software users system administrators as well as a number of scientists, academics and economists for a total of 400,000 signatories.

FFII organises conferences about the topic, usually in Brussels, such as the conference which took place on April 14, 2004 together with a demonstration of more than 400 people against software patents the one on November 9–10, 2004. In Karlsruhe, FFII organised a demonstration of about 1,000 people against software patents. In 2005 FFII organised an online demo supported by 1,200 web sites.

== Structure ==
The FFII was funded originally by donations from SuSE and Infomatec. The Open Society Institute has contributed regularly, as have Red Hat, and Stichting NLnet. The historical list of donors from 1999 to 2005 can be found on the FFII web site. Partners in Europe include EFFI, EuroLinux, FSF Europe, and SKOSI.

The FFII exists as a mother organisation with more or less formal chapters in many countries. The national FFII chapters (such as FFII France) handle national membership, media and lobbying, while the mother organisation operates at the EU level and in countries where there is no formal FFII organisation.

As of 14 December 2013, the FFII board consists of Benjamin Henrion (President), Rene Mages (Vice president), Stephan Uhlmann (Treasurer), André Rebentisch (Secretary), Hartmut Pilch.

== Campaigns ==
Besides software patents, FFII promotes various campaigns aimed at disencumbering computing and software development. These include supporting author's rights and Interoperability enforcements, such as working to improve copyright regulation by providing technical analysis, amendments and voting recommendations that may influence the European Parliament.

== See also ==
- Anti-Counterfeiting Trade Agreement
- EU Directive on the Patentability of Computer-Implemented Inventions
- European Information, Communications and Consumer Electronics Technology Industry Associations (EICTA)
- Software patent
- Software patent debate
