= T 258/03 =

T 258/03

Board of Appeal of the European Patent Office

Issued April 21, 2004
Board composition

Chairman: S. V. Steinbrener
Members: R. S. Wibergh, B. J. Schachenmann

Headwords

Auction method/HITACHI

T 258/03, also known as Auction Method/Hitachi, is a decision of a Technical Board of Appeal of the European Patent Office (EPO), issued on April 21, 2004. It is a landmark decision for interpreting Article 52(1) and (2) of the European Patent Convention (EPC) which built on the principles suggested by the same Board in T 641/00 (Comvik, Two identities). This decision, amongst others, but notably this one and T 641/00, significantly affected the assessment of an invention’s technical character and inventive step.

It mainly stated that "a method involving technical means [was] an invention within the meaning of Article 52(1) EPC" and in stating so contrasts with T 931/95 (Pension Benefit Systems Partnership), which held that "the mere fact that data processing and computing means, i.e. technical means, [were] recited in a method claim [did] not necessarily confer a technical character to the claimed method". T 258/03 put apparatus and method claims on an equal footing for the patentability examination of Article 52(2) EPC.

In other words, the Board of Appeal in this decision "pointed the way to the new test and argued that the term ‘invention’ in the definition of patentable inventions set out in Article 52(1) of the EPC was merely to be construed as ‘subject matter having technical character’. Thus, the presence of computer hardware in a claim to a business method, providing a technical character, would now be sufficient to overcome the business method objection, regardless of technical contribution."

== Reasoning on patentable subject-matter ==
The invention in the application under examination related to an "automatic Dutch auction method executed in a server computer".

The Board of Appeal first made it clear that:

1. there are four requirements to be fulfilled for some claimed subject-matter to be patented: "(1) it should be an "invention", and this invention must be (2) new, (3) inventive, and (4) industrially applicable", that
2. the term "invention" is to be construed as "subject-matter having technical character", and finally that
3. the "verification that claimed subject-matter is an invention within the meaning of Article 52(1) EPC" must be done before performing the three other tests, i.e. the novelty, the inventive step and the industrial applicability tests.

Consequently, and having regard to the structure of the EPC, the Board held that "it should be possible to determine whether subject-matter is excluded under Article 52(2) EPC without any knowledge of the state of the art (including common general knowledge)".

This approach confirmed that the Boards of Appeal of the EPO have abandoned the "contribution approach", which consisted in deciding whether a claimed subject-matter is an invention by deciding whether it brought forward a contribution to the art in a field non excluded from patentability, and therefore by inherently taking into account prior art during this first step.

The Board then confirmed the fact that a mixture of technical and non-technical feature may be patentable, and inferred that "a compelling reason for not refusing under Article 52(2) EPC subject-matter consisting of technical and non-technical features is simply that the technical features may in themselves turn out to fulfil all requirements of Article 52(1) EPC."

Therefore, an apparatus claim comprising clearly technical features such as a "server computer", "client computers" and a "network" is an invention within the meaning of Article 52(1) EPC (as held in T 931/95). But, the Board also held that the approach also applies to method claims, thus departing from T 931/95. The Board justified this with the following analysis:

"an assessment of the technical character of a method based on the degree of banality of the technical features of the claim would involve remnants of the contribution approach by implying an evaluation in the light of the available prior art or common general knowledge."

What may be viewed as general guidelines for the examination of patentable subject-matter under the EPC were then stated or confirmed:

"What matters having regard to the concept of "invention" within the meaning of Article 52(1) EPC is the presence of technical character which may be implied by the physical features of an entity or the nature of an activity, or may be conferred to a nontechnical activity by the use of technical means. Hence, (...), activities falling within the notion of a non-invention "as such" would typically represent purely abstract concepts devoid of any technical implications."

== Consequences ==
This "comparatively broad interpretation of the term "invention" in Article 52(1) EPC will include activities which are so familiar that their technical character tends to be overlooked, such as the act of writing using pen and paper." However, as the Board put it, "this does not imply that all methods involving the use of technical means are patentable. They still have to be new, represent a non-obvious technical solution to a technical problem, and be susceptible of industrial application."

== Reasoning on inventive step ==
Although the claims were held to be inventions within the meaning of Article 52(1), (2) and (3) EPC, they were found to lack inventive step. The application was refused.

More precisely, the invention was viewed as a mixture of technical and non-technical features, and was assessed with respect to the requirement of inventive step by taking account only the features which contributing to a technical character (in accordance with the principles of T 641/00). No step of the claimed method was found to be designed "in such a way as to be particularly suitable for being performed on a computer" so that it may have contribute in a technical manner to inventive step. A particular method step which may have been a candidate involving technical contribution was found by the Board to result from "a routine programming measure well within the reach of the skilled person".

== See also ==
- G 3/08, opinion of the Enlarged Board of Appeal
- List of decisions of the EPO Boards of Appeal relating to Article 52(2) and (3) EPC
- Software patents under the European Patent Convention
