= G 1/19 =

G 1/19

Enlarged Board of Appeal of the European Patent Office

ECLI:EP:BA:2021:G000119.20210310
Decision issued on 10 March 2021
Board composition

Chairman: Carl Josefsson
Members: Fritz Blumer, Gunnar Eliasson, Adem Aslan, Ingo Beckedorf, Tamàs Bokor, Andrea Ritzka

Headwords

Pedestrian simulation

G 1/19 is a decision issued by the Enlarged Board of Appeal of the European Patent Office (EPO) on 10 March 2021, which deals with the patentability of computer-implemented simulations.

== Background ==
The case, triggered by decision T 489/14 issued on 22 February 2019 by Board of Appeal 3.5.07, deals with a European patent application relating to "a computer-implemented method, computer program and apparatus for simulating the movement of a pedestrian crowd through an environment". "The main purpose of the simulation is its use in a process for designing a venue such as a railway station or a stadium". While Board 3.5.07 acknowledged the analogy with case T 1227/05 (Circuit simulation I/Infineon Technologies) (in which the specific mathematical steps involved in a computer-implemented simulation of an electrical circuit subject to noise were found to contribute to the technical character of the invention), which supported the applicant's case, the Board did not agree with the conclusion reached by the deciding Board in T 1227/05. Eventually, considering this to be a question of fundamental importance, Board 3.5.07 decided to refer three questions to the Enlarged Board of Appeal.

== The questions ==
The three questions referred to the Enlarged Board of Appeal are:

1. "In the assessment of inventive step, can the computer-implemented simulation of a technical system or process solve a technical problem by producing a technical effect which goes beyond the simulation's implementation on a computer, if the computer-implemented simulation is claimed as such?
2. If the answer to the first question is yes, what are the relevant criteria for assessing whether a computer-implemented simulation claimed as such solves a technical problem? In particular, is it a sufficient condition that the simulation is based, at least in part, on technical principles underlying the simulated system or process?
3. What are the answers to the first and second questions if the computer-implemented simulation is claimed as part of a design process, in particular for verifying a design?"

== Amicus curiae and oral proceedings ==
Oral proceedings took place before the Enlarged Board of Appeal on July 15, 2020. The oral proceedings were live streamed over the internet. Additionally, third parties were given the opportunity to file written statements after the initial referral to the Enlarged Board of Appeal, to be considered as part of these oral proceedings, resulting in the filing of 23 amicus curiae briefs.

== Decision ==
The Enlarged Board of Appeal held "that existing case law regarding computer-implemented inventions also applies to computer-implemented simulations", and it retained "its established approach in assessing inventive step, known as the COMVIK approach".

== See also ==
- G 3/08, referral relating to the patentability of programs for computers (referral held to be inadmissible for lack of divergent case law)
