= Uwe Scharen =

German judge

Presiding Judge of the Federal Court of Justice of Germany
- In office 1 April 2009 – 31 August 2010

Personal details
- Born: August 9, 1945 Rockenau, Germany
- Occupation: Jurist

Uwe Scharen (born 9 August 1945 in Rockenau, Germany) is a German jurist. He was presiding judge at the Federal Court of Justice of Germany (Bundesgerichtshof) from 1 April 2009 until his retirement on 31 August 2010.

After his legal education, Scharen started his career in 1974 in the senior justice service (German: Höherer Dienst) of the federal state of North Rhine-Westphalia. There, he was first judge on probation (German: Richter auf Probe) at the district court (German: Landgericht) of Düsseldorf, where he was also appointed judge in 1978. This was followed in 1984 by his appointment as judge at the Provincial Court of Appeal (German: Oberlandesgericht) of Düsseldorf, where he was assigned to a civil division (German: Zivilsenat) in charge of patent cases and competition law. In 1995 he was promoted as presiding judge of this court.

Only one year later, Scharen was appointed as judge at the Federal Court of Justice of Germany, where he was assigned to the 10th division (German: X. Zivilsenat), of which he was since 2004 the division's deputy. This division mainly handles patent law and public procurement cases. On 1 April 2009 Scharen was finally appointed chairman of this division by the President of Germany, on a proposal of the Presidium of the Federal Court of Justice. On 31 August 2010 he retired.
