= International Technology Law Association =

- Abbreviation: ITechLaw
- Formation: 1971
- Type: Non-profit legal association
- Purpose: technology-related legal issues
- Region served: Worldwide
- Formerly called: Computer Law Association

The International Technology Law Association (ITechLaw) is an international association that provides education and networking opportunities for technology professionals and students in the area of technology-related legal issues.

== About ==
Founded in 1971 and formally incorporated as a non-profit association in 1973, the International Technology Law Association (ITechLaw) is a worldwide organization representing lawyers and other professionals in the technology sector. The organization’s global membership spans six continents and embodies a broad spectrum of expertise.

In addition to serving as a forum for members to discuss a wide range of legal issues, the association regularly organizes conferences that explore cutting-edge issues and trends in both information technology and intellectual property law. ITechLaw is a non-profit organization partly supported by annual membership dues.

== History ==
ITechLaw was founded as the Computer Law Association. ITechLaw assumed its current name in 2006 to reflect its international membership and the convergence of computing technologies with other technology. In 2008, ITechLaw opened its membership beyond legal professionals to other professionals with an interest in technology law issues. A detailed history of the association can be found at the ITechLaw Web site.

== Activities ==
ITechLaw’s activities include hosting national and international conferences, workshops known as CyberspaceCamp and Webinars. The organization typically holds three conferences each year to accommodate attendance by members worldwide. In recent years, ITechLaw has held annual meetings in North America, Europe and Asia. Conferences are open to members and non-members.

ITechLaw also organizes periodic Webinars to discuss issues of interest to its membership. Recent Webinars have discussed topics including data security, the Computer Fraud and Abuse Act (CFAA), the Communications Decency Act (CDA) and the GNU General Public License (GPL) version 3. Attendance of Webinars is open to members and non-members.

== Publications ==
ITechLaw publishes a quarterly journal, the eBulletin, which discusses technology-related legal issues and recent court cases of interest. The eBulletin includes scholarly articles on timely issues relevant to technology lawyers, analyses of recent case law and with news and updates on the ITechLaw organization. An online archive is provided for members.

ITechLaw also publishes eNews, a monthly newsfeed about its members through which members also receive daily notices regarding updates about IT law.

== Organization ==
ITechLaw is managed by a board of directors along with an executive committee composed of elected officers. Information on Past Presidents and members of the ITechLaw Advisory Board can be found at its website.

== See also ==
- SEARCH, The National Consortium for Justice Information and Statistics
