= Software patents under TRIPs Agreement =

The WTO's Agreement on Trade-Related Aspects of Intellectual Property Rights (TRIPS), particularly Article 27, is occasionally referenced in the political debate on the international legal framework for the patentability of software, and on whether software and computer-implemented inventions should be considered as a field of technology.

== Article 27 of TRIPS ==
Article 27 paragraph 1 of TRIPS provides for that:

(...) patents shall be available for any inventions, whether products or processes, in all fields of technology, provided that they are new, involve an inventive step and are capable of industrial application. (...) patents shall be available and patent rights enjoyable without discrimination as to the place of invention, the field of technology and whether products are imported or locally produced.

The only allowable exceptions to this provision are laid down in paragraphs 2 and 3 of the same Article 27, and neither software nor computer programs are mentioned therein. The following elements may be excluded from patentability by WTO members under TRIPs:

- (...) inventions, the prevention within their territory of the commercial exploitation of which is necessary to protect ordre public or morality, including to protect human, animal or plant life or health or to avoid serious prejudice to the environment, provided that such exclusion is not made merely because the exploitation is prohibited by their law.(paragraph 2)
- diagnostic, therapeutic and surgical methods for the treatment of humans or animals; (paragraph 3(a)) and
- plants and animals other than micro-organisms, and essentially biological processes for the production of plants or animals other than non-biological and microbiological processes. (...) (paragraph 3(b)).

However, despite not being mentioned as an exception in paragraphs 2 and 3 of Article 27 TRIPs, 'pure software' is not considered an invention under European law. The decision of the contracting states of the TRIPS Agreement, i.e. the WTO member states, was that patents should be granted in all fields of technology, without discrimination (Art. 27(1) TRIPS). However, according to Paul Hartnack, former Comptroller-General of the UK Patent Office, it is arguable whether pure software is a technology, or is, in many cases, capable of industrial application. He argues that its acceptance as such under European jurisdiction would be a political matter based on economic interest.

Art. 31(1) of the Vienna Convention on the Law of Treaties requires "ordinary meaning to be given to the terms of the treaty". The same provision requires interpretation within the light of the object and purpose of the treaty.

There have been no dispute settlement procedures regarding software patents. Its relevance for patentability in the domains of, for example, computer-implemented business methods, computer science and software information technology remains uncertain, since the TRIPS agreement is subject to interpretation, like all legal texts.

== Relationship with copyright protection ==
Article 10 paragraph 1 of TRIPS provides that a computer program is a type of work which is eligible for protection under copyright law:

Computer programs, whether in source or object code, shall be protected as literary works under the Berne Convention (1971).

This argument was used by some adversaries of software patents to contend that software patents would not be allowed by the TRIPS agreement. TRIPS textbooks see no conflict, for instance Correa & Yusuf notes that software patents complement copyright because copyright does not protect underlying ideas.

== See also ==
- Aerotel v Telco and Macrossan's Application
- Proposed EU Directive on the patentability of computer-implemented inventions
- Idea-expression divide
