= AEL (motorcycle) =

Defunct motorcycle and accessories dealer in Coventry, England

- Type: Private
- Industry: Motorcycle manufacturing
- Founded: 1919
- Founder: Arthur Edward Lynes
- Defunct: 1924
- Headquarters: Coventry, England, United Kingdom
- Key people: Arthur Edward Lynes
- Products: Motorcycles

AEL was a motorcycle and accessories dealer in Coventry, England who assembled bikes between 1919 and 1924 using frames probably manufactured in Coventry. Engines ranged from 147cc to 348cc, and were provided by companies such as Villiers, JAP and Blackburne. The company was named after Arthur Edward Lynes, who had a factory at 38 Moor Street and an office/showroom in central Coventry.
