= Patentable subject matter =

Concept in patent law

Patentable, statutory or patent-eligible subject matter is subject matter of an invention that is considered appropriate for patent protection in a given jurisdiction. The laws and practices of many countries stipulate that certain types of inventions should be denied patent protection. Together with criteria such as novelty, inventive step or nonobviousness, utility (or industrial applicability), which differ from country to country, the question of whether a particular subject matter is patentable is one of the substantive requirements for patentability.

The problem of patentable subject matter arises usually in cases of biological and software inventions, and much less frequently in other areas of technology.

== Legislation ==
The subject-matter which is regarded as patentable as a matter of policy, and correspondingly the subject-matter which is excluded from patentability as a matter of policy, depends on the national legislation or international treaty.

=== Canada ===
According to the Canadian Intellectual Property Office (CIPO) patents may only be granted for physical embodiments of an idea, or a process that results in something that is tangible or can be sold. This excludes theorems and computer programs per se. However, business methods are patentable.

=== European Patent Convention ===
The European Patent Convention (EPC) does not provide positive guidance on what should be considered an invention for the purposes of patent law. However, it provides in Article 52(2) EPC a non-exhaustive list of what are not to be regarded as inventions, and therefore not patentable subject matter:

The following in particular shall not be regarded as inventions within the meaning of paragraph 1:

(a) discoveries, scientific theories and mathematical methods;
(b) aesthetic creations;
(c) schemes, rules and methods for performing mental acts, playing games or doing business, and programs for computers;
(d) presentations of information.

Article 52(3) EPC then qualifies Art. 52(2) EPC by stating:

The provisions of paragraph 2 shall exclude patentability of the subject-matter or activities referred to in that provision only to the extent to which a European patent application or European patent relates to such subject-matter or activities as such.

(In a previous version of the EPC, some further items were excluded under Article 52(4) EPC, as formally being not industrially applicable, notable medical methods as applied by a physician or a veterinarian. Nowadays these methods are excluded directly under Art. 53 EPC, together with other policy exclusions.)

==== Practice at the European Patent Office (EPO) ====
Under Article 52(1) EPC, "European patents shall be granted for any inventions, in all fields of technology, provided that they are new, involve an inventive step and are susceptible of industrial application." So, four questions need to be assessed:

1. Is there an invention?
2. Is the invention susceptible of industrial application?
3. Is the invention novel?
4. Does the invention involve an inventive step?

The first question "Is there an invention?" is equivalent to: "Is the claimed subject-matter as a whole within the realm of patentable subject-matter?" The invention question or patentable subject-matter question precedes the three further questions, which cannot, and need not, be assessed if there is no invention.

According to the case law of the Boards of Appeal of the EPO, the question "Is there an invention?" also implicitly implies the further question: "Does the claimed subject-matter have a technical character?" "Having technical character is an implicit requirement of the EPC to be met by an invention to be an invention within the meaning of Article 52(1) EPC".

Patentable subject-matter considerations also intervene again at a secondary level, during the inventive step assessment. In T 641/00 (Comvik/Two Identities), the Board held that, "An invention consisting of a mixture of technical and non-technical features and having technical character as a whole is to be assessed with respect to the requirement of inventive step by taking account of all those features which contribute to said technical character whereas features making no such contribution cannot support the presence of inventive step." The non-technical features are the ones that are excluded from the realm of patentable subject-matter as a matter of policy. T 258/03 (Hitachi/Auction Method) further developed this test for patentable subject-matter.

Under this test, a patent application or patent which does not provide a technical solution to a technical problem would be refused (under Article 97(1) EPC) or revoked (under Article 102(1) EPC) as lacking inventive step.

The EPO provides guidelines for evaluating the patent-eligibility of computer-implemented inventions (CII), such as in particular based on Artificial Intelligence (AI). For instance, AI-based image processing programs are considered technical and therefore patent-eligible. Conversely, AI-based text processing programs with a text classification only based on the content of the text are not considered technical. These are excluded from patentability because attaching meaning to words is a cognitive task and not a technical implementation.

==== Practice in the United Kingdom ====
Following the 2006 Court of Appeal judgment in Aerotel v Telco and Macrossan's application, which contains a lengthy discussion of case law in the area, the UKPO has adopted the following test:

(1) properly construe the claim
(2) identify the actual contribution
(3) ask whether it falls solely within the excluded subject matter
(4) check whether the actual or alleged contribution is actually technical in nature.

The Court decided that the new approach provided a structured and more helpful way of applying the statutory test for assessing patentability which was consistent with previous decisions of the Court.

This test is quite different from the test used by the EPO, as expressed in T 641/00 (Comvik/Two Identities) and T 258/03 (Hitachi/Auction Method), but it is considered that the end result will be the same in nearly every case.

=== United States ===
Patentable subject matter in the United States is governed by 35 U.S.C. 101. The two particularly contentious areas, with numerous reversals of prior legislative and judicial decisions, have been computer-based and biological inventions. The US practice of patentable subject matter is very different from that of the European Patent Office. Whereas the EPO adopted an exclusionary approach by denying patentability to specific types of inventions (discoveries, scientific theories and mathematical methods; aesthetic creations; schemes, rules and methods for performing mental acts, playing games or doing business, and programs for computers; presentations of information), the US Supreme Court in its Alice-Mayo framework proposed an inclusionary approach: instead of categorically excluding certain types of invention, an additional "inventive concept" is required to limit the scope of the patent claims to certain applications of a newly discovered algorithm or a law of nature.

There is an important relationship between patent eligibility and non-obviousness tests in the US patent law. The non-obviousness criterion can be easily met if a claim is based on a discovery of new natural phenomenon/principle/law. In the patentable subject matter analysis, however, this "discovery" is assumed to be prior art, and an "additional inventive concept" must be present in the claim.

Things (including living organisms and nucleic acids) found in nature are not patent-eligible (Funk Bros. Seed Co. v. Kalo Inoculant Co.) even, when isolated from their natural environment (e.g. a protein-encoding gene from a chromosome), but things (even alive) "made by man" may be (Diamond v. Chakrabarty, Association for Molecular Pathology v. Myriad Genetics, Inc.), provided that they are different in a useful manner from their natural predecessor(s).

In the case of computer-implemented methods, the algorithms (even new and non-obvious) per se are not patentable (Gottschalk v. Benson, Parker v. Flook), and an additional "inventive concept" is required to limit the algorithm to new and useful application(s) (Diamond v. Diehr).

== Legal controversies ==
The question of what should and should not be patentable subject matter has spawned a number of battlegrounds in recent years, setting against each other those in each area supporting patentability, claiming that patents would cause increased innovation and public good, against opponents with views that patentability is being sought only for private good but would do public harm.

Flashpoints have included the patenting of naturally occurring biological material, genetic sequences, stem cells, "traditional knowledge," programs for computers, and business methods.

== See also ==
- Computer programs and the Patent Cooperation Treaty
- Software patents under the European Patent Convention
- Software patents under TRIPs Agreement
- Software patents under United Kingdom patent law
