= Peter Prescott (barrister) =

Peter Richard Kyle Prescott KC (born 23 January 1943) is an Anglo-Argentine barrister and was a Deputy High Court Judge of England and Wales, and a specialist on the law of copyright.

He was educated at St George's College, Argentina, Dulwich College and University College London, where he gained a BSc, followed by an MSc from Queen Mary College.

He was called to the bar at Lincoln's Inn in 1970 and was made a bencher in 2001. As a Deputy High Court Judge, he has heard a variety of intellectual property cases, including CFPH LLC's Applications (2005), which sought to bring the United Kingdom practice concerning patentable subject matter more into line with that of the European Patent Office.

Prescott is regarded as one of the foremost authorities on copyright law in the United Kingdom. Laddie, Prescott and Vitoria - The Modern Law of copyright and Designs, a leading copyright text in the United Kingdom, bears his name alongside Sir Hugh Laddie and Mary Vitoria QC.
