= T 641/00 =

T 641/00
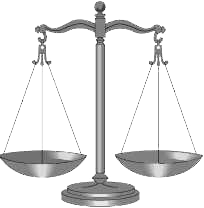

Board of Appeal of the European Patent Office

Issued September 26, 2002
Board composition

Chairman: S. V. Steinbrener
Members: S. C. Perryman, R. R. K. Zimmermann

Headwords

Two identities/COMVIK

T 641/00, also known as Two identities/COMVIK, is a decision of a Technical Board of Appeal of the European Patent Office (EPO), issued on September 26, 2002. It is a landmark decision regarding the patentable subject matter requirement and inventive step under the European Patent Convention (EPC). More generally, it is a significant decision regarding the patentability of business methods and computer-implemented inventions under the EPC.

The Board in T 641/00 held that:

An invention consisting of a mixture of technical and non-technical features and having technical character as a whole is to be assessed with respect to the requirement of inventive step by taking account of all those features which contribute to said technical character whereas features making no such contribution cannot support the presence of inventive step.

Non-technical aspects of an invention must be treated as constraints in the formulation of the objective technical problem in the context of the problem-solution approach, the approach which is generally applied by the EPO for assessing whether an invention involves an inventive step.

== Background ==
European patent EP 0579655 was granted on March 5, 1997, and related to a digital mobile telephone system using of a single-user multi-identity IC card (multi-identity SIM card). The patent was opposed and was revoked on lack of inventive step by the Opposition Division. The patent proprietor, Comvik GSM AB, appealed the revocation decision.

== Reasoning ==
The Board based its reasoning on the "problem-solution approach" "according to which an invention is to be understood as a solution to a technical problem". The "problem-solution approach" comprises and requires the following steps:

- an "identification of the technical field of the invention (which will also be the field of expertise of the person skilled in the art to be considered for the purpose of assessing inventive step),"
- an "identification of the closest prior art in this field",
- an "identification of the technical problem which can be regarded as solved in relation to this closest prior art, and
- an "assessment of whether or not the technical feature(s) which alone or together form the solution claimed, could be derived as a whole by the skilled person in that field in an obvious manner from the state of the art".

If no technical problem can be derived from the application, then an invention within the meaning of Article 52 EPC does not exist, and the claimed subject-matter is not patentable. Where a feature in the claim cannot be considered as contributing to the solution of any technical problem by providing a technical effect it has no significance for the purpose of assessing inventive step.

"[W]here the claim refers to an aim to be achieved in a nontechnical field, this aim may legitimately appear in the formulation of the [objective technical problem] as part of the framework of the technical problem that is to be solved, in particular as a constraint that has to be met." The technical professional or skilled person would, in a realistic situation, receive knowledge of the features which do not as such make a contribution to the technical character of the invention (the non-technical features) as part of the task information given to him (the objective technical problem). In other words, it is permissible to include non-technical features into the formulation of the technical problem, so that they cannot support a finding of inventive step.

"The skilled person [is] an expert in a technical field. If the technical problem is concerned with a computer implementation of a business, actuarial or accountancy system, the skilled person [is] someone skilled in data processing, and not merely a business man, actuary or accountant."

Based on this reasoning, the Board considered that the invention as claimed in the patent did not meet the requirement of inventive step and upheld the opposition decision to revoke the patent.

== Interpretation ==
On June 2, 2006, the Board in decision T 928/03 ("Video game/KONAMI") interpreted the Comvik decision. It held that applying the approach of T 641/00 in a fair manner, i.e. treating non-technical aspects as constraints in the formulation of the technical problem, must bear in mind its purpose: on the one hand, the approach is to make sure that non-technical aspects do not support a finding of inventiveness; on the other hand, actual contributions to the technical character by any feature of an invention must be taken into account when assessing inventive step.

== See also ==
- List of decisions of the EPO Boards of Appeal relating to Article 52(2) and (3) EPC
- Software patents under the European Patent Convention
