= Association Electronique Libre =

Association Electronique Libre (AEL) ASBL-VZW
- Abbreviation: AEL
- Formation: 2001, Belgium
- Type: Non-profit organization
- Legal status: ASBL
- Purpose: Law, Freedom, Privacy
- Headquarters: Belgium
- Website: www.ael.be

The Association Electronique Libre (AEL, sometimes written Association électronique libre) is a Belgian non-profit digital rights advocacy and legal organization based in Belgium. Its stated mission is to "protecting the fundamental rights in the information society". It is promoting the Free Software Pact Initiative.

It has organized protests against the concept of software patents.
