= Software patents under the European Patent Convention =

The patentability of software, computer programs and computer-implemented inventions under the European Patent Convention (EPC) is the extent to which subject matter in these fields is patentable under the Convention on the Grant of European Patents of October 5, 1973. The subject also includes the question of whether European patents granted by the European Patent Office (EPO) in these fields (sometimes called "software patents") are regarded as valid by national courts.

Under the EPC, and in particular its Article 52, "programs for computers" are not regarded as inventions for the purpose of granting European patents, but this exclusion from patentability only applies to the extent to which a European patent application or European patent relates to a computer program as such. As a result of this partial exclusion, and despite the fact that the EPO subjects patent applications in this field to a much stricter scrutiny when compared to their American counterpart, that does not mean that all inventions including some software are de jure not patentable.

== Article 52 of the European Patent Convention ==
The European Patent Convention (EPC), Article 52, paragraph 2, excludes from patentability, in particular

1. discoveries, scientific theories and mathematical methods;
2. aesthetic creations;
3. schemes, rules and methods for performing mental acts, playing games or doing business, and programs for computers; [emphasis added]
4. presentations of information.

Paragraph 3 then says:

The provisions of paragraph 2 shall exclude patentability of the subject-matter or activities referred to in that provision only to the extent to which a European patent application or European patent relates to such subject-matter or activities as such." [emphasis added]

The words "as such" have caused patent applicants, attorneys, examiners, and judges a great deal of difficulty since the EPC came into force in 1978. The Convention, as with all international conventions, should be construed using a purposive approach. However, the purpose behind the words and the exclusions themselves is far from clear.

One interpretation, which is followed by the Boards of Appeal of the EPO, is that an invention is patentable if it provides a new and non-obvious "technical" solution to a technical problem. The problem, and the solution, may be entirely resident within a computer such as a way of making a computer run faster or more efficiently in a novel and inventive way. Alternatively, the problem may be how to make the computer easier to use, such as in T 928/03.

== Patentability under European Patent Office case law ==
Like the other parts of the paragraph 2, computer programs are open to patenting to the extent that they provide a technical contribution to the prior art. In the case of computer programs and according to the case law of the Boards of Appeal, a technical contribution typically means a further technical effect that goes beyond the normal physical interaction between the program and the computer.

Though many argue that there is an inconsistency on how the EPO now applies Article 52, the practice of the EPO is fairly consistent regarding the treatment of the different elements of Article 52(2). A mathematical method is not patentable, but an electrical filter designed according to this method would not be excluded from patentability by Article 52(2) and (3).

According to the jurisprudence of the Boards of Appeal of the EPO, a technical effect provided by a computer program can be, for example, a reduced memory access time, a better control of a robotic arm or an improved reception and/or decoding of a radio signal. It does not have to be external to the computer on which the program is run; reduced hard disk access time or an enhanced user interface could also be a technical effect.

=== First hurdle: patentable subject-matter requirement ===
As of 2013, the criterion used for distinguishing "inventions" from "non-inventions" at the EPO, i.e. the patent eligibility requirement at the EPO, is that the subject-matter must have a technical character. Whether the subject-matter has a technical character is assessed without reference to the prior art. According to Stefan Steinbrener, former chairman of an EPO Technical Board of Appeal, this means that:

Any of the subject-matter listed in Article 52(2) EPC may comprise an invention if it has technical character or contributes to it (in particular because a technical problem is solved by using technical means or a technical effect is achieved, technical interactions occur or technical adaptations are effected, in other words: if such subject-matter lends itself to a technical application)."

Some ten years before 2006, a shift occurs in the case law. The "contribution approach" or "technical effect approach", used to assess what was regarded as an invention within the meaning of Art. 52(1) and (2), was abandoned. According to the "contribution approach" (see for instance T 52/85), the claimed subject-matter did not concern an invention within the meaning of Article 52(1) EPC when no contribution was made in a field not excluded from patentability. The "contribution approach" was a disguised inventive step assessment.

Decisions such as T 258/03 and T 154/04 have made it clear that the contribution approach was no longer applicable. Indeed

The structure of the EPC (...) suggests that it should be possible to determine whether subject-matter is excluded under Article 52(2) EPC without any knowledge of the state of the art (including common general knowledge). (T 258/03, Reasons 3.1). It now suffices that a physical entity or activity involves technical means to be considered as an invention within the meaning of Article 52(1) EPC. Having technical character is an implicit requisite of an "invention" within the meaning of Article 52(1) EPC (requirement of "technicality").

But the patentable subject matter test of Article 52(2) and (3) is only the first step towards patentability, the first hurdle. Computer programs can also be refused and are often refused on the ground of lack of inventive step. This is the second hurdle, which should not mixed up with the first hurdle. As a Board of appeal put it in T 258/03 (Reasons 4.6) in relation to the fact that the "contribution approach" was no longer applicable,

[we are] aware that [our] comparatively broad interpretation of the term "invention" in Article 52(1) EPC will include activities which are so familiar that their technical character tends to be overlooked, such as the act of writing using pen and paper. Needless to say, however, this does not imply that all methods involving the use of technical means are patentable. They still have to be new, represent a non-obvious technical solution to a technical problem, and be susceptible of industrial application.

The technical character requirements relating to the first hurdle is now a formal requirement. In other words, it is a simple test that is related to the language used in the patent claim. Acceptable software patent claims can meet the first hurdle by starting with "computer-implemented method for..." or "system configured to...".

=== Second hurdle: inventive step requirement ===
The interpretation of the term "invention" in the patentable subject-matter test, as used by the Boards of Appeal, has come with an adjustment of the case law relating to the inventive step requirement.

Any non-technical feature, i.e. a feature from a field excluded from patentability under Article 52(2) and (3) EPC, cannot be taken into account for the assessment of inventive step, unless they (the non-technical features) do interact with the technical subject-matter to solve a technical problem. Assessing whether or not a feature contributes to the technical character of a claim has been viewed as difficult.

Furthermore, the "state of the art" (used as the starting point for the inventive step assessment) should be construed as meaning the "state of technology", the person skilled in the art is the person skilled in the relevant field of technology, and "for the purpose of the problem-and-solution approach, the problem must be a technical problem which the skilled person in the particular technical field might be asked to solve at the relevant priority date". Fields excluded under Art. 52(2) are not considered part of the technology for the assessment of inventive step.

Thus an expert in marketing or insurance policies for instance cannot be chosen as the fictional person skilled in the art, while a computer hardware or memory management expert may be chosen as the reference fictional person. This means that the mere implementation of a business method on a computer or computer network rarely involves an inventive step, while improving a computer-assisted industrial process or providing a more efficient memory management within a computer may involve an inventive step.

The case law of the EPO Boards of Appeal is not binding on the first instance departments of the EPO (i.e. the Examining Divisions), and different Examining Divisions of the EPO may assess patentability differently. Likewise, during an opposition procedure before the EPO, where the grant of a recently granted European patent may be opposed by a third party (opponent), the patent may be revoked if the Opposition Division form a different view on whether or not the invention in question was patentable.

The practice for assessing the technical character for the second hurdle in the EPO is described in the Guidelines for Examination, which provides specific examples in the field of artificial intelligence and machine learning. To meet the second hurdle, a software invention needs to present a "technical application". This application is the purpose of the invention as defined in the patent claim, establishing a connection between a technical limitation of the patent claim and the technical purpose of the invention.

== Enforceability before national courts ==
The case law of the EPO Boards of Appeal is not binding on the EPO member states and different national courts acting on different cases may take a different view of patentability under Art. 52(2) EPC. The decision of EPO (directly or in appeal proceedings) not to a grant a European patent can however not be challenged in national courts. Any European patent issued by the EPO may be revoked in a patent infringement lawsuit or revocation proceedings before a national court if for instance the court judges the invention as non-patentable in view of new prior art evidence or in view of a reconsideration of the available prior art. Furthermore, member states have certain degree of freedom regarding exceptions: the extent to which another party may use a patent, for example to decompile software that would otherwise infringe a European patent.

=== United Kingdom ===
Peter Prescott QC, while sitting as a Deputy Judge in the UK High Court, and in consideration of CFPH's applications noted that the EPO decisions are prescriptive, but not binding on the UK courts, but also recalled the judgment of the Court of Appeal in Fujitsu's application which stated that it would be disastrous if there was any substantial divergence between the interpretations given by the UK courts and the EPO to Article 52(2) EPC.

The judgement in CFPH's applications was the first in a flurry of UK court cases since 2005 involving re-consideration by the High Court of patent applications refused by the UK Patent Office.

The two patent applications in question both involved networked interactive wagering on the outcomes of events. Each application was refused as relating to a method of doing business as such. The applications were not refused as relating to a computer program as such, because the computer program was simply a tool that was being used to implement a new set of business rules and the invention was not really about the computer program. Although the judgement stressed that the reasoning used was quite different from the type that would have been applied by the EPO, the judge was satisfied that the EPO would have come to the same conclusion using their own reasoning.

The decision criticises the EPO's reliance on insisting that an invention must provide a technical contribution, and not merely a business based contribution. As evidenced by the judgment in Dyson v Hoover the commercial background to an invention may help to show that a certain technical advance was or was not obvious.

In Research In Motion UK Ltd. v Inpro Licensing SARL, the UK High Court had the opportunity to consider a patent that had been granted by the EPO. The patent involved the 'pretreating' of web pages before they were downloaded to machines of modest processing capacity. Mr Justice Pumfrey came to the conclusion that the claimed invention was obvious, but specifically rejected the allegation that it was excluded from patent protection as a computer program as such. He noted that "all modern industry depends upon programmed computers, and one must be astute not to defeat patents on the ground that the subject matter is excluded under Article 52 unless the invention lies in excluded subject matter as such" (emphasis added).

The UK Court of Appeal judgment in Aerotel v Telco and Macrossan's Application criticised EPO practice to deem non-technical subject matter, such as new music or a story, as part of the prior art as not being intellectually honest. The EPO Boards of Appeal have since responded by saying that the technical effect approach (with the rider) applied in the Aerotel/Macrossan judgement is irreconcilable with the European Patent Convention.

=== Germany ===
In Germany, in the case Logikverifikation (13 December 1999), the German Federal Court (German: Bundesgerichtshof or BGH) ruled on a case involving a national patent application claiming a computer-implemented invention, namely a "method for hierarchical logic verification of highly-integrated circuits". Going against the run of previous case law, it overruled the German Federal Patent Court (German: Bundespatentgericht or BPatG), and came to the conclusion that the claimed subject-matter did properly meet the 'technical' requirement, can not be excluded from patentability for that reason and that the court has to go into substantial examination. The question about the exclusion of "computer programs as such"(sic) was mentioned the first time, but set aside as the court did not see the need to determine that question.

BPatG objections were also overruled in the decisions Sprachanalyseeinrichtung (German BGH, 11 May 2000) and Suche fehlerhafter Zeichenketten (German BGH, 17 October 2001). In the civil law tradition of mainland Europe however, legal precedent does not necessarily acquire the same formally binding character that it assumes in the common law traditions typical of most English-speaking countries.

In fact, more recently the same court has repeatedly upheld the rejection of patent claims to computers and programs operating thereon, as in Rentabilitätsermittlung as well as in Informationsübermittlungsverfahren.

=== France ===
France was the first European nation that excluded "les programmes ou séries d'instructions pour le déroulement des opérations d'une machine calculatrice" ("programs or series of instructions for the procession of operations of a calculating machine", i.e. computer programs) from being an industrial invention in 1968 in Loi n°68-1 Article 7. Two relevant decisions, namely Mobil Oil Corp., and SA SAGEM, rejected the patentability for the reason of missing a technical character. In Schlumberger, it was determined that a patent cannot be invalidated only because it uses a computer program as part of the technical process. In Infomil, the court declared that a claim for an information system always has technical character and is therefore patentable.

=== Unified Patent Court ===
The Unified Patent Court is a court common to several member states of the European Union, including Germany, France and Italy. It has jurisdiction regarding European patents as any national court would do. With the entry into force of the Unified Patent Court Agreement, patent proprietors also have the possibility to request unitary effect for European patents: which means that the European patent after grant will be regarded a single undividable patent for those EU countries that participate. For the latter patents, the Unified Patent Court will generally have exclusive competence. Regarding software, Article 27k of the Unified Patent Court Agreement allows decompiling of software, even without the consent of the patent owner.

Groups opposed to software patents have argued that the proposed Unified Patent Court may have strong ties to the patent industry. They assume therefore it allows software patents to be enforced despite rules that forbid them – such as explicitly allowing decompiling of software protected by patents in the Unified Patent Court Agreement – and failed attempts by the European Parliament to bring those provisions under EU law rather than under Unified Patent Court law.

== Referral to the Enlarged Board of Appeal ==
Under Article 112(1)(b) EPC, the President of the EPO has the power to refer a point of law to an Enlarged Board where two Boards of Appeal have given different decisions on that question.

On 27 October 2006, in its judgment in Aerotel v Telco and Macrossan's Application, the Court of Appeal of England and Wales said (at para. 25) that "The decisions of the EPO Boards of Appeal [in this software patentability area] are mutually contradictory" and (also at para. 25) that "surely the time has come for matters to be clarified by an Enlarged Board of Appeal". And even though the English Court of Appeal went on to say (at para. 25) that it "is formally no business of ours to define questions to be asked of an Enlarged Board of Appeal", it went on to suggest (at para. 76) questions which it thought that the President of the EPO may refer to an EPO Enlarged Board of Appeal.

In response, Alain Pompidou, then president of the EPO, is reported to have said that the EPO was very interested in developments in the case law of national courts and that he had "taken note of the UK decision, but a decision on whether or not it would be opportune to follow the suggestions for a referral has not yet been taken." Subsequently, however, it appears that Alain Pompidou wrote a letter dated 22 February 2007 to Lord Justice Jacob of the Court of Appeal of England and Wales (with a copy to the United Kingdom Patent Office) advising that he has "decided that at the moment there is an insufficient legal basis for a referral under Article 112(1)(b)", and that "the appropriate moment for a referral would be where the approach taken by one Board of Appeal would lead to the grant of a patent whereas the approach taken by another Board would not".

Subsequently, the Board in decision T 154/04 refused to refer questions "explicitly taken from the questions proposed for referral to the Enlarged Board of Appeal in the 'Aerotel/Macrossan' judgement" to the Enlarged Board of Appeal.

Eventually, on 22 October 2008, the then President of the EPO, Alison Brimelow, referred a point of law to the Enlarged Board of Appeal. The questions which were the subject of the referral related to the patentability of programs for computers under the European Patent Convention (EPC) and were, according to the President of the EPO, of fundamental importance as they related to the definition of "the limits of patentability in the field of computing." The referral had been quoted as relating to the "deeply contentious question about how to assess the patentability of software-related inventions". In May 2010 however, the Enlarged Board of Appeal considered the referral to be inadmissible because, in their opinion, no divergent decisions had been identified in the referral.

== Directive on the patentability of computer-implemented inventions ==
Proposed in 2002, one motivation at least for the controversial draft EU Directive on the Patentability of Computer-Implemented Inventions was to have been to establish common practice for the national courts; and, in cases of doubt as to its interpretation, to have created a requirement for national courts of last instance to seek a ruling from the European Court of Justice. Even though Switzerland for instance is a member of the European Patent Organisation but not a member of the European Union, the EPO also signalled that it would have been likely to adjust its practice, if necessary, to conform with whatever text had finally emerged from the EU legislative procedure,

However, the directive became highly controversial, drawing increasing legislative notoriety to this area of European law. Proponents of the Directive claimed its purpose was to clarify the meaning of Article 52, by consolidating existing EPO practice. Opponents claimed the Directive would dismantle perceived more stringent restrictions against software patenting employed or employable by national courts, and lead to an increased assertion of patents on software Union-wide across the EU. After a history of procedural wrangling, and sustained lobbying and publicity efforts from both sides, the Directive, which had largely been supported by the European Commission and most member-state governments in contrast with their national parliaments, was overwhelmingly rejected by the European Parliament on 6 July 2005, terminating the legislative procedure.

This failure to reform the exclusion of software followed the failed attempt to delete programs for computers from Art. 52(2)(c) of the convention in 2000 at the diplomatic conference in Munich. At the time the reform was explicitly derogated in order to await the outcome of the consultation process for this EU Directive.

Final interpretation of the law in this area thus continues to be the responsibility of national courts, following national case-law (except when a European patent application is refused or when a European patent is revoked in opposition proceedings before the EPO, in which case the EPO has the final say regarding the interpretation of the EPC). A decisive supra-national authority for European patent law cases could be created under either proposals for the European Union patent or the Unified Patent Court.

== Statistics ==
According to a European Commission press release of 2002, "since the EPC came into force in 1978, at least 30,000 patents for computer-implemented inventions have already been issued [by the EPO]".

== See also ==
- G 1/19, pending referral dealing with the patentability of computer-implemented simulations
