= DigitalEurope =

Trade association representing major European tech companies

DIGITALEUROPE
- Formation: 1999; 27 years ago
- Type: Trade association
- Headquarters: Brussels, Belgium.
- Products: Lobbying, logos, self-regulatory
- Director General: Cecilia Bonefeld Dahl
- Website: www.digitaleurope.org
- Formerly called: European Information and Communications Technology Industry Association (EICTA)

DigitalEurope (stylized as DIGITALEUROPE) is a European trade association located in Brussels, Belgium, that represents the information technology industry.

Members include 120 technology companies and 41 national trade associations. It seeks to ensure industry participation in the development and implementation of EU policies" and has several working groups that focus on different aspects of policy—environment, trade, technical and regulatory and the digital economy.

== History ==
The organization was founded in 1999 as the European Information and Communications Technology Industry Association (EICTA) by consolidating two former European organizations, ECTEL and EUROBIT, which represented the information and telecommunications industries. EICTA expanded its scope to include the consumer electronics industry; on October 1, 2001, the association merged with the European Association of Consumer Electronics Manufacturers (EACEM). The new joint association changed its name to the European Information, Communications and Consumer Electronics Technology Industry Association (but kept its original acronym, EICTA).

On March 12, 2009, EICTA rebranded as DIGITALEUROPE. Overtime, its membership has expanded to include vertical industries such as healthcare, finance and manufacturing.

== Logos ==
It previously developed the industry standards related to high-definition televisions.

On September 5, 2014, DIGITALEUROPE released an Ultra HD TV logo to certify companies that meet their technical requirements. The technical requirements for the Ultra HD logo is that the display must have a resolution of at least 3840×2160, a video signal path that does not reduce the resolution, a minimum color space of Rec. 709, and HDMI input that supports HDCP 2.2 content protection.

== Policy positions ==
In November 2014, it published a paper called "Law Enforcement Access to Data in the European Cloud" that asks the European Commission to "consider filing an amicus brief" with a U.S. appellate court regarding Microsoft's legal challenge of a U.S. warrant for a Microsoft user's private emails. As DIGITALEUROPE sees it, the fact that the data requested is stored on servers located in Dublin, Ireland, means that U.S. authorities should use mutual legal assistance treaties rather than strong-arming a U.S. multinational, which raises concerns about national sovereignty.

In anticipation to the publication of Neelie Kroes's Digital Agenda, DigitalEurope released a paper in May 2010 about Europe's digital future which was called A Transformational Agenda for the Digital Age DigitalEurope's Vision 2020.

== Members ==
- 4iG Plc.
- Accenture
- Airbus
- Applied Materials
- Amazon
- AMD
- Apple
- Arm
- Assent Compliance
- Autodesk
- Avery Dennison
- Banco Santander
- Bayer
- Beko
- BMW
- Bosch
- Bose
- Bristol-Myers Squibb
- Brother
- Canon
- Capgemini
- CaixaBank
- Cisco
- CyberArk
- Danfoss
- Dassault Systèmes
- Datev
- Dell
- EATON
- Epic Systems
- Epson
- Ericsson
- ESET
- Ernst & Young
- Fujitsu
- Garmin
- GSK plc
- Google
- Hewlett Packard Enterprise
- Hitachi
- Honeywell
- HP
- Huawei
- ING
- Intel
- Intuit
- Johnson & Johnson
- Johnson Controls
- Konica Minolta
- Kyocera
- Lenovo
- Lexmark
- LG Electronics
- LSEG
- Mastercard
- Meta
- Microsoft
- Mitsubishi Electric Europe
- Motorola Solutions
- MSD
- NEC
- Nemetschek
- NetApp
- Nintendo
- Nokia
- Nvidia
- OKI
- Oppo
- Oracle
- Palo Alto
- Panasonic Europe
- Pearson
- Philips
- Pioneer
- Qualcomm
- RedHat
- RELX
- ResMed
- Ricoh
- Roche
- Rockwell Automation
- Samsung
- SAP
- SAS
- Schneider Electric
- Sharp
- Siemens
- Siemens Energy
- Siemens Healthineers
- Skillsoft
- Sky
- Sony
- Sopra Steria
- Swatch Group
- Tesla
- Texas Instruments
- TikTok
- Toshiba
- TP Vision
- United Health Group
- Vantiva
- Visa
- Vivo
- VMWare
- Waymo
- Workday
- Xiaomi
- Xerox
- Zoom

Source: "Corporate Members". DigitalEurope.

=== National trade associations ===
National Associations	Country
Internet Offensive Österreich	Austria
AGORIA	Belgium
Hrvatska Gospodarska Komora (HGK)	Croatia
Cyprus Information Enterprises Association (CITEA)	Cyprus
Association for Applied Research in IT (AAVIT)	Czech Republic
Dansk Erhverv	Denmark
IT Branchen	Denmark
DI Digital	Denmark
ITL	Estonia
TIF	Finland
AFNUM	France
Numeum	France
Secimavi	France
BITKOM	Germany
ZVEI	Germany
SEPE	Greece
IVSZ	Hungary
Technology Ireland	Ireland
Anitec-Assinform	Italy
INFOBALT	Lithuania
APSI	Luxembourg
Moldovan Association of ICT Companies	Moldova
FIAR	Netherlands
NLdigital	Netherlands
Abelia	Norway
KIGEIT	Poland
PIIT	Poland
ZIPSEE	Poland
AGEFE	Portugal
ANIS	Romania
ITAS	Slovakia
GZS	Slovenia
AMETIC	Spain
Adigital	Spain
Teknikföretagen	Sweden
TechSverige	Sweden
SWICO	Switzerland
Digital Turkey Platform	Turkey
ECID	Turkey
IT UKRAINE	Ukraine
TechUK	United Kingdom
