= Inventive step under the European Patent Convention =

Concept in patent law

Under the European Patent Convention (EPC), European patents shall be granted for inventions which among other things involve an inventive step. The central legal provision explaining what this means, i.e. the central legal provision relating to the inventive step under the EPC, is Article 56 EPC. That is, an invention, having regard to the state of the art, must not be obvious to a person skilled in the art. The Boards of Appeal of the European Patent Office (EPO) have developed an approach, called the "problem-and-solution approach", to assess whether an invention involves an inventive step.

== General approach: the problem-and-solution approach ==
The Examining Divisions, Opposition Divisions, and Boards of Appeal of the EPO predominantly (Note: An exception among the numerous decisions of the Boards of Appeal that have applied the "problem-and-solution approach" is T 465/92 (Aluminium alloys) of 14.10.1994. Its headnote reads: "The "problem and solution approach" is no more than one possible route for the assessment of inventiveness. Accordingly, its use is not a sine qua non when deciding inventiveness under Article 56 EPC." See also T 1621/21 25-05-2023, reasons 2.1, fourth paragraph: "(...) the use of the problem-solution approach is not mandatory because it is not always reasonably applicable (...)".) apply the "problem-and-solution approach" (also called "problem-solution approach") to assess and decide whether an invention involves an inventive step. One of the first EPO decisions to develop the "problem-solution approach" as an objective way of deciding whether a claimed invention involves an inventive step was T 24/81.

The problem-solution approach essentially consists in three steps:

1. identifying the closest prior art, i.e. the most relevant piece of prior art or a suitable starting point for assessing inventive step, and determining the difference(s) between the invention and the closest prior art;
2. determining the technical effect brought about by the difference(s), and that defines the objective technical problem (namely, in the view of the closest prior art, the technical problem which the claimed invention addresses and successfully solves); and
3. examining whether or not the claimed solution to the objective technical problem is obvious for the skilled person in view of the state of the art in general.

=== Closest prior art, or appropriate starting point ===
This first step of the problem-solution approach consists in selecting the most promising starting point from which a skilled person could have arrived at the claimed invention. In other words, the most promising springboard towards the invention is to be determined. This public piece of prior art is called the closest prior art, which is supposed to be "nearer the invention than any other cited piece of prior art." The expression "appropriate starting point" is probably more relevant since the inventive assessment could in fact be started from more than one piece of prior art. Indeed, there is no requirement to select a unique piece of prior art as starting point and stick with that piece of prior art. The problem-solution approach may need to be conducted from different starting points.

The closest prior art need not necessarily be a document. The closest prior art can arise from a public prior use. Indeed, "features rendered available to the public by [a] public prior use ... can be considered as the closest state of the art." The notional person skilled in the art is assumed to be aware of the totality of the prior art pertinent to the relevant area of technology and in particular of everything made available to the public within the meaning of Article 54(2) EPC.

=== Objective technical problem (task to be addressed by the fictional skilled person) ===
The second step is to determine the objective technical problem, i.e., determining, in the light of the closest prior art, the technical problem, or task (German: Aufgabe), which the claimed invention addresses and successfully solves. This implies determining the feature(s) distinguishing the claimed subject-matter from the closest prior art, determining the technical effect(s) of the distinguishing feature(s), and finally the objective technical problem, or task, is how to adapt or modify the closest prior art to obtain the identified technical effect. The objective technical problem has to be formulated in such a manner that it does not contain pointers to the solution. In other words, the technical problem has to be formulated without including therein a part of a solution provided by the invention. Otherwise, this would result in an ex post facto assessment of inventive step, i.e. an assessment made with hindsight.

The problem used for the problem-solution approach need not be identical to the one originally mentioned in the patent application. The problem may be reformulated, at least to a certain extent, if necessary.

Any alleged technical effect that would be brought about by the differences between the claimed invention and the closest prior art must be proved, otherwise the problem must be reformulated, as mentioned above. Providing experimental data in the application as filed is not necessarily required however, if "the technical problem underlying the invention was at least plausibly solved at the filing date". "Alleged advantages to which the patent proprietor/applicant merely refers, without offering sufficient evidence to support the comparison with the closest prior art, cannot be taken into consideration in determining the problem underlying the invention and therefore in assessing inventive step". A technical effect must be credibly obtained "throughout the entire range covered by the claims" for it to be relied upon in defining the objective technical problem, i.e. it must be credible that the problem is effectively solved over the whole claimed range.

If the claimed subject-matter provides a different solution to a known problem, i.e. a problem that the prior art already solves, the objective technical problem may be formulated as how to provide an alternative solution to the known problem. Indeed, "[a]n earlier solution to a given technical problem does not preclude later attempts to solve the same problem in another, non-obvious way [...]".

=== Solution to the objective technical problem, and whether the subject-matter is obvious ===
The last step of the problem-solution approach is conducted according to the "could-would approach". Pursuant to this approach, the question to address in order to assess whether the invention involves an inventive step is the following (the question is the climax of the problem-solution approach):

Is there any teaching in the prior art, as a whole, that would, not simply could, have prompted the skilled person, faced with the objective technical problem formulated when considering the technical features not disclosed by the closest prior art, to modify or adapt said closest prior art while taking account of that teaching [the teaching of the prior art, not just the teaching of the closest prior art], thereby arriving at something falling within the terms of the claims, and thus achieving what the invention achieves?

If the skilled person would have been prompted to modify the closest prior art in such a way as to arrive at something falling within the terms of the claims, then the invention does not involve an inventive step.

The point is not whether the skilled person could have arrived at the invention by adapting or modifying the closest prior art, but whether they would have done so because the prior art would have incited him to do so in the hope of solving the objective technical problem or in expectation of some improvement or advantage. There has to be a reason for combining two documents. This must have been the case for the skilled person before the filing or priority date valid for the claim under examination.

== Specific cases ==
=== Partial problems ===
When applying the problem-solution approach, the objective technical problem is sometimes regarded as an aggregation of a plurality of "partial problems". "This is the case where there is no technical effect achieved by all the distinguishing features taken in combination, but rather a plurality of partial problems is independently solved by different sets of distinguishing features (...)." In that case, each set of distinguishing features is assessed independently.

For instance, two differences may be identified between the claimed subject-matter and a document considered to be the closest prior art, and these two differences may solve two different objective problems which are independent from each other. The two objective problems may then be treated "as separate partial problems for the purposes of assessing inventive step."

=== Inventions consisting in a mixture of technical and non-technical features ===
An invention may consist in a mixture of technical and non-technical features. In such cases, the EPO generally applies the so-called "Comvik approach" (cf. T 641/00) to assess whether the invention involves an inventive step. In accordance with the "Comvik approach", any non-technical feature, i.e. a feature from a field excluded from patentability under Article 52(2) and (3) EPC, is ignored for the assessment of inventive step, unless the non-technical features interact with the technical subject-matter to solve a technical problem. That is, "a positive assessment of inventive step can be based only on those elements and aspects of the invention in respect of which a technical effect can be established". Assessing whether or not a feature contributes to the technical character of a claim has been viewed as difficult.

The Comvik approach set out in decision T 641/00 is consistent with the principle that "technically non-functional modifications are (...) irrelevant to inventive step, even if the skilled person would never think of such a modification." A modification in a device which is such that the modification has no technical effect, i.e. no effect on the operation of the device, does not involve a solution to a technical problem. An arbitrary modification of a device does not involve an inventive step if the modification has no technical relevance.

=== Problem inventions ===
The discovery of an unrecognised problem may under certain circumstances lead to patentable subject-matter even though the claimed solution "is retrospectively trivial and in itself obvious". If the identification of a problem is not obvious, "the solution to the problem can not be obvious either, even if it retrospectively appears to be trivial in view of the identified problem."
