= G 1/03 and G 2/03 =

G 1/03 and G 2/03
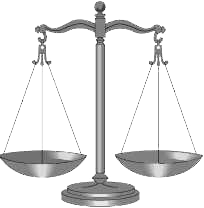

Enlarged Board of Appeal of the European Patent Office

Issued April 8, 2004
Board composition

Chairman: Peter Messerli
Members: R. Teschemacher, C. Andries, G. Davies, B. Jestaedt, A. Nuss, J.-C. Saisset

Headwords

Disclaimer/PPG (G 1/03), Disclaimer/GENETIC SYSTEMS (G2/03)

G 1/03 and G 2/03 are two decisions of the Enlarged Board of Appeal of the European Patent Office (EPO), which were both issued on April 8, 2004.

The decisions, which are identical, relate to the allowability of introducing disclaimers during the prosecution of a European patent application or during opposition proceedings relating to a granted European patent. More precisely, they relate to whether and under which circumstances an amendment introducing a negative limitation to a claim is allowable, when neither the negative limitation nor the subject-matter excluded by it from the scope of the claim have a basis in the application as filed (Article 123(2) EPC).

== Decision ==
The Board ruled that introducing a disclaimer which has no basis in the application as filed may be allowable in order to:

1. restore novelty by delimiting a claim against state of the art under Article 54(3) and (4) EPC, i.e. against a novelty-destroying conflicting application (a first European patent application is said to be a "conflicting application" when it was filed before the effective date of filing of a second European patent application, but when this first application was published only after the effective date of filing of the second application);
2. restore novelty by delimiting a claim against an accidental anticipation under Article 54(2) EPC, where an anticipation is said to be accidental if it is so unrelated to and remote from the claimed invention that the person skilled in the art would never have taken it into consideration when making the invention; and
3. disclaim subject-matter which, under Articles 52 to 57 EPC, is excluded from patentability for non-technical reasons. (Headnote of the decision, item II.1)

The Board however set out stringent criteria for their application (which have later led to many disclaimers being found inadmissible):

- "a disclaimer should not remove more than is necessary either to restore novelty or to disclaim subject-matter excluded from patentability for non-technical reasons"; (Headnote, item II.2)
- "a disclaimer which is or becomes relevant for the assessment of inventive step or sufficiency of disclosure adds subject-matter contrary to Article 123(2) EPC"; and (Headnote, item II.3)
- "a claim containing a disclaimer must meet the requirements of clarity and conciseness of Article 84 EPC". (Headnote, item II.4)

Decisions G 1/03 and G 2/03 only apply to "undisclosed disclaimers", i.e. disclaimers which are not disclosed in the application as filed. The framework of these decisions is limited to "(originally) undisclosed disclaimers".

== See also ==
- Amendments under the European Patent Convention

== Further resources ==
- Robert Young (8–9 November 2012). EPO boards of appeal and key decisions: Disclaimers and their legal basis, especially in the light of decisions G 1/03, 2/03 and G 2/10 – possible consequences for their use as an instrument of patent prosecution. Munich, Germany: European Patent Office.
- Legal Research Service for the Boards of Appeal, European Patent Office, Case Law of the Boards of Appeal of the EPO (10th edition, July 2022), i.a.1 : "Patent protection for technical inventions"
- Legal Research Service for the Boards of Appeal, European Patent Office, Case Law of the Boards of Appeal of the EPO (10th edition, July 2022), i.b.4.4.5.b : "Avoiding the exclusion of methods of treatment by surgery from patent protection under Article 53(c) EPC - disclaimer"
- Legal Research Service for the Boards of Appeal, European Patent Office, Case Law of the Boards of Appeal of the EPO (10th edition, July 2022), i.c.4.10 : "Determining the disclosure of the relevant prior art - accidental disclosure"
- Legal Research Service for the Boards of Appeal, European Patent Office, Case Law of the Boards of Appeal of the EPO (10th edition, July 2022), ii.c.1 : "Sufficiency of disclosure - introduction"
- Legal Research Service for the Boards of Appeal, European Patent Office, Case Law of the Boards of Appeal of the EPO (10th edition, July 2022), ii.c.3.2 : "Parts of the application relevant for assessing sufficiency of disclosure - alleged effect not a feature of the claims"
- Legal Research Service for the Boards of Appeal, European Patent Office, Case Law of the Boards of Appeal of the EPO (10th edition, July 2022), ii.c.5.2 : "Clarity and completeness of disclosure - indication of at least 'one way'"
- Legal Research Service for the Boards of Appeal, European Patent Office, Case Law of the Boards of Appeal of the EPO (10th edition, July 2022), ii.c.5.4 : "Clarity and completeness of disclosure - invention to be performed over whole range claimed"
- Legal Research Service for the Boards of Appeal, European Patent Office, Case Law of the Boards of Appeal of the EPO (10th edition, July 2022), ii.c.5.5.1.a : "Ambiguous parameters - essential parameters"
- Legal Research Service for the Boards of Appeal, European Patent Office, Case Law of the Boards of Appeal of the EPO (10th edition, July 2022), ii.c.6.1 : "Reproducibility - repeatability"
- Legal Research Service for the Boards of Appeal, European Patent Office, Case Law of the Boards of Appeal of the EPO (10th edition, July 2022), ii.c.6.8 : "Reproducibility - post-published documents"
- Legal Research Service for the Boards of Appeal, European Patent Office, Case Law of the Boards of Appeal of the EPO (10th edition, July 2022), ii.c.7.2.1 : "Level of disclosure required for medical use – plausibility - principles established by the case law"
- Legal Research Service for the Boards of Appeal, European Patent Office, Case Law of the Boards of Appeal of the EPO (10th edition, July 2022), ii.c.7.3 : "Level of disclosure required for antibodies"
- Legal Research Service for the Boards of Appeal, European Patent Office, Case Law of the Boards of Appeal of the EPO (10th edition, July 2022), ii.d.3.1.2 : "G 2/98 and the concept of disclosure – interpretation in the same way as for Article 123(2) EPC"
- Legal Research Service for the Boards of Appeal, European Patent Office, Case Law of the Boards of Appeal of the EPO (10th edition, July 2022), ii.d.3.1.6 : "Enabling disclosure in the priority document"
- Legal Research Service for the Boards of Appeal, European Patent Office, Case Law of the Boards of Appeal of the EPO (10th edition, July 2022), ii.d.4.1 : "First application in respect of the invention - identity of invention"
- Legal Research Service for the Boards of Appeal, European Patent Office, Case Law of the Boards of Appeal of the EPO (10th edition, July 2022), ii.d.5.3.3 : "Multiple priorities or partial priority for one claim - application of G 1/15 in the jurisprudence of the boards"
- Legal Research Service for the Boards of Appeal, European Patent Office, Case Law of the Boards of Appeal of the EPO (10th edition, July 2022), ii.e.1.1 : "Article 123(2) EPC – added subject-matter - general principles"
- Legal Research Service for the Boards of Appeal, European Patent Office, Case Law of the Boards of Appeal of the EPO (10th edition, July 2022), ii.e.1.6.2.a : "Selections from two lists – singling out a combination of features - principles"
- Legal Research Service for the Boards of Appeal, European Patent Office, Case Law of the Boards of Appeal of the EPO (10th edition, July 2022), ii.e.1.7.1 : "Disclaimers - definition"
- Legal Research Service for the Boards of Appeal, European Patent Office, Case Law of the Boards of Appeal of the EPO (10th edition, July 2022), ii.e.1.7.2 : "Disclaimers - standards for examining disclosed and undisclosed disclaimers"
- Legal Research Service for the Boards of Appeal, European Patent Office, Case Law of the Boards of Appeal of the EPO (10th edition, July 2022), ii.e.1.7.2.a : "Disclaimers - standards for examining disclosed and undisclosed disclaimers - principles established in G 1/03 and G 2/03 for undisclosed disclaimers"
- Legal Research Service for the Boards of Appeal, European Patent Office, Case Law of the Boards of Appeal of the EPO (10th edition, July 2022), ii.e.1.7.2.b : "Disclaimers - standards for examining disclosed and undisclosed disclaimers - principles established in G 2/10 for disclosed disclaimers"
- Legal Research Service for the Boards of Appeal, European Patent Office, Case Law of the Boards of Appeal of the EPO (10th edition, July 2022), ii.e.1.7.2.c : "Disclaimers - standards for examining disclosed and undisclosed disclaimers - explanations in G 1/16"
- Legal Research Service for the Boards of Appeal, European Patent Office, Case Law of the Boards of Appeal of the EPO (10th edition, July 2022), ii.e.1.7.3.a : "Disclaimers - decisions applying the criteria established by the Enlarged Board in G 1/03 and G 1/16 - accidental anticipation"
- Legal Research Service for the Boards of Appeal, European Patent Office, Case Law of the Boards of Appeal of the EPO (10th edition, July 2022), ii.e.1.7.3.b : "Disclaimers - decisions applying the criteria established by the Enlarged Board in G 1/03 and G 1/16 - accidental anticipation - disclosure of the interfering document not novelty destroying"
- Legal Research Service for the Boards of Appeal, European Patent Office, Case Law of the Boards of Appeal of the EPO (10th edition, July 2022), ii.e.1.7.3.b : "Disclaimers - decisions applying the criteria established by the Enlarged Board in G 1/03 and G 1/16 - accidental anticipation - disclaimer covered more than what was disclosed in the prior art"
- Legal Research Service for the Boards of Appeal, European Patent Office, Case Law of the Boards of Appeal of the EPO (10th edition, July 2022), ii.e.1.7.3.d : "Disclaimers - decisions applying the criteria established by the Enlarged Board in G 1/03 and G 1/16 - drafting of disclaimers – delimitation against any potential prior art"
- Legal Research Service for the Boards of Appeal, European Patent Office, Case Law of the Boards of Appeal of the EPO (10th edition, July 2022), ii.e.1.7.3.e : "Disclaimers - decisions applying the criteria established by the Enlarged Board in G 1/03 and G 1/16 - drafting of disclaimers – clarity"
- Legal Research Service for the Boards of Appeal, European Patent Office, Case Law of the Boards of Appeal of the EPO (10th edition, July 2022), ii.e.1.7.3.f : "Disclaimers - decisions applying the criteria established by the Enlarged Board in G 1/03 and G 1/16 - drafting of disclaimers – undisclosed disclaimer must not relate to the teaching of the invention"
- Legal Research Service for the Boards of Appeal, European Patent Office, Case Law of the Boards of Appeal of the EPO (10th edition, July 2022), ii.e.1.7.3.g : "Disclaimers - decisions applying the criteria established by the Enlarged Board in G 1/03 and G 1/16 - drafting of disclaimers – positive features – G 1/03 not applicable"
- Legal Research Service for the Boards of Appeal, European Patent Office, Case Law of the Boards of Appeal of the EPO (10th edition, July 2022), ii.e.1.7.3.h : "Disclaimers - decisions applying the criteria established by the Enlarged Board in G 1/03 and G 1/16 - drafting of disclaimers – negative feature implicitly disclosed in original application – G 1/03 not applicable"
- Legal Research Service for the Boards of Appeal, European Patent Office, Case Law of the Boards of Appeal of the EPO (10th edition, July 2022), ii.e.1.7.5 : "Disclaimers - applicability of the decisions of the enlarged board to cases already pending"
- Legal Research Service for the Boards of Appeal, European Patent Office, Case Law of the Boards of Appeal of the EPO (10th edition, July 2022), ii.e.1.7.6 : "Disclaimers - no analogy with G 1/03 where a disclaimer already in the application as filed is deleted"
- Legal Research Service for the Boards of Appeal, European Patent Office, Case Law of the Boards of Appeal of the EPO (10th edition, July 2022), ii.e.1.15 : "Article 123(2) EPC – added subject-matter - "comprises", "consists of", "consists essentially of", "contains""
- Legal Research Service for the Boards of Appeal, European Patent Office, Case Law of the Boards of Appeal of the EPO (10th edition, July 2022), ii.e.3.2.1 : "Relationship between Article 123(2) EPC and Article 123(3) EPC - attempts to resolve the conflict - general"
- Legal Research Service for the Boards of Appeal, European Patent Office, Case Law of the Boards of Appeal of the EPO (10th edition, July 2022), iii.a.6.1 : "Legitimate expectation and case law - case law deviating from or overruling the practice"
- Legal Research Service for the Boards of Appeal, European Patent Office, Case Law of the Boards of Appeal of the EPO (10th edition, July 2022), iii.h.1.2.3 : "Application of the rules of interpretation - teleological interpretation"
- Legal Research Service for the Boards of Appeal, European Patent Office, Case Law of the Boards of Appeal of the EPO (10th edition, July 2022), iii.n.2.4 : "Formal requirements - anonymously filed observations"
- Legal Research Service for the Boards of Appeal, European Patent Office, Case Law of the Boards of Appeal of the EPO (10th edition, July 2022), v.a.3.1.7.f : "Exceptions to the prohibition of reformatio in peius - undisclosed disclaimer"
