= Grant procedure before the European Patent Office =

Graph of European patent applications filed and granted between 1998 and 2007. The average time from filing to grant in 2007 was 43.7 months (3.6 years).

The grant procedure before the European Patent Office (EPO) is an ex parte, administrative procedure, which includes the filing of a European patent application, the examination of formalities, the establishment of a search report, the publication of the application, its substantive examination, and the grant of a patent, or the refusal of the application, in accordance with the legal provisions of the European Patent Convention (EPC). The grant procedure is carried out by the EPO under the supervision of the Administrative Council of the European Patent Organisation. The patents granted in accordance with the EPC are called European patents.

In other words, the grant procedure before the EPO is the procedure leading to the grant of a European patent or to the refusal to grant a European patent. The procedure starts with the filing of an application and ends with the grant of a European patent or the refusal of the patent application by the EPO, or the withdrawal of the application by the applicant, or its deemed withdrawal. (Note: The application may for instance be deemed withdrawn under Article 94(4) EPC, if the applicant fails to respond to a communication of the Examining Division in due time.) The prosecution of European patent applications until grant typically takes several years.

== Main procedural steps ==
=== Filing ===
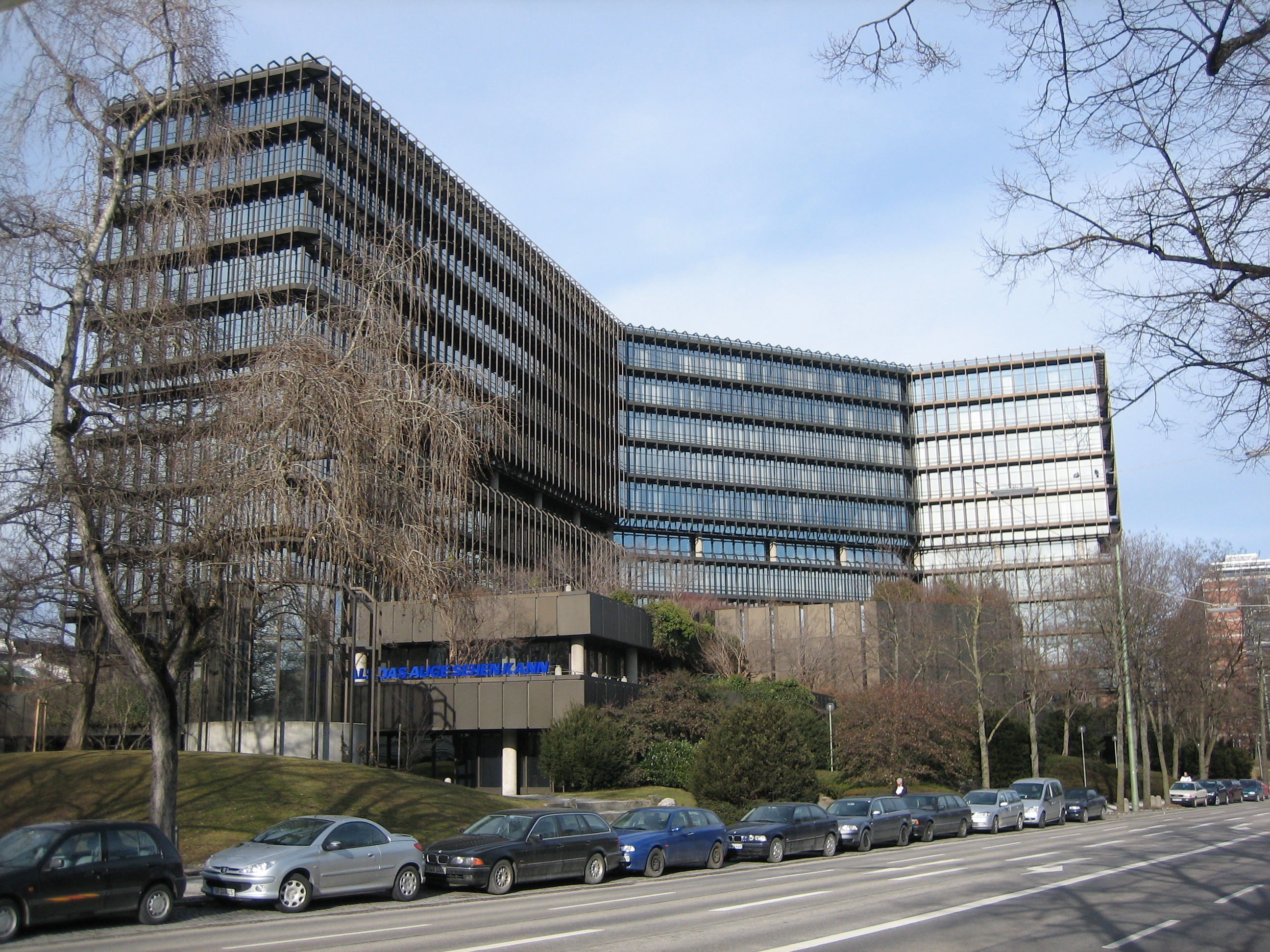
EPO headquarters in Munich

European patent applications can be filed at the EPO at Munich, Germany, at The Hague, Netherlands, at Berlin, Germany, or "if the law of a Contracting State so permits, at the central industrial property office or other competent authority of that State". This latter provision is important in some countries. For example, in the United Kingdom, it used to be required to obtain clearance for all inventions but now it is only prohibited for a UK resident to file an overseas patent application for inventions in certain sensitive technical areas without obtaining clearance through the United Kingdom Intellectual Property Office first. European patent applications cannot be validly filed at the EPO in Vienna, Austria.

Within one month after the filing of an application, a filing fee and a search fee are due. Additional fees may also be due depending on the size of the application and the number of claims. Namely, if the application comprises more than 35 pages, an additional fee is due (of 16 Euros, as of August 2021) for the 36th and each subsequent page. Furthermore, if the application contains more than fifteen claims at the time of filing, claim fees are due. As of August 2021, a claims fee of 245 Euros is due for the 16th and each subsequent claim up to the limit of 50, and a claims fee of 610 Euros for the 51st and each subsequent claim.

European patent applications may be filed in any language, in accordance with Article 5 of the Patent Law Treaty (PLT). However, if an application is filed in a language other than one of the three official languages, namely English, French and German, a translation must be filed into one of the official languages within two months from the date of filing. The official language of filing (or of the translation) becomes the "language of proceedings" and is used by the EPO for communications.

=== Formalities examination ===
The examination of whether the requirements for the accordance of a filing date and other formal requirements are satisfied is carried out by the EPO in accordance with Article 90 EPC. If a date of filing cannot be accorded, the application is not dealt with as a European patent application. If the European patent application has been accorded a date of filing, but if there are other formal deficiencies, the applicant is offered an opportunity to correct these deficiencies. If the deficiencies are not corrected, the European patent application is refused, unless a different legal consequence applies.

Oral proceedings may exceptionally take place before the Receiving Section, to give an opportunity to the applicant to be heard on an issue involving formality requirements.

=== Publication and provisional rights ===
A European patent application is published as soon as possible "after the expiry of a period of eighteen months from the date of filing or, if priority has been claimed, from the date of priority", or "at the request of the applicant, before the expiry of that period". While early publication of a European patent application can be requested, there are no provisions in the EPC which would permit any delaying of the publication. There is indeed an overriding public interest in the timely publication of the application.

As from its publication, a European patent application may confer to the applicant some provisional rights in the contracting states designated in the application. These rights include at least the right for the applicant to "claim compensation reasonable in the circumstances from any person who has used the invention in that State in circumstances where that person would be liable under national law for infringement of a national patent." In relation to some contracting states however, a translation of the claims is required for the provisional rights to come into effect.

=== Search ===
The Search Divisions of the EPO establish search reports, named "European search reports", on the basis of the claims, "with due regard to the description and any drawings". The European search report established for a patent application is transmitted to the applicant together with copies of any cited documents.

"The search is an essential element of the grant procedure, being designed to identify prior art relevant to the application. The intention is to make it possible to determine, on the basis of the documents mentioned in the search report, whether and to what extent the invention is patentable (...). Knowledge of the prior art forms the basis for examination of the application by the examining divisions. It is also important for applicants, giving them a basis for deciding whether to continue prosecuting their applications and have them examined. Lastly, it is also important for the public and especially for competitors, enabling them to gain an idea of the scope of any protection that might be granted."

In exceptional cases, a declaration that no search report can be performed is issued, for example because carrying a meaningful search is not considered possible by the Search Division.

Before the search, communications between the search division and the applicant were not foreseen prior to April 1, 2010. However, under new Rules 62a and 63 EPC, if there are more than one independent claim per claim category (and if the provisions of Rule 43(2) EPC are considered not to be met) or if the search division considers that it is impossible to carry out a meaningful search based on the subject-matter claimed, communications between the search division and the applicant are possible. Under Rule 137(1) EPC however, no amendments to the application can be made before the search "unless otherwise provided".

Along with the search report, a search opinion is also established. The search opinion and the search report form together the so-called extended European search report. Before April 1, 2010, a response to the search opinion was optional. Currently however, under new Rule 70a EPC, a reply to the search opinion is mandatory, within six months "after the date on which the European Patent Bulletin mentions the publication of the European search report" (which is also the time limit for requesting examination). If no reply is filed to the search opinion, the application is deemed to be withdrawn. The search opinion is therefore a conventional office action with a given time period to respond.

=== Designation of States and examination request ===
All the Contracting States party to the EPC at the time of filing of a European patent application are deemed to be designated in the request for grant of a European patent, i.e. upon filing of the application. A flat designation fee must then be paid within six months of the date on which the European Patent Bulletin mentions the publication of the European search report.

Under Article 94(1) EPC and Rule 70(1) EPC, an examination request must also be made within six months from the date on which the European Patent Bulletin mentions the publication of the European search report. The examination fee is also due at that time. The examination request may not be withdrawn (although the application may be withdrawn at any time). If no examination request is made, the application is deemed to be withdrawn.

=== Substantive examination ===
The substantive examination of European patent applications includes the examination of patentability of the claimed invention, i.e. whether the invention is not excluded as unpatentable subject-matter by policy, whether the invention is new, involves an inventive step, and is susceptible of industrial application. In addition, the invention must be sufficiently disclosed in the application, and the claims must be clear and concise.

Unless the application is directly ready for grant, communications under Article 94(3) EPC are issued by the Examining Division and notified to the applicant or the appointed representative. In such communications, the Examining Division invites the applicant to reply within a given period, by correcting the "deficiencies noted and [amending] the description, claims and drawings", where appropriate. If amendments are filed, the amendments must not extend the content of the application as filed, or, in other words, there must not be any added subject-matter. In that context, the applicant is master of its own application in that the decision to amend or not, and how to amend the application, is a decision of the applicant alone (although the Examining Division may apply pressure to have amendments made).

During examination, oral proceedings may take place at the EPO's own behest or at the request of the applicant. (Note: It is common for an applicant to have a standing (precautionary) request for oral proceedings on file "to avoid a nasty surprise in the form of a [written decision of] refusal of the application", without having had the opportunity to present any arguments orally in front of the whole, usually three-member Examining Division.) They are held before the Examining Division itself, in Munich or the Hague, and are not public, in contrast to oral proceedings in opposition, which are public unless very particular circumstances apply. The right to oral proceedings is a specific and codified part of the procedural right to be heard. A decision is typically rendered at the end of the oral proceedings.

A decision by an Examining Division to refuse a European patent application, like any other final decisions of first instance divisions, is appealable.

=== Communication under Rule 71(3) EPC and grant, or refusal ===
If the Examining Division reaches the conviction that the European patent application satisfies all the requirements of the EPC so that a European patent may be granted, it issues a communication under Rule 71(3) EPC. By issuing such a communication, the Examining Division informs the applicant of the intention to grant a patent based on the prosecuted application. The claims must then be translated in the other two official languages of the EPO, and fees for grant and publishing must be paid. If the applicant pays the fees for grant and publishing and files the translation of the claims in due time, he is deemed to have been approved the text intended for grant. If not, the European patent application is deemed to be withdrawn. The time limit for paying the fees for grant and publishing, and for filing the translation of the claims is four months. This time limit is non-extendable.

The decision of the Examining Division to grant a European patent takes effect on the date on which the mention of the grant is published in the European Patent Bulletin. The Examining Division is then bound by its final decision on an application, which can be set aside only following an admissible, allowable appeal. The decision to grant ends the examination procedure. The European patent is then published in the language of the proceedings (i.e., the language used during the examination proceedings) together with a translation of the claims in the other two EPO official languages. The text of the published patent can always be brought into line with the text approved by the applicant if an error occurred when preparing the publication.

In contrast, if the Examining Division considers that the application does not meet the provisions of the EPC, the application is refused. As mentioned above, as any other first instance decision terminating the proceedings, (Note: A first instance decision to grant a patent can even be appealed if the granted text is not the text approved by the proprietor. In such case "the proprietor is adversely affected [within the meaning of Article 107 EPC] by that decision and is entitled to appeal (G 1/10, point 12 of the reasons)".) a decision to refuse an application is appealable. If an appeal is lodged against the decision of refusal and if the Examining Division regards the appeal to be admissible and well founded, the Examining Division has to rectify its decision. This is called an "interlocutory revision". Otherwise, the appeal is remitted to the Board of Appeal "without delay, and without comment as to its merit".

=== After grant ===
Once granted, a European patent effectively comes into existence as a group of national patents in each of the designated Contracting States, and the European patent is enforceable on a country-by-country basis. The European patent may be centrally opposed at the EPO before the expiry of a nine-month period following the publication of grant. Once the nine-month opposition period has ended, third parties wishing to challenge the validity of a European patent have to institute revocation proceedings in each country in which they wish to invalidate the European patent. Filing a revocation action at the Unified Patent Court (UPC) is also possible if the European patent has not been opted out.

Once a European patent is granted or more precisely within three months from the date of grant, the European patent must also be translated in an official language of each country in which the patentee wants patent protection –unless a translation is not required by application of the London Agreement. If the translation of the European patent is not provided to the national patent office within the prescribed time limit, the patent is deemed to be void ab initio in the corresponding country.

The patent proprietor may also file a request for unitary effect at the EPO to obtain a European patent with unitary effect in the countries participating the Unified Patent Court Agreement (UPCA). The request for unitary effect "must be filed within one month of the date of publication of the mention of the grant in the European Patent Bulletin".

== Additional considerations and special cases ==
=== Renewal fees ===
Renewal fees are payable to the European Patent Office in respect of pending European patent applications in respect of the third year from the date of filing. These fees are paid in advance of the year in which they are due (such that the renewal fee for the third year falls due two years from the date of filing) and fall due on the last day of the month containing the anniversary of the date of filing.

=== Observations by third parties ===
After the publication of a European patent application, anyone can file observations regarding the patentability of the invention which is the subject of the application or, after grant, subject of the patent. This is a form of public participation in the examination of patent applications. A person filing observations during examination proceedings does not however become party to the proceedings. This notably means that such person has no right to attend oral proceedings before the Examining Division, which are not public. This contrasts with the filing of a post-grant opposition, wherein the opponent becomes party to the proceedings, therefore acquiring, notably, the right to be heard before any decision is taken. Observations by third parties, which must be filed in writing, may be filed by post or online.

=== Divisional applications ===
A divisional application of a European patent application can be filed as long as the latter is still pending. European divisional applications must be filed directly or by post with one of the filing offices of the EPO, i.e. at the European Patent Office at Munich, The Hague, or Berlin. It may also be filed using the so-called epoline online filing software. The filing of a European divisional application with a national authority has no effect in law.

=== Stay of the proceedings when entitlement proceedings are initiated ===
The grant proceedings may be stayed if national proceedings have been instituted before a national court or authority by a third party seeking a judgment recognizing its entitlement to the grant of the European patent in lieu of the applicant on record. However, grant proceedings are not stayed before the publication of the application. If a final decision is issued recognizing the entitlement of the third party to the grant of the European patent, the third party may

"(a) prosecute the European patent application as his own application in place of the applicant;
(b) file a new European patent application in respect of the same invention; or
(c) request that the European patent application be refused."

Under Rule 14(3) EPC, the European Patent Office may resume the grant proceedings at any time "regardless of the stage reached in the national proceedings", taking all valid interests into account.

=== Interruption of the proceedings ===
The proceedings may also be interrupted under Rule 142 EPC in the event that "an applicant for (or proprietor of) a European patent (...) is temporarily unable to act in proceedings before the European Patent Office", such as in the event of "the death or legal incapacity of the applicant for or proprietor of a European patent" or, if "the applicant for or proprietor of a patent, as a result of some action taken against his property, [is] prevented by legal reasons from continuing the proceedings". The interruption is declared ex officio by the EPO, is retroactive (even if the EPO declares the interruption several years after the occurrence of the loss of rights), and it allows the affected party to later remedy, when the proceedings are resumed, "any loss of rights which occurred during this period".

=== Euro-PCT applications ===
The grant procedure before the EPO can also be initiated by filing an international (PCT) application and then entering the so-called EP national phase (also called "European phase"). An international application that has entered the EP national phase is often called a "Euro-PCT application". For the entry into EP phase, a translation of the international application in one of the EPO official languages (English, French or German) must be filed if the international application was not already in one of these languages.

The EPO performs, for each Euro-PCT application, a supplementary European search unless the EPO prepared the international search report (or a supplementary international search report). If a supplementary European search is performed, the applicant must reply to the search opinion contained in the supplementary European search report. If no supplementary European search is performed, the applicant must reply to the written opinion accompanying the international search report or, if an international preliminary examination was performed, to the International Preliminary Examination Report (Chapter II).

=== PACE programme ===
The programme for accelerated prosecution of European patent applications, or PACE programme, "enables applicants who want their applications processed rapidly to obtain the European search report plus opinion under Rule 62(1) EPC, the first examination report and any communication under Rule 71(3) EPC within tight deadlines". As of January 1, 2016, a written, online request ("PACE request") must be filed, using a "dedicated request form (EPO Form 1005)", to request acceleration under the PACE programme. The PACE requests are excluded from public inspection. As of 2009, accelerated processing under PACE was reported to be requested in only 6.3% of files. An enquiry by the applicant to know when the next communication is to be expected is not regarded as a request for accelerated prosecution.

=== BEST programme ===
Under the so-called "Bringing Examination and Search Together" programme or BEST programme (also referred to as "BEST system"), the EPO's examination procedure was reorganized in 1990, with the primary examiner of the Examining Division being the examiner who had carried out the search.

=== Withdrawal of an application ===
Withdrawal of an application is the gravest procedural step that can be taken, since the application becomes dead without possibility of revival. A European patent application may be withdrawn at any time by the applicant, except when a third party has initiated proceedings concerning entitlement to the grant of the European patent. One reason for withdrawing an application may be to avoid its publication, if for instance it has been decided to keep the invention secret instead of applying for a patent. To avoid publication, the withdrawal must occur before "the termination of the technical preparations for publication". Another reason for withdrawing an application may be to obtain a refund of the search fee and/or examination fee, if it has been decided not to pursue the application further. According to the EPO Guidelines,

"The application may be withdrawn by means of a signed declaration, which should be unqualified and unambiguous (...). The applicant is bound by an effective declaration of withdrawal (...), but may make it subject to the proviso that the content of the application is not made known to the public."

The Boards of Appeal have dealt in a great number of decisions with the question of whether the withdrawal of a European patent application can be retracted, because it was made erroneously. In particular, the Boards have held that the "withdrawal of a European patent application can only be retracted as long as the public has not been officially informed about the withdrawal". In other words, in the interests of legal certainty, it is generally too late to request retraction of a notice of withdrawal after the withdrawal has been registered and notified to the public in the European Patent Bulletin, since in that case the retraction of withdrawal would adversely affect the public interest or the interests of third parties.

== Responsibilities within the EPO ==
An Examining Division is normally made up of three technically qualified examiners: a primary examiner, (Note: The primary examiner (a term used 21 times in the EPO Guidelines, March 2021 edition) is sometimes called "first examiner".) who draws up the search report and conducts most of the correspondence (written or on the telephone) with the applicant; a Chairman who has overall control of the examination of the application and who chairs any oral proceedings that are held; and a second examiner who is responsible for taking the minutes of any oral proceedings. All three members have a vote on any issues that have to be decided, including the main decision of whether to allow or refuse the patent application. If the Examining Division is augmented with a legally qualified member, so that the Division consists of four members, then the Chairman has a casting vote.

== Statistics ==
The EPO received its first application in 1978. The one millionth application was published on May 17, 2000, and two millionth one on December 10, 2008. Over 70% of the patent applications filed in 1991 have been finally granted.
