= Divisional applications under the European Patent Convention =

During the grant procedure before the European Patent Office (EPO), divisional applications can be filed under Article 76 EPC out of pending earlier European patent applications. A divisional application, sometimes called European divisional application, is a new patent application which is separate and independent from the earlier application, unless specific provisions in the European Patent Convention (EPC) require something different. A divisional application, which is divided from an earlier application, cannot be broader than the earlier application, neither in terms of subject-matter nor in terms of geographical cover.

== Background ==
The possibility to file a divisional application is provided in many patent systems and is guaranteed by Article 4.G. of the Paris Convention for the Protection of Industrial Property of 1883, to which, as of June 2026, more than 181 countries are Contracting Parties.

Some basic characteristics of a divisional application are as follows:

"A divisional application is an application which derives from an earlier application. It is filed after the earlier application (usually some years later), but keeps the same filing and priority dates as the earlier application. That way the divisional is not affected in terms of its patentability by any publications which occur between the filing of the earlier application and the filing of the divisional. The earlier application is often referred to as the "parent"."

== Relation to the parent European patent application ==
=== Procedure independent from that of the parent application ===
A divisional application under the EPC is a new patent application which is separate and independent from the parent application, unless specific provisions in the European Patent Convention (EPC) require something different.

"The procedure concerning the divisional application is in principle independent from the procedure concerning the parent application and the divisional application is treated as a new application.... Although there are some connections between the two procedures (e.g. concerning time limits), actions (or omissions) occurring in the procedure concerning the parent application after the filing of the divisional application should not influence the procedure concerning the latter...."

=== No extension of subject-matter ===
A divisional application may, however, be filed "only in respect of subject-matter which does not extend beyond the content of the earlier application as filed." The practice relating to the filing of divisional applications under the EPC was clarified by the Enlarged Board of Appeal of the EPO in June 2007. The Board held that a divisional application which on filing contained subject-matter extending beyond the content of the earlier application as filed could be amended later to remove the deficiency, even at a time when the earlier application is no longer pending.

=== No extension of geographical scope ===
In terms of geographical scope, a Contracting State can only be designated in a divisional application if that State was designated in the parent application at the time of filing of the divisional.

== Time limit for filing a divisional application ==
The conditions for filing divisional applications regarding the time limit to be met have however been modified several times since the entry into force of the European Patent Convention in the 1970s, and changed again on 1 April 2010. What has not been changed however is that a divisional application can by no means be filed after grant of a European patent, i.e. based on a European patent. A divisional application can only be filed based on a pending European patent application, provided that the provisions of Rule 36(1) EPC are met.

=== Situation prior to 1 April 2010 ===
Prior to 1 April 2010, it was only required that the parent application be pending at the time the divisional application is filed. A divisional application of a European patent application could be filed for any pending application up to the day preceding the mention of grant of the European patent, but not including the date of grant.

=== Rules applicable between 1 April 2010 and 31 March 2014 ===
As of 1 April 2010,

"divisional applications on the applicant's own initiative (so-called voluntary divisional applications) will need to be filed within a period of two years from the first communication by the EPO examining division in respect of the parent (i.e. the previous) or an even earlier (in case of a "chain" of applications) application."

Rule 36(1) EPC has been amended to read as follows:

"(1) The applicant may file a divisional application relating to any pending earlier European patent application, provided that:

(a) the divisional application is filed before the expiry of a time limit of twenty-four months from the Examining Division's first communication in respect of the earliest application for which a communication has been issued, or

(b) the divisional application is filed before the expiry of a time limit of twenty-four months from any communication in which the Examining Division has objected that the earlier application does not meet the requirements of Article 82, provided it was raising that specific objection for the first time."

New Rule 36(1)(a) introduced a time limit for voluntary division of the parent application, while Rule 36(1)(b) provides a time limit for mandatory division of the parent application in case of a lack of unity under Article 82 EPC. "Mandatory" in that sense means that, to cover each of the non-unitary inventions (i.e. the inventions that are non-unitary in relation to the invention which will be the subject of the parent application), one or more divisional applications need to be filed. However, if the applicant decides not to seek patent protection for the non-unitary inventions, no divisional applications need to be filed.

In a decision dated 26 October 2010, the Administrative Council further specified, or clarified, that "the Examining Division's first communication" referred to in Rule 36(1)(a) EPC had to be a communication under Article 94(3) EPC, and Rule 71(1) and (2) EPC, or Rule 71(3) EPC.

=== New rules since 1 April 2014 ===
In October 2013, the Administrative Council of the European Patent Organisation again amended Rules 36, 38 and 135 of the Implementing Regulations, which define the time limits for filing divisional applications in Europe. The new rules apply to divisional applications filed on or after 1 April 2014. According to the new rules, the filing of divisional patent applications is again possible as long as the earlier patent application is pending.

An additional fee is however due "in the case of a divisional application filed in respect of any earlier application which is itself a divisional application". In other words, an additional fee for the filing of divisional applications of the second or any further generation was introduced. The amount of the additional fees was announced in December 2013. The purpose of the additional fee is "to discourage the filing of long sequences of divisional applications", so as to also discourage "the prolongation of pendency periods". The "use of divisional applications as a tool for prolonging the pendency of subject-matter before the EPO" has been regarded by the EPO as "detrimental to legal certainty for third parties as well as to patent office workloads".

=== Meaning of "pending earlier European application" ===
As mentioned above, a divisional application can only be filed based on a pending European patent application. Several Board of Appeal decisions have dealt with the meaning of a "pending earlier European application" (Rule 36(1) EPC: "The applicant may file a divisional application relating to any pending earlier European patent application, provided that ..."). This is indeed not defined in the EPC.

In Board of Appeal decision J 18/09, it was held that a divisional application cannot be validly filed based on a PCT application before entry into European regional phase, as later confirmed in Enlarged Board of Appeal decision G 1/09. In other words, "a Euro-PCT-application not having entered the European phase is not a pending earlier European application in the sense of Rule 36(1) PCT". This contrasts with the situation in the United States, as laid out in the U.S. Manual of Patent Examining Procedure (MPEP).

In decision G 1/09, the Enlarged Board of Appeal held that

"In the case where no appeal is filed, a European patent application which has been refused by a decision of the Examining Division is thereafter still pending within the meaning of Rule 25 EPC 1973 (Rule 36(1) EPC) until the expiry of the time limit for filing a notice of appeal."

In decision J 4/11, the Legal Board of Appeal held that

"An application which has been deemed to be withdrawn for non-payment of a renewal fee is not pending within the meaning of Rule 25(1) EPC 1973 in the period for filing a request for re-establishment of rights under Article 122 EPC 1973 in respect of such non-payment or in the period after which such an application is filed in the event of such request being refused."

== Further requirements regarding the filing of a divisional application ==
European divisional applications must be filed directly or by post with one of the filing offices of the EPO, i.e. at the European Patent Office at Munich, The Hague, or Berlin. It may also be filed using the so-called epoline online filing software.

The filing of a European divisional application with a national authority (such as a national patent office) has no effect in law. The national authority may however, as a service, choose to forward the divisional application to the EPO. If the authority does so, the divisional application is deemed to be received at the time the documents are received at the EPO. The authority has, however, no obligation to do so.

== See also ==
- G 1/09 (decision by the Enlarged Board of Appeal on the issue of pending applications)
- G 1/15 (decision by the Enlarged Board of Appeal on the issue of partial priority)
