= Patent Application Information Retrieval =

American patent information service

Patent Application Information Retrieval (PAIR) is an online service provided by the United States Patent and Trademark Office to allow users to see the prosecution histories of United States patents and patent applications and obtain copies of documents filed therein. There are two services: Public PAIR, which allows the general public to access information regarding patents and published applications; and Private PAIR, which allows authorized persons to access information regarding applications regardless of publication status.

== Displayed tabs ==
When a patent application is accessed through PAIR, the following tabs are displayed:

- Select New Case, to go to a different patent or application
- Application Data (default), showing bibliographic data about the application
- Transaction History, showing a list of transactions in the prosecution history
- Image File Wrapper, from which PDF copies of documents in the prosecution history may be downloaded
- Continuity Data
- Foreign Priority
- Published documents, identifying the patent application publication and patent, if any
- Address & Attorney/Agent, showing contact information
- Assignments
- Display References

== Public PAIR ==
Anyone may use Public PAIR to access the prosecution histories of patents and of those applications that have been published. Unpublished applications are unavailable through Public PAIR. To access Public PAIR, one must verify through a reCAPTCHA process that one is not a robot. Non-patent literature cited in a patent application is not available for viewing or downloading through Public PAIR because of concerns over copyright infringement.

== Private PAIR ==
Users may use Private PAIR to access the prosecution histories of patents, published applications, and those unpublished applications that they are authorized to see. Private PAIR is accessible to registered patent attorneys and agents (and those working under their supervision) who have customer numbers. In 2019, the authentication changed from the use of PKI certificates to the use of two-factor authentication. For an unpublished application, the customer number must match that associated with the requested data.

== Retirement ==
Public Pair was retired after July 31, 2022, in favor of the USPTO Patent Center. Private PAIR will be retired after November 8, 2023, also in favor of Patent Center.

== See also ==
- Electronic Filing System (USPTO)
- European Patent Register, service similar to PAIR, but provided by the European Patent Office (EPO) for European patent applications and patents
