= Opposition procedure before the European Patent Office =

Procedure for challenging a European patent

The opposition procedure before the European Patent Office (EPO) is a post-grant, contentious, inter partes, administrative procedure intended to allow any European patent to be centrally opposed. European patents granted by the EPO under the European Patent Convention (EPC) may be opposed by any person from the public (no commercial or other interest whatsoever need be shown). This happens often when some prior art was not found during the grant procedure, but was only known by third parties.

An opposition can only be based on a limited number of grounds, i.e. on the grounds that the subject-matter of the patent is not patentable, that the invention is insufficiently disclosed, or that the content of the patent extends beyond the content of the application as filed. The notice of opposition to a European patent must be filed in writing at the EPO (either at Munich, The Hague or Berlin), along with the payment of an opposition fee, within nine months from the publication of the mention of the grant of the patent in the European Patent Bulletin. Opposition Divisions of the EPO are responsible for the examination of oppositions. The opposition procedure may involve multiple opponents. According to the EPO, a European patent was once opposed by a record number of 27 opponents.

== Purpose of the opposition proceedings, extent of the opposition, and available grounds for opposition ==
The purpose of the EPO opposition proceedings is to give members of the public, such as competitors of the patent proprietor, the opportunity to challenge centrally before the EPO the validity of a granted European patent. (Note: The EPC does not provide any pre-grant opposition proceedings. However, during examination proceedings (and also during pending opposition proceedings), any third party may, pursuant to Article 115 EPC, file observations on the patentability of an invention which is the subject of a European patent application, in particular to draw the attention of the EPO to some relevant prior art documents. A person submitting third-party observations does not become party to the proceedings. See Observations by third parties under the EPC.) No commercial or any other interest whatsoever need be shown. That is, the "opponent's motives are of no relevance for the purposes of the opposition procedure".

Opponents may challenge only some of the claims of the European patent (although this is in practice rather unusual), therefore limiting the extent of the opposition to the challenged claims.

However, an opposition can only be based on a limited number of grounds (i.e., objections) specified in the European Patent Convention, namely the grounds listed in Article 100 EPC. An opposition can be based on the grounds that the subject-matter of the patent is not patentable (Article 100(a) EPC, for instance because the claimed invention is not new or not inventive), on the ground that the invention is insufficiently disclosed to allow a person skilled in the art to carry it out (Article 100(b) EPC), or on the ground that the content of the patent extends beyond the content of the application as filed –"or, if the patent was granted on a divisional application or on a new application filed under Article 61 EPC, beyond the content of the earlier application as filed"– (Article 100(c) EPC). For example, an opposition cannot be validly based on the grounds that the invention lacks unity (Article 82 EPC), that the claims are not clear (Article 84 EPC), or that the right to the European patent does not belong to the proprietor of the patent (Article 60(1) EPC).

== Filing and admissibility ==
Before starting the substantive examination of the opposition, the Opposition Division examines whether the opposition must be considered as filed ("Is there an opposition?") and whether it is admissible ("Is the opposition admissible?"). The Opposition Division may find that the opposition is not deemed to have been filed, for instance because the opposition fee has not been paid within the nine-month opposition period, because the notice of opposition is not signed, or because the notice is not in an accepted language.

In order for an opposition to be admissible it must meet the provisions of

- Article 99(1) EPC, i.e. a notice of opposition must be filed by a natural or legal person within nine months from the publication of the mention of grant of the European patent in the European Patent Bulletin (the start of the nine-month opposition period depends on the publication of the mention of grant of the European patent in the European Patent Bulletin, not on the publication of the specification of the European patent), and
- Rule 76(2)(c) EPC, i.e. the notice of opposition must contain a statement of the extent to which the European patent is opposed and of the grounds on which the opposition is based, as well as an indication of the facts and evidence presented in support of these grounds.

In addition, an opposition is also rejected as inadmissible if it fails to meet the requirements of Rule 76(2)(a), (b) and (d) EPC after the opponent was invited to remedy to these failures within a given time limit. If the opposition is not admissible, the opposition is rejected under Rule 77(1) or (2) EPC.

Inadmissible oppositions and oppositions which are deemed not to have been filed are not substantively examined (no examination on the merits). An opposition can only be rejected as inadmissible if the opposition has been first deemed to have been filed, and, if it is deemed to have been filed, the opposition exists, even if later the opposition is rejected as inadmissible. If an opposition is deemed not to have been filed, any opposition fee which has been paid is refunded. In contrast, if an opposition is rejected as inadmissible, an already paid opposition fee is not refunded.

=== Straw man ===
An opposition may be filed by a straw man to conceal the identity of the party actually interested in having the patent revoked. A strawman is "a party acting on behalf of another person." In 1999, the Enlarged Board of Appeal held that the use of a straw man did not render the opposition inadmissible unless "the involvement of the opponent is to be regarded as circumventing the law by abuse of process."

=== Filing of an opposition in common by a group of persons ===
An opposition may be jointly filed by more than one natural or legal persons. Such an opposition is admissible upon payment of a single opposition fee. It must, however, be "clear throughout the procedure who belongs to the group of common opponents".

== Substantive examination ==
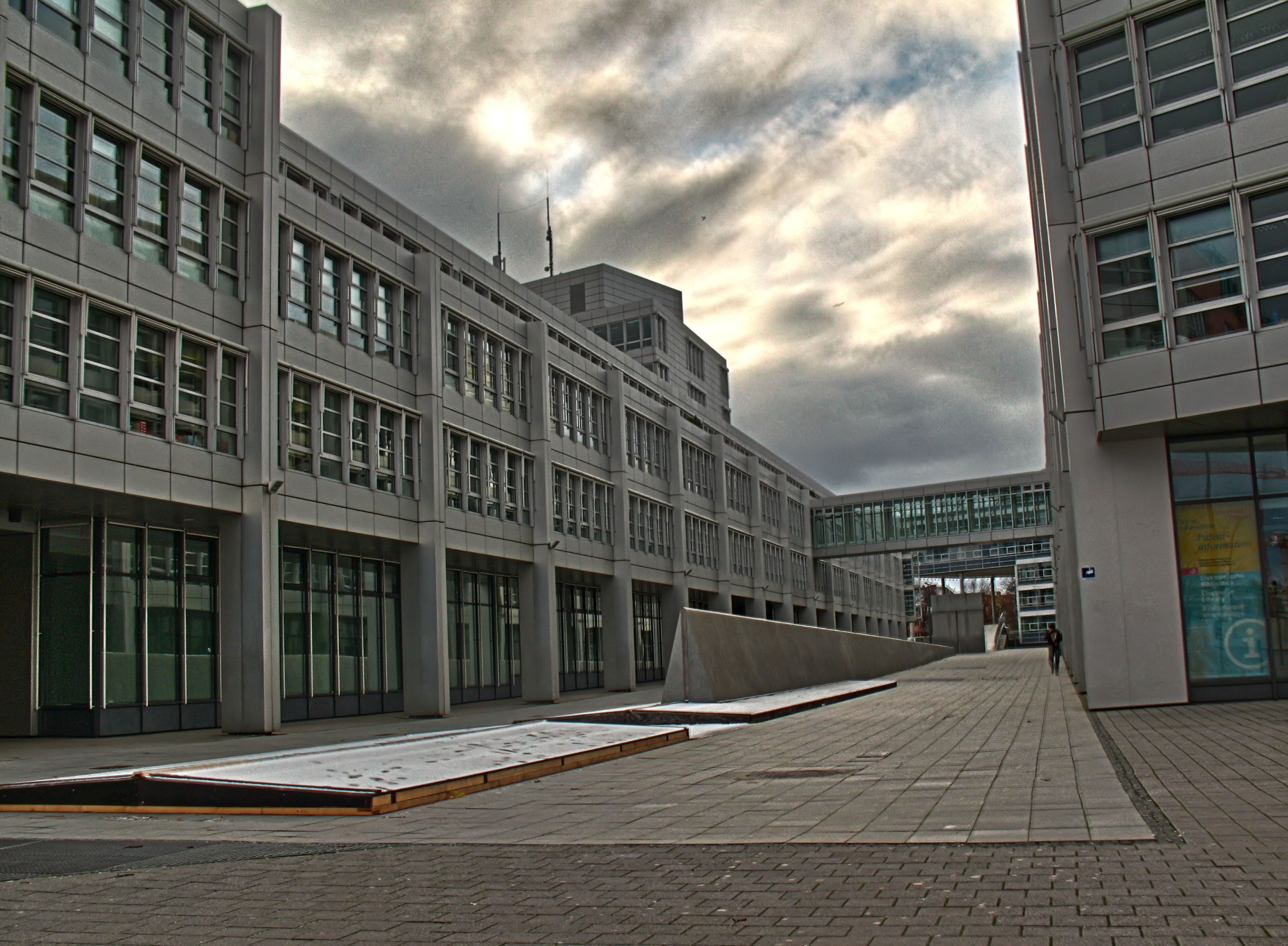
Buildings of the EPO in Munich where some oppositions are handled.

If the opposition is admissible, the Opposition Division examines the grounds for opposition as to their merits. In that examination, the Opposition Division is not limited "to the facts, evidence and arguments provided by the parties and the relief sought" but it examines "the facts of its own motion". The Opposition Division may even, of its own motion, raise a new ground for opposition that the opponent(s) did not raise in their notice of opposition. The Opposition Division may do so "if there are clear reasons to believe that such grounds are relevant and would in whole or in part prejudice the maintenance of the European patent", the underlying aim being to avoid "the maintenance of European patents which are invalid". The patent proprietor also has the opportunity to reply to the grounds of opposition. That is, the proprietor may submit arguments and, to a certain extent, amendments in reply thereto.

Thus, in view of the grounds of opposition, and in view for instance of a prior art document introduced into the proceedings by the opponent, the proprietor may amend the patent, i.e. the description, claims, and drawings thereof, although amendments may not be filed as of right at any stage during the opposition proceedings. The patent proprietor is master of its own patent in that the decision to amend or not, and how to amend the patent, is a decision of the proprietor alone (although the Opposition Division or the opponent may apply pressure to have amendments made). The patent, however, may not be amended in such a manner that the amendment would lead to an extension of the protection conferred by the patent.

If amendments are made to the patent during the opposition proceedings, the patent (and the invention to which it relates) must meet the requirements of the EPC. These requirements notably include the requirements of support in the description and clarity (Article 84 EPC), even though those are not listed as grounds of opposition in Article 100 EPC. (Note: See also decision T 936/04 of 24 April 2008 on whether the double patenting prohibition can be raised in opposition proceedings: "It is within the discretion of the instances of the EPO to raise the objection in opposition or opposition appeal proceedings against proposed amended claims, but this should be done only in clear cases" (catchword 1).) However, the requirements to be met by the amended patent do not include the requirement of unity of invention (because divisionals cannot be filed after grant).

During the opposition proceedings, oral proceedings may take place at the behest of the EPO or at the request of any party to the proceedings, i.e. the patentee or an opponent. The oral proceedings are held before the Opposition Division itself. They are held in Munich, the Hague or Berlin, and are public unless very particular circumstances apply. This contrasts with oral proceedings held before an Examining Division, which are not public. The list of public oral proceedings in opposition before the EPO is available on its web site. The right to oral proceedings is a specific and codified part of the procedural right to be heard. A decision is usually pronounced at the end of the oral proceedings, with reasons to follow in writing.

== Outcome and effects of the opposition ==
The opposition proceedings may have one of three outcomes:

- The patent is maintained, i.e. upheld, as granted. This is the outcome if the opposition is rejected or if the Opposition Division decides to discontinue the opposition proceedings. The Opposition Division may decide to discontinue the opposition proceedings notably if the sole opposition or all the oppositions have been withdrawn and the patent proprietor is therefore the only remaining party to the proceedings. The withdrawal of an opposition may result from a settlement reached between the proprietor and the opponent. The opposition proceedings may also be discontinued "[i]f the European patent has been surrendered in all the designated Contracting States or has lapsed in all those States".
- The patent is maintained, i.e. upheld, in an amended form. In this case, after the payment, by the patentee, of the fee for publishing a new specification (the so-called "B2 publication") and the filing of a translation of any amended claims into the two official languages of the EPO other than the language of procedure, the new patent specification is published.
- The patent is revoked. This is the most successful outcome for the opponent, although the maintenance of a patent in an amended form may also be regarded as a success.

The opposition has effect on all designated states in the European patent. Decisions by Opposition Divisions, like any other final decisions of first instance divisions, are appealable.

A decision of the EPO to revoke a European patent is final (when the opportunity to appeal before the EPO is exhausted), which makes the opposition proceedings at the EPO especially attractive for opponents. In contrast, a decision of the EPO not to revoke a European patent (the decision instead maintaining the patent as granted or in an amended form) leaves the way open for revocation by a national court or the Unified Patent Court (UPC). The EPO decision does not create an estoppel precluding a subsequent challenge by an unsuccessful opponent at the national level (at least before the English courts). The validity of a European patent can be scrutinised both at the national level, before a national court, and at the international level, before the European Patent Office during opposition or before the UPC. The same is not true for infringement proceedings, upon which national courts and the UPC exercise exclusive jurisdiction.

== Apportionment and fixing of costs ==
Each party to the opposition proceedings normally bears the costs it has incurred, unless the Opposition Division (or, in appeal proceedings, the Board of Appeal under Rule 100(1) EPC), for reasons of equity, orders a different apportionment of costs. For example, in case T 1306/05, a highly relevant document had been lately filed, without any valid justification, by the opponent during the oral proceedings before the Board of Appeal, thus rendering useless both the oral proceedings and the patent proprietor preparation thereto. A different apportionment of costs has been ordered by the Board of Appeal. The patent proprietor requested, under Rule 88(2) EPC and Rule 100 EPC, about €26,000 to be paid by the opponent.

During first instance proceedings, a decision on apportionment of costs forms part of the main decision of the Opposition Division. The main decision however only deals with the obligation on the party or parties concerned to bear costs (apportionment), whereas the actual amounts to be paid by one party to another are dealt with in another decision, namely a decision on the award (fixing) of costs. A decision on the award of costs is taken only after a decision apportioning the costs has been taken and if a request is submitted to that effect. When a Board of Appeal has to rule on an apportionment of costs, both the apportionment of costs and the fixing of costs to be apportioned are dealt with in a single decision.

== Transfer of opponent status ==
The opponent status cannot be freely transferred. As far as legal persons are concerned, the opposition can only be transferred or assigned to a third party together with the business assets belonging to a company, i.e. its economic activity, and more precisely the assets in the interests of which the opposition was filed. However, the status of an opponent passes to, i.e. is transmitted to, the opponent's universal successor in law in the case of a universal succession, such as for example in the case of a merger of two companies.

== Intervention and observations by third parties ==
=== Intervention under Article 105 EPC ===
Under Article 105 EPC, any third party may intervene in ongoing opposition proceedings after the 9-month opposition period has expired, if the third party proves that "(a) proceedings for infringement of the same patent have been instituted against him, or (b) following a request of the proprietor of the patent to cease alleged infringement, the third party has instituted proceedings for a ruling that he is not infringing the patent." In other words, a third party may intervene "if faced with an infringement action or allegation of infringement (...) instituted in a national jurisdiction under national law."

The admissibility of an intervention is subject to conditions. The so-called notice of intervention must inter alia be filed within three months of the date on which proceedings referred to in Article 105 are instituted. An admissible intervention is treated as an opposition. If the intervention is admissible, the intervener becomes party to the opposition proceedings. An intervention may be based on any ground for opposition under Article 100 EPC, and the intervener may also introduce new facts and arguments, which can therefore not be regarded as late filed.

The possibility to intervene not only exists during pending opposition proceedings before an Opposition Division (i.e., during the first instance proceedings), but also during subsequent pending appeal proceedings before a Board of Appeal (i.e., during the second instance proceedings). An intervener who intervened during appeal proceedings is, however, not treated as appellant, but merely as party as of right within the meaning of Article 107(second sentence) EPC. This has the consequence that, if the sole appellant withdraws their appeal, the appeal cannot continue with only an intervener who intervened during the appeal.

=== Observations by third parties under Article 115 EPC ===
Independently from the possibility to intervene in opposition proceedings (and then to become party to the proceedings), anyone may also file observations under Article 115 EPC. After publication of a European patent application, and a fortiori after grant of a European patent, anyone may file observations regarding the patentability of the invention which is the subject of the application (during examination proceedings) or patent (during opposition proceedings). In contrast to an intervener however, a person filing observations during opposition proceedings does not become party to the proceedings. This notably means that such person does not acquire the "bundle of procedural rights" created "in respect of the opponent", such as the right to be heard before any decision is taken. Observations by third parties, which must be filed in writing, may be filed by post or online. According to Board of Appeal 3.3.08, the observations have to be signed "in order to allow an identification of the third party" and, unless "adopted by a party to the proceedings as its own" or by the competent organ of the EPO of its own motion, "anonymous third party observations are to be disregarded altogether."

== Statistics, costs and duration ==
Overall, about 5.5-6% of the European patents granted by the European Patent Office are opposed. Of those, over the course of 1980–2005, about 1/3 were revoked, 1/3 were maintained in an amended form, which generally means "reduced in scope", and 1/3 were maintained as granted, that is, the opposition was rejected. The same figures were cited in 2013. The opposition rate (i.e. the number of oppositions filed per 100 granted patents) before the EPO is consistently higher in the closest available proxy for the pharmaceutical sector than it is in organic chemistry and in all sectors (overall EPO average). The success rate depends however on the technical area (i.e., on the IPC classes).

The main reasons for revocation of a patent in opposition are a lack of inventive step (43%), a lack of novelty (22%) and an extension beyond the content of the application as filed (11%).

Filing an opposition before the EPO is reportedly relatively affordable, "as the cost varies between €6000 and €50,000 (including patent lawyers’ fees)" (as of 2009). In contrast, the costs for litigating a European patent can be much higher ("For example, in Germany the total litigation costs can be as high as €2 million with €10 million at stake"). An opposition case is reported to take on average three years to be handled by the EPO.

== Parallel national or UPC proceedings ==
=== Parallel revocation proceedings ===
The "possibility of parallel validity proceedings in national courts and in the EPO is inherent in the legal arrangements in the EPC under which the EPO was established". If a party files an opposition to a European patent with the EPO, that party may in most countries (except in Germany) also, in parallel, initiate a revocation action (also called "nullity action" or "validity proceedings") against the same patent before a national court (or the UPC). In such a case, the national court (or the UPC) may, at least in England, exercise its discretion to either

- stay (i.e., suspend) the national proceedings (or the UPC proceedings), in order to wait the outcome of the EPO opposition proceedings, or
- allow the revocation proceedings to go ahead, without waiting the outcome of the EPO proceedings.

=== Parallel infringement proceedings ===
Further, the rules and practice differ from country to country in relation to infringement proceedings before national courts or the UPC in parallel to pending EPO opposition proceedings. "For example, as of 2008, Belgium and France will stay the main proceeding until a final decision has been reached by the EPO whereas in Germany, Italy, the Netherlands and in the United Kingdom such a stay is not automatic and in most cases the courts will continue the proceedings notwithstanding the opposition."

== Composition of an Opposition Division ==
According to Article 19(2) EPC, "[a]n Opposition Division shall consist of three technically qualified examiners, at least two of whom shall not have taken part in the proceedings for grant of the patent to which the opposition relates. An examiner who has taken part in the proceedings for the grant of the European patent may not be the Chairman." Violations of Article 19(2) EPC are considered to be substantial procedural violations. If an Opposition Division considers it necessary in a particular case, the Opposition Division may be enlarged by the addition of a legally qualified examiner (who cannot "have taken part in the proceedings for grant of the patent").

The same principles should constrain the composition of a Board of Appeal in opposition appeal proceedings vs. its composition in examination appeal proceedings in relation respectively to a European patent and the European patent application that gave rise to that patent.

== See also ==
- Inter partes review (U.S. patent law)
- Reexamination (U.S. patent law)
