= G 1/09 =

2010 decision by the European Patent Office

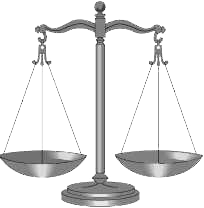
- Enlarged Board of Appeal of the European Patent Office
- Issued: 27 September 2010

Board composition
Chairman:	Peter Messerli
Members:	P. Alting van Geusau, S. Perryman, B. Schachenmann, J.-P. Seitz, J. M. Súarez Robledan, R. Young

Headword
- Pending application/SONY

G 1/09 is a decision issued on 27 September 2010 by the Enlarged Board of Appeal of the European Patent Office (EPO), holding that, following refusal of a European patent application, the application remains pending until the expiry of the time limit for filing a notice of appeal, so that a divisional application under Article 76 EPC may be filed even after the refusal of an application. More specifically, the divisional application may be filed until expiry of the time limit of two months for filing a notice of appeal under Article 108 EPC.

== Background ==
In the European Patent Convention (EPC), Article 76(1) EPC provides for the possibility for applicants to file a divisional application based on a European patent application. The European patent application based on which the divisional is filed is then called the "parent application". In accordance with Rule 36(1) EPC, a divisional application can only be filed when the parent application is still pending. However, the EPC does not define the concept of "pendency" of a European patent application. The question therefore arose as to whether a European patent application is still pending after the application has been refused. According to the EPO practice before G 1/09, a divisional application could no longer be filed after the application had been refused, i.e. after the date of notification (Rule 126(2) EPC) of the decision of refusal in written or oral proceedings.

== Referral ==
The referral lies from interlocutory decision J 2/08 by the Legal Board of Appeal (i.e. Board 3.1.01). In the case underlying J 2/08, the applicant had filed a divisional application between the announcement of the decision on refusal at the oral proceedings and the notification of the written decision, without filing an appeal against the refusal. The EPO's Receiving Section refused to allocate the filing date of the parent application to the divisional, and, in appeal, the Legal Board of Appeal, confronted with that situation, decided to refer the matter to the Enlarged Board of Appeal.

The referred question was:

Is an application which has been refused by a decision of the Examining Division thereafter still pending within the meaning of Rule 25 EPC 1973 (Rule 36(1) EPC) until the expiry of the time limit for filing a notice of appeal, when no appeal has been filed?

== Answer to the referred question ==
In its answer to the referred question, the Enlarged Board of Appeal ruled that "[i]n the case where no appeal is filed, a European patent application which has been refused by a decision of the Examining Division is thereafter pending within the meaning of Rule 25 EPC 1973 (Rule 36(1) EPC) until the expiry of the time limit for filing a notice of appeal." Although the operative part of the Enlarged Board of Appeal decision is limited to a refusal by the Examining Division, nothing else can apply in the case of a refusal by the Receiving Section.

The Enlarged Board of Appeal based its decision, inter alia, on its finding that a "pending" European patent application within the meaning of Rule 25 EPC 1973 (Rule 36(1) EPC) refers to a patent application "in a status in which substantive rights deriving therefrom under the EPC are (still) in existence". According to Article 67(4) EPC, substantive rights continue to exist until the European patent application was "finally refused", and, according to generally recognised principles of procedural law, a decision only becomes final, i.e. it only becomes res judicata, when the time limit for appeal has expired.

=== Obiter dictum ===
The Enlarged Board also confirmed, in an obiter dictum, the established practice of the EPO that a divisional application under Article 76 EPC may be filed until the day preceding the date of publication of the mention of grant of a patent in the European Patent Bulletin, but "normally" no longer on the date of publication of the mention of grant.

== Analysis ==
The decision of the Enlarged Board of Appeal simplifies the applicant's life in case of a refusal of a European patent application. Indeed, if the applicant does not wish to challenge the decision of refusal of the parent application, but wants to pursue another subject matter through a divisional application, the applicant no longer needs to lodge and substantiate an appeal for purely formal reasons, only to keep a time window open for filing a divisional application.
