= Term of patent in the United States =

Under United States patent law, the term of patent, provided that maintenance fees are paid on time, is 20 years from the filing date of the earliest U.S. or international application (that is to say, an application under the PCT system) to which priority is claimed (excluding provisional applications).

The patent term in the United States was changed in 1995 to bring U.S. patent law into conformity with the World Trade Organization's Agreement on Trade-Related Aspects of Intellectual Property Rights (TRIPS) as negotiated in the Uruguay Round. As a side effect, it is no longer possible to maintain submarine patents in the U.S., since the patent term now depends on the filing date, not the issue date.

Design patents have a shorter term than utility patents. Design patents filed on or after May 13, 2015, have a term of 15 years from issuance. Design patents filed prior to May 13, 2015, have a term of 14 years from issuance.

== History ==
The original patent term under the 1790 Patent Act was decided individually for each patent, but "not exceeding fourteen years". The 1836 Patent Act (5 Stat. 117, 119, 5) provided (in addition to the fourteen-year term) an extension "for the term of seven years from and after the expiration of the first term" in certain circumstances, when the inventor hasn't got "a reasonable remuneration for the time, ingenuity, and expense". In 1861 the seven-year extension was eliminated and the term changed to seventeen years (12 Stat. 246, 248). The enactment of the 1994 Uruguay Round Agreements Act then changed the patent term from seventeen years from the date of issue to the current twenty years from the earliest filing date.

Year filed	Maximum term of validity	Established by
-1789	-	-
1790–1835	14 years from issuance	Patent Act of 1790
1836–1860	21 years from issuance	Patent Act of 1836
1861–1994	17 years from issuance	Pub. L. 36–88 (12 Stat. 246)
1995-	20 years from filing	Uruguay Round Agreements Act

== Adjustments possible under current law ==
=== USPTO processing extension ===
If the United States Patent and Trademark Office (USPTO) fails to examine a patent application in time (deadlines for various steps are different), the patent term may be extended. Extensions or other delay taken by the applicant can reduce or eliminate the extension.

This extension is known as a patent term adjustment (PTA). Its intention is to accommodate for delays caused by the USPTO during the prosecution of a US patent application. The total PTA is an addition to the 20-year lifespan of a US patent. The delays are broadly classified into 4 types:

- Type A - this delay is caused when USPTO fails to reply within the time period provided, which is 14 months from filing of a non-provisional application for the First Office action, and within 4 months of receipt of an applicant response for all subsequent actions. Failing to this condition, type A delay will accounted.
- Type B - USPTO estimates the normal prosecution period of an application to be 3 years, i.e. between the date of filing a non-provisional application and the issue of the patent. If the prosecution exceeds this time, then Type B delay come into place. Type B delay will calculated if no RCE (Request For Continued Examination) is filed prior to completion of 3-year period. If the first RCE is filed after 3-year period then type B delay will be calculated up to the date of filing of RCE.
- Type C - This type of delay is calculated in the events of secrecy orders or interferences.
- Applicant delay - Applicant delay occurs when the applicant fails to respond to the office action within 3 months of mailing of an office action. Applicants delays are subtracted from the USPTO delays, when calculating the term adjustment.
- Notably, patent term adjustment is not available for divisional (and other continuing) patents issued from the same priority application (see Mohsenzadeh v. Lee, 790 F. 3d 1377 - Court of Appeals, Federal Circuit 2015)

Calculation:

- Type A delay = Date of issuance of office Action -(Date of receipt of applicant response + 4 months/14 months)
- Type B delay = Date of issue of patent/Date of filing of first RCE - (Date of filing of application + 3 years)
- Total PTA =Type A+Type B + Type C - Applicant delay - overlapping delays
- In the US, the Food and Drug Administration (FDA) can provide additional market exclusivity (beyond the term of the patents) in cases where introduction of a product into a market was caused by the FDA approval process.

=== Reissue and reexamination ===
Even if the scope of a patent is narrowed, neither reissue nor reexamination changes the original expiration date. A reissued or reexamined patent expires on the day the original granted patent would have ordinarily expired. Example: The validity of a patent (filing: January 1, 2000; issue: January 1, 2002; end: January 1, 2020) is challenged. The USPTO issues a Certificate of Reexamination on January 1, 2004. The reexamined patent is in force until January 1, 2020, assuming payment of all maintenance fees.

=== FDA approval extension ===
The Drug Price Competition and Patent Term Restoration Act (Hatch-Waxman Act) of 1984 provides patent holders on approved patented products with an extended term of protection under the patent to compensate for the delay in obtaining Food and Drug Administration (FDA) approval.

Merck & Co., Inc. v. Hi-Tech Pharmacal Co., Inc. ruled that patents extended under Hatch-Waxman are still eligible to URAA term extension. However, patents in force on June 8, 1995, solely because of the Hatch-Waxman term adjustment are not eligible.

Patent Term Adjustment (PTA) and Patent Term Extension (PTE) compensate a patent applicant for delays that occur during patent prosecution. Patent Term Adjustment (PTA) (see above) compensates applicants for USPTO-caused delays; Patent Term Extension (PTE) compensates a patent owner for delays caused by the regulatory review (e.g. by FDA) before a product can be commercially marketed. PTA and PTE lengthen the term of the patent, theoretically permitting patent owners to enjoy more than 20-year patent term from the time of first non-provisional filing.

=== Terminal disclaimer ===
A terminal disclaimer is a process by which a patent's term is shortened because it duplicates the claims of another patent which expires sooner. If any claim of a pending patent application would have been obvious in light of at least one claim of the applicant's issued patents, the USPTO may reject that claim for obviousness-type double patenting and require the applicant to disclaim a part of the term of the pending application. For example, an applicant's patent A expires on December 24, 2000. The applicant filed another patent application two years later. Under some conditions, the second patent might expire later than the first (based upon the respective earliest claimed priority dates). If the applicant is required to file, and does file, a terminal disclaimer in the later filed patent, then the later filed patent will expire at the same time as the earlier filed patent, the extra term having been disclaimed ("terminal disclaimer"). In filing the terminal disclaimer, the later filed patent and the earlier filed patent must be, and remain, commonly owned. In the case of co-pending applications, either or both of the applications may have claims rejected for obviousness-type double patenting, and a terminal disclaimer may be required in either or both, in which case the earlier expiration date will control.

After the Uruguay Round Agreements Act of 1994 (URAA), some patents with terminal disclaimers were eligible for a term adjustment because their referenced patents received a term adjustment under the URAA. Patents whose parents received extensions were eligible to file to receive a similar extension, because the claims they depended on were still protected. This has been discussed in the Manual of Patent Examining Procedure.

A terminal disclaimer does not negate Patent Term Extension that has been granted under 35 U.S.C. 156. In a pharmaceutical patent dispute, Teva argued that Wyeth's patent on zaleplon drug products (Sonata) had expired because of a terminal disclaimer. Wyeth (and its exclusive licensee King) argued that patent's term was ongoing because of a Patent Term Extension due to FDA regulatory review delay. Under 35 U.S.C. 156(a), the term of a patent "shall be extended" after a series of provisions are satisfied. The district court found the language of the statute unambiguous and gives the court "no discretion".

Thus, if the enumerated conditions are satisfied, the patentee is entitled to a term extension calculated pursuant to Section 156. Teva's motion to dismiss was consequently denied because "a terminally disclaimed patent is eligible for extension under [Section] 156." The case is interesting because the patentee in the first instance had expressly disclaimed term subsequent to 2003 to get the patent granted. However, the holding of this case does not apply to Patent Term Adjustment granted under 35 U.S.C. 154. Such term adjustments will be subject to any terminal disclaimer that has been filed.

There is now a similar case wherein a company was given extension under S.156 and the generic entrant arguing against such extension between Merck and Hi-tech for the drug dorzolamide (Trusopt). Here too, the first company (Merck) had filed a standard form terminal disclaimer. This patent was later given an extension and became the crux of the litigation.

== See also ==
- Supplementary protection certificate
