= Unity of invention =

Concept in patent law

In most patent laws, unity of invention is a formal administrative requirement that must be met for a patent application to proceed to grant. An issued patent can claim only one invention or a group of closely related inventions. The purpose of this requirement is administrative as well as financial. The requirement serves to preclude the possibility of filing one patent application for several inventions, while paying only one set of fees (filing fee, search fee, examination fee, renewal fees, and so on). Unity of invention also makes the classification of patent documents easier.

The WIPO and the EPO determine the unity of claims in a patent based on the presence of a common "special technical feature", which is usually equated with inventive step. On the other hand, the USPTO uses for its domestic applications a very different approach ("independent or distinct"), which is based on the fields of use for each claim, justifying this approach by a "burden on the examiner" to search different areas of technology. The patent offices in Japan and China, similarly to the USPTO, also demand splitting patent applications into multiple divisionals as a means of increasing the monetary revenue of the offices.

When a patent application is objected to on the ground of a lack of unity, it may be still considered for patent protection, unlike for example in the case where the invention is found to be lacking novelty. A divisional application can usually be filed for the second invention, and for the further inventions, if any. Alternatively, the applicant may counterargue that there is unity of invention.

== Jurisdictions ==
=== European Patent Convention ===
Under European patent practice and case law, lack of unity (of invention) can appear either "a priori", before the prior art was examined, or "a posteriori", after the prior art was examined. An a posteriori lack of unity usually results from a lack of novelty or inventive step of the subject-matter of one independent claim.

=== Patent Cooperation Treaty ===
Under the Patent Cooperation Treaty (PCT), an international application, also called PCT application, "shall relate to one invention only or to a group of inventions so linked as to form a "single general inventive concept". If the requirement of unity of invention is not met, the International Searching Authority (ISA) (i.e., the patent office in charge of carrying out the international search) "is entitled to request the applicant to pay an additional search fee for each invention beyond the first which is to be searched".

In reaction to such a request from the ISA, the applicant may pay all or some of the requested additional search fees, and the ISA then establishes the international search for all or some of the inventions or groups of inventions, respectively. The applicant may also decide not to pay any of the additional search fees, and, in such case, the ISA does not carry out a search for the inventions or groups of inventions for which no search fees have been paid. The international search report (ISR) is then established only for the first claimed invention.

If the applicant disagrees with the ISA's finding of lack of unity of invention, the additional fees may be paid under protest. In the protest procedure, the applicant files a reasoned statement explaining why it considers that the requirement of unity of invention has been complied with, or that the number of additional fees required is excessive. After payment of the additional search fees and, if required, of a protest fee, the protest is examined by a review body. If the review body finds the protest justified, it orders the total or partial reimbursement of the additional search fees, and, if applicable, the protest fee, to the applicant. When, for instance, the European Patent Office acts as ISA, the review body in charge of examining the protest consists of three members: "the head of a directorate, normally the head of the directorate by which the invitation to pay additional fees was issued, an examiner with special expertise in unity of invention and, normally, the examiner who issued the invitation."

=== United States ===
Although U.S. patent law does not use the term "unity of invention", the relevant legislative act (Title 35 of the US Code: 35 U.S.C. §121) specifies the conditions under which the patent examiner may issue a "restriction requirement", i.e. requesting a split:

If two or more independent and distinct inventions are claimed in one application, the Director may require the application to be restricted to one of the inventions.

Applications that claim more than one distinct invention may be subject to restriction to a single invention, and the applicant may prosecute the remaining invention(s) by filing divisional applications.

35 U.S.C. 121 Divisional applications.

If two or more independent and distinct inventions are claimed in one application, the Director may require the application to be restricted to one of the inventions. If the other invention is made the subject of a divisional application, which complies with the requirements of section 120, it shall be entitled to the benefit of the filing date of the original application. A patent issuing on an application with respect to which a requirement for restriction under this section has been made, or on an application filed as a result of such a requirement, shall not be used as a reference either in the Patent and Trademark Office or in the courts against a divisional application or against the original application or any patent issued on either of them, if the divisional application is filed before the issuance of the patent on the other application. The validity of a patent shall not be questioned for failure of the Director to require the application to be restricted to one invention.

However, the Manual of Patent Examining Procedure (MPEP), a document written by the USPTO itself, replaced 'independent and distinct' with 'independent or distinct'. The USPTO justified this "and for or" replacement, by stating

The terms "independent" (i.e., unrelated) and "distinct" (i.e. related by patentably distinct) have mutually exclusive meanings and thus are interpreted as alternative requirements. Only one these requirements must be met in order to support a restriction.

Thus, according to MPEP, the claims in a patent application may be properly restricted to (i.e. split into) two or more divisional patent applications, if the claims (i.e. claimed inventions) are either independent (MPEP § 802.01, § 806.06, and § 808.01) or distinct (MPEP § 806.05 - § 806.05(j)).

After this split of the independent and distinct requirements, the MPEP adds a new definition of independent and of distinct, which are based on the field of use – a criterion never mentioned in legislative documents:

Distinctness is proven if the claims to the intermediate and final products do not overlap in scope (i.e., a claim to the final product does not read on the intermediate, and vice versa) and are not obvious variants and it can be shown that the intermediate product is useful other than to make the final product.

There are two criteria for a proper restriction requirement in case of patentably distinct inventions:

(A) The inventions must be independent (see MPEP § 802.01, § 806.06, § 808.01) or distinct as claimed (see MPEP § 806.05 - § 806.05(j)); and

(B) There would be a serious search and/or examination burden on the examiner if restriction is not required (see MPEP § 803.02, § 808, and § 808.02)

The USPTO provides several examples that explained in greater details its current restriction practice based on one-way and two-way distinctions.

Briefly, the two main substantial differences between EPO's/WIPO's unity of invention and the USPTO's restriction requirement is that:

(1) The USPTO's approach to "independent and distinct" inventions is different from the "unity of invention" of the EPO's and WIPO's approach. Whereas the EPO would consider claims as relating to the same invention, if the claims share a "special technical feature" over prior art (e.g. have a common inventive step), the USPTO can find the lack of unity in the same application, if the two alleged inventions can be used not only in combination with each other, or because of several fields of use (purposes) of the invention.

This difference results in a multi-fold larger number of restriction requirements issued by the USPTO compared to the EPO, Intellectual Property Office (United Kingdom), German Patent and Trade Mark Office, National Institute of Industrial Property (France), JPO and CNIPA, that originate from the same Paris Convention or Patent Cooperation Treaty (PCT) priority application.

The US "independent and distinct" approach has an advantage, that it can be used before substantial examination, i.e. before an inventive step is identified.

(2) There is no judicial review of the restriction requirement in the US (a petition to the USPTO Director is the only available remedy, which are never granted). This is an unusual situation for a generally litigious US justice system. Many American patent practitioners believe, that the broad discretion given to the USPTO and the lack of judicial review on the issues of unity of invention, allow patent examiners to cynically "issue knee-jerk restriction requirements due to incentives at the USPTO to increase revenue or for examiners to perform less work for the same credit." This policy causes delays in examination and unfairly extends the patent monopoly due to multiple patents (which cover the same invention) with different expiration dates (because each of these divisional patents ends up with a different patent term extension).

On the other hand, the current restriction practice allows the USPTO to raise its revenue with only minuscule increase in its efforts: the patent applicant has to pay to filing, examination, issuance and maintenance of each divisional patent application separately, even though the patent examiner reads exactly the same text in each of the divisionals. In 2003 the Biotechnology Industry Organization urged the USPTO to change its restriction practice because some applicants were forced to spend $500,000 "to fully protect a single invention" due to numerous divisionals. Most of this money goes to lawyers for prosecuting multiple divisionals, and not to the USPTO. Also, in contrast to the USPTO fees, small businesses do not receive any discounts on lawyers' fees, and such excessive amounts prohibit small businesses from getting proper protection of their IP.

==== More detailed description ====
The MPEP discusses four situations where an examiner may issue a "restriction requirement", i.e. a split a patent application into two or more divisionals, because even though the inventions are related (i.e. not independent) they are distinct in one or more of the following four cases:

(1) wherein at least one invention is patentable (novel and nonobvious) over the other (though they may each be unpatentable over the prior art)- i.e. the inventions in question have different inventive steps:

(A) Two different combinations, not disclosed as capable of use together, having different modes of operation, different functions and different effects are independent. An article of apparel and a locomotive bearing would be an example. A process of painting a house and a process of boring a well would be a second example.
(B) Where the two inventions are process and apparatus, and the apparatus cannot be used to practice the process or any part thereof, they are independent. A specific process of molding is independent from a molding apparatus that cannot be used to practice the specific process.

Alternatively, "Election of species should not be required between claimed species that are considered clearly unpatentable (obvious) over each other."

This approach is similar to those of WIPO and the European Patent Office (see PCT and EPO sections above). A serious drawback of this approach is that "at the time of restriction (i.e. before the obviousness analysis), whether the inventions are patentably distinct is not known". For this reason this approach is not often used by the USPTO.

(2) the inventions as claimed are not connected in at least one of design, operation, or effect (e.g., can be made by, or used in, a materially different process) - i.e. alternative uses/methods. The term "distinct inventions" means here that related (i.e. not "independent") concepts (such as apparatus for charging the disclosed battery, an apparatus for discharging the battery, a material to make an electrode for the battery) would be considered "distinct inventions" if they can be used not only in a combination with each other.

An example of such restriction requirement is: the inventions as claimed are not connected in at least one of design, operation, or effect (e.g., can be made by, or used in, a materially different process) - i.e. alternative uses/methods. The term "distinct inventions" means here that related (i.e. not "independent") concepts (such as apparatus for charging the disclosed battery, an apparatus for discharging the battery, a material to make an electrode for the battery) would be considered "distinct inventions" if they can be used not only in a combination with each other. An example of such restriction requirement is:

The examiner noted that Inventions I and II are related as a method and apparatus for its practice, respectively. The examiner further noted that Invention I and Invention II are distinct, if either:

1. The method (Invention II) as claimed can be practiced by another and materially different apparatus or by hand, or
2. The apparatus (Invention I) as claimed can be used to practice another and materially different method or by hand.

The "independent inventions" approach, as shown in the previous paragraph, implies that both the field of use and the inventive step of the two inventions are different. However, as explained below, in the USPTO's current practice either the field of use or the inventive step of the two inventions suffice to be different to find the lack of unity.

Nevertheless, the MPEP provides an exception similar to the EPO/WIPO approach: "If there is an express admission that the claimed inventions would have been obvious over each other within the meaning of 35 U.S.C. 103 restriction should not be required."

In a pharmaceutical context, restriction requirement is usually issued to divide claims directed to the drug as a composition-of-matter, claims directed to methods of preparing the drug, and claims directed to a method for using the drug in treatment. In biotech, US examiners often divide claims on a DNA gene, on mRNA, on complementary DNA, on a method of using the gene and on a corresponding protein into separate divisional applications.

(3) if two claimed species are mutually exclusive (i.e. if one claim recites limitations disclosed for a first species but not a second, while a second claim recites limitations disclosed only for the second species and not the first). "The claims must not overlap in scope."

(4) finally, an examiner can present an "undue burden" argument to justify her restriction requirement: "there would be a serious search burden as evidenced by separate classification, status, or field of search and/or a serious examination burden as evidenced by non-prior art issues relevant to one invention that are not relevant to the other invention." A serious search burden can be evidenced by separate classification, status, or field of search. A serious examination burden can be evidenced by, for example, non-prior art issues relevant to one invention that are not relevant to the other invention.

Similar arguments apply to the analysis of whether combination and subcombination (see MPEP § 806.05 (combination and subcombination) and § 806.05(j) (related products or related processes)) are distinct:

The inventions are distinct if it can be shown that a combination as claimed:

(A) does not require the particulars of the subcombination as claimed for patentability (to show novelty and non-obviousness), and

(B) the subcombination can be shown to have utility either by itself or in another materially different combination.

(5) notably, the USPTO allows more generous grouping of species in Markush claim: i.e. "(a) the members of the Markush group share a "single structural similarity," and (b) the members share a common use," than it does for different types of claims (i.e. process, apparatus and product) in the same patent.

A restriction requirement can be appealed to a USPTO Division Director, but not to a judge. In practise, the Director never reverses the restriction requirement. It is also advised that inventors/applicants do not split their applications themselves, but rather always wait for an examiner to issue a "restriction". Such restriction, issued by an examiner, provides a safe harbor provision of 5 U.S.C. §121 against future accusations of double patenting. Otherwise, the applicant can be accused of double patenting later, and have her patents revoked. The problem of using two different standards for obviousness-type double patenting (i.e."independent and distinct" at the USPTO and "patentably distinct" in the courts) was mostly rectified by the Safe Harbor provision of the Patent Act of 1952.

==== International (Patent Cooperation Treaty) applications in the US ====
The analysis used to determine whether the Office may require restriction differs in national stage applications submitted under 35 U.S.C. 371 (unity of invention analysis) as compared to national applications filed under 35 U.S.C. 111(a) (independent and distinct analysis). This difference was confirmed in 1986 by a US Federal Court, which found that when the USPTO acts as an International Searching Authority (ISA), the USPTO is required to use the PCT rules rather than US domestic rules.

If the USPTO issues a divisional restriction while serving as an International Searching Authority (ISA) under the Patent Cooperation Treaty, this restriction would not shield the applicant's US patents from double-patenting accusation later in the national stage of the PCT. Only restrictions issued by the USPTO in a national stage provide immunity from double-patenting.

Noteworthy, the 2023 USPTO guidelines require patent examiners to apply the PCT-style unity of invention requirement to the PCT applications that enter the National stage in the US, rather than the "independent or distinct" requirement. Thus, the PCT route is recommended for applicants who are concerned with the cost of numerous divisionals and with potential double patenting accusations in the future.
