= G 2/10 =

2011 decision by the Enlarged Board of Appeal of the European Patent Office

G 2/10
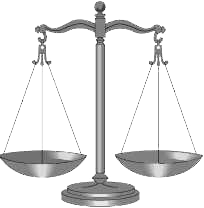

Enlarged Board of Appeal of the European Patent Office

Issued 30 August 2011
Board composition

Chairman: Peter Messerli
Members: A. S. Clelland, B. Günzel, U. Oswald, B. Schachenmann, J.-P. Seitz, A. Wirén

Headword

Disclaimer/SCRIPPS

G 2/10 is a decision issued on 30 August 2011 by the Enlarged Board of Appeal of the European Patent Office (EPO) on the subject of disclosed disclaimers. It lies from decision T 1068/07 by Technical Board of Appeal 3.3.08, who referred a question to the Enlarged Board.

The referred question was:

Does a disclaimer infringe Article 123(2) EPC if its subject-matter was disclosed as an embodiment of the invention in the application as filed?

In its answer to the referred question, the Enlarged Board of Appeal ruled that "an amendment to a claim by the introduction of a disclaimer disclaiming from it subject-matter disclosed in the application as filed infringes Article 123(2) EPC if the subject-matter remaining in the claim after the introduction of the disclaimer is not, be it explicitly or implicitly, directly and unambiguously disclosed to the skilled person using common general knowledge, in the application as filed." The Enlarged Board of Appeal also ruled that "Determining whether or not that is the case requires a technical assessment of the overall technical circumstances of the individual case under consideration, taking into account the nature and extent of the disclosure in the application as filed, the nature and extent of the disclaimed subject-matter and its relationship with the subject-matter remaining in the claim after the amendment."
