= Electronic Filing System (USPTO) =

Electronic Filing System of the United States Patent and Trademark Office (USPTO), also referred to as EFS-Web or simply EFS, was a web-based system for submitting patent applications and related documents electronically.

All users could file new applications for accelerated examination, design patents, design patent reissues, international applications for filing in the US receiving office, provisional applications, reexamination requests, utility patents under 35 U.S.C. § 111(a), utility patent reissues, U.S. National Stage applications under 35 U.S.C. § 371, ASCII text files (for sequence listings, computer listings, mega tables, mathematical formulae, chemical formulae, and 3D protein crystal structures), and petitions under 37 C.F.R. § 1.378(c). Applications must be in PDF format.

Users who have registered could also file follow-on documents and/or fees for previously filed applications, and pre-grant publications.

After filing via EFS, users were sent an electronic receipt that acknowledges the submission date. Submissions are available for viewing on Private PAIR within hours of submission.

EFS was retired after November 8, 2023, in favor of the USPTO Patent Center.

== See also ==
- Epoline, a set of web-based computer programs and services operated by the European Patent Office (EPO)
