= Unity of invention under the European Patent Convention =

Under Article 82 EPC, a European patent application must "...relate to one invention only or to a group of inventions so linked as to form a single general inventive concept." This legal provision is the application, within the European Patent Convention, of the requirement of unity of invention, which also applies also in other jurisdictions.

The lack of unity or non-unity (of invention) can appear either a priori, i.e., before taking into account the prior art, or a posteriori, i.e., after taking into account the prior art. An a posteriori lack of unity usually results from a lack of novelty or inventive step of the subject-matter of one independent claim.

== Unity amongst a group of inventions ==
When a European patent application claims a group of inventions, "unity of invention" is considered present if "...there is a technical relationship among those inventions involving one or more of the same or corresponding special technical features." There are 3 approaches that EPO examiners used in practice, and they all focus on an idea of a single general inventive concept, which usually can be equated with an inventive step.

== Search phase ==
If, when carrying out a search, the search division considers that the application lacks unity (i.e., it doesn't meet the provisions of Article 82), a partial search report is established. The EPO then requires one or more further search fees for the other identified inventions, or groups of inventions, that the search may cover.

The former time limit for paying the further search fees was a period the EPO specified as between two weeks and six weeks. Under new Rule 64 EPC, in force as of April 1, 2010, the time limit for the further search fees is now two months.

== Interactions between search and examination phases ==
Responsibility for establishing whether or not a European patent application meets the requirements of unity of invention ultimately rests with the examining division.

Therefore, the findings of the search division—that the application lacks unity—may be contested before the examining division, during the examination phase. If successful, and if further search fees were paid during the search phase, the further search fees may be refunded. If successful, and if further search fees had not been paid during the search phase, "...the applicant is entitled as of right to have the whole subject-matter of his unitary invention searched."

== Examination phase ==
Under the former version of Rule 36 EPC, an objection of lack of unity of invention raised in a communication of the Examining Division could trigger a 24-month period for filing a divisional application, if the particular objection was raised for the first time. However, under the amended version of Rule 36 EPC which came into effect in April 2014, divisional applications can be filed at any time provided that the parent European application is still pending.
