= Patent Act of 1922 =

- Long title: An Act To increase the force and salaries in the Patent Office, and for other purposes
- Nicknames: The Lampert Patent Office Bill
- Enacted by: the 67th United States Congress
- Effective: February 18, 1922

Citations
- Public law: Public Law 67-147
- Statutes at Large: 42 Stat. 392

Codification
- Acts amended: Patent Act of 1870, Revised Statutes §§ 440, 477, 4921

Legislative history
- Introduced in the House of Representatives as H.R. 7077 by Florian Lampert (R‑WI) on June 10, 1921; Committee consideration by House Committee on Patents; Passed the House of Representatives on January 12, 1922 (305–40); Passed the Senate on February 14, 1922 (Voice vote); Signed into law by President Warren G. Harding on February 18, 1922

Major amendments
- Patent Act of 1952

The Patent Act of 1922 began circulating general information about how to acquire a patent to the general public as a means of spurring private invention initiatives.

The law also enlarged the jurisdiction of the Court of Customs and Patent Appeals to include appeals on questions of law from Tariff Commission findings in proceedings relating to unfair practices in the import trade.

The Commissioner of Patents was given the power to require patent agents and patent attorneys to have certain qualifications before being allowed to practice before the Patent Office. He was also authorized to suspend or disbar such persons for cause. The salaries of the Commissioner and other officers of the Patent Office were increased, and 49 more positions were created on the technical staff.

The fee for filing a patent application was increased from $15 to $20. The office of Patent Solicitor was created by the act.
