= Disclosure of the invention under the European Patent Convention =

Article 83 of the European Patent Convention (EPC) relates to the disclosure of the invention under the European Patent Convention. This legal provision prescribes that a European patent application must disclose the invention (which is the subject of the European patent application) in a manner sufficiently clear and complete for it to be carried out by a person skilled in the art.

== Basic principles ==
To comply with Article 83 EPC, a European patent application must contain sufficient information to allow a person skilled in the art, using his common general knowledge and the information provided in the application, to perceive the technical teaching inherent in the claimed invention and to put it into effect accordingly. In other words, the disclosure of the invention must be reproducible without undue burden, and this must be true over the whole scope of the claim. Further, even if an invention "requires a certain amount of experimentation by the skilled person to carry it out", the invention may still be considered as sufficiently disclosed "as long as this experimentation is not an undue burden on the skilled person".

In the context of assessing sufficiency of disclosure, the EPO considers that, although a claim must be construed with a mind willing to understand, this does not require that a technically broad but clear term be interpreted more narrowly in the light of a limiting feature mentioned only in the description.

The requirement of sufficiency of disclosure must be complied with as from the date of filing because a deficiency in a European patent application as filed, consisting in an insufficient identification of the subject-matter claimed, cannot subsequently be cured without offending against Article 123(2) EPC, which provides that the subject-matter content of a European patent application as filed may not be extended.

An insufficiently clear and complete disclosure of the invention is a ground of opposition, and revocation.

== Violation of the generally accepted laws of physics ==
Although the European Patent Convention does not exclude the patenting of "revolutionary" inventions,

the provisions of Article 83 EPC require that the European patent application shall disclose the invention in a manner sufficiently clear and complete for it to be carried out by the skilled person and that, in particular "if the invention seems, at least at first, to offend against the generally accepted laws of physics and established theories, the disclosure should be detailed enough to prove to a skilled person conversant with mainstream science and technology that the invention is indeed feasible (i.e. susceptible of industrial application). This implies, inter alia, the provision of all the data which the skilled person would need to carry out the claimed invention, since such a person, not being able to derive such data from any generally accepted theory, cannot be expected to implement the teaching of the invention just by trial and error".

== Burden of proof in opposition ==
The burden of proof generally lies upon an opponent to establish insufficiency of disclosure. However, "when the patent does not give any information of how a feature of the invention can be put into practice" and if the opponent plausibly argues that "common general knowledge would not enable the skilled person to put this feature into practice", the burden of proof can be shifted to the patentee to show that "common general knowledge would indeed enable the skilled person to carry out the invention."

== Relationship between Articles 83 and 84 EPC ==
Depending upon the circumstances, an ambiguity in the claims (i.e. a lack of clarity under Article 84 EPC) may very well lead to an insufficiency objection. As held in decision T 608/07 of 27 April 2009 (in opposition appeal proceedings),

"[it] should be born in mind that [such an] ambiguity also relates to the scope of the claims, ie Article 84 EPC. Since, however, Article 84 EPC is in itself not a ground of opposition, care has to be taken that an insufficiency objection arising out of an ambiguity is not merely a hidden objection under Article 84 EPC. (...) [For] an insufficiency arising out of ambiguity it is not enough to show that an ambiguity exists, eg at the edges of the claims. It will normally be necessary to show that the ambiguity deprives the person skilled in the art of the promise of the invention. It goes without saying that this delicate balance between Article 83 and 84 EPC has to be assessed on the merits of each individual case."

That a lack of clarity in the claims may, in some cases, result in an insufficient disclosure of the invention has been also pointed out by Board 3.2.05 in decision T 1811/13 of 8 November 2016. The Board explained however that:

"(...) in such a case it is not sufficient to establish that a claim lacks clarity, but it is necessary to establish that the application or patent, as the case may be, does not disclose the invention in a manner sufficiently clear and complete for it to be carried out by a person skilled in the art. In other words, it is not sufficient to establish a lack of clarity of the claims for establishing lack of compliance with Article 83 EPC (...); it is necessary to show that the lack of clarity affects the patent as a whole (i.e. not only the claims) and that it is such that the skilled person - who can avail himself of the description and his common general knowledge - is hindered from carrying out the invention (...)."

== Implementing regulations, especially Rule 42 EPC ==
Rule 42 EPC specifies the content of the description of a European patent application and constitutes an implementing rule of Article 83 EPC. Rule 42(1)(e) EPC (previously Rule 27(1)(e) EPC 1973) notably specifies that "[the] description shall ... describe in detail at least one way of carrying out the invention claimed, using examples where appropriate and referring to the drawings, if any." In that respect,

"[the] jurisprudence of the boards of appeal draws a clear distinction between the concepts of "way of carrying out the invention claimed" and "examples" referred to in [Rule 42(1)(e) EPC]. ... the detailed description of one way of carrying out the invention claimed has to be interpreted in the light of Article 83 EPC. It constitutes a condition to be met by the description as a whole and is clearly mandatory. In contrast, the presence of examples would only be indispensable if the description would otherwise not be sufficient to meet this requirement. Hence, the purpose of the "examples" evoked in [Rule 42(1)(e) EPC] appears primarily to be to complete an otherwise incomplete teaching."
