= Patent Act of 1952 =

- Long title: An Act to revise and codify the laws relating to patents and the Patent Office, and to enact into law title 35 of the United States Code entitled "Patents".
- Enacted by: the 82nd United States Congress
- Effective: January 1, 1953

Citations
- Public law: 82–593
- Statutes at Large: 66 Stat. 792

Codification
- Titles amended: 35 U.S.C.

Legislative history
- Introduced in the House as H.R. 7794 by Joseph Raleigh Bryson on May 12, 1952; Committee consideration by House Committee on the Judiciary (Subcommittee No. 3); Passed the House on May 19, 1952; Passed the Senate on July 4, 1952; Signed into law by President Harry S. Truman on July 19, 1952

The Patent Act of 1952 clarified and simplified existing U.S. patent law. It also effected substantive changes, including the codification of the requirement for non-obviousness and the judicial doctrine of contributory infringement. As amended, it is codified in Title 35 of the United States Code.

== Provisions ==
The Act originally divided the patent law into three parts:

Part I — Patent and Trademark Office
contains provisions governing that Office, its powers and duties, and related matters.
Part II — Patentability of Invention and Grant of Patents
sets out when and how patents may be obtained.
Part III — Patents and Protection of Patent Rights
relates to the patents themselves and the protection of rights under patents.

A later amendment added

Part IV — Patent Cooperation Treaty
Intended to simplify the filing of patent applications for an invention in different countries, the Patent Cooperation Treaty, signed by 35 countries by December 31, 1970, provides (inter alia) centralized filing procedures and a standardized application format. It helps expand established programs of American industry to file foreign patent applications, and encourages smaller businesses and individual investors to become more active in seeking patent protection abroad.

Other amendments to Title 35 concern the renaming from "Patent Office" to "Patent and Trademark Office"; revised fee schedules for application and issue of patents; and modifications in procedures related to the protection of patents.

§ 121 of the Patent Act of 1952 was the first time, when the US Congress addressed the problem of double patenting. Prior to 1952, even when a patent examiner required splitting a patent application into several divisionals, the resulting divisionals were used against each other in courts as grounds for double patenting invalidation. This was an unfair practice to patent owners, who were faced with a loss-loss situation. The Congress did away with the problem, adding § 121, which provides that, when an inventor files a divisional application in response to a restriction requirement, one restricted application “shall not be used as a reference” against the other.

== See also ==
- Patent Act of 1790
- Patent Act of 1836
- Patent Act of 1922
- Leahy–Smith America Invents Act
