= PCT Gazette =

The PCT Gazette is a weekly bilingual publication of the World Intellectual Property Organization (WIPO). It is published by the International Bureau of WIPO pursuant to Article 55 of the Patent Cooperation Treaty (PCT), which provides a system for filing international (patent) applications. The Gazette contains among other things bibliographic data of international applications when published and notices concerning changes to fees, legal provisions and Office procedures relating to the PCT.

The first issue of the PCT Gazette (No 01/1978) was published on May 11, 1978. The PCT Gazette was available both in paper and electronic form (at least during a period) before April 1, 2006. Since April 1, 2006, the Gazette is no longer made available in paper form.

== See also ==
- Official Journal of the European Patent Office
- European Patent Bulletin
- List of intellectual property law journals
