= Disclaimer (patent) =

Concept in patent law

In patent law, a disclaimer are words identifying, in a claim, subject-matter that is not claimed or another writing disclaiming rights ostensibly protected by the patent. By extension, a disclaimer may also mean the amendment consisting in introducing a negative limitation in an existing claim, i.e. "an amendment to a claim resulting in the incorporation therein of a 'negative' technical feature, typically excluding from a general feature specific embodiments or areas". The allowability of disclaimers is subject to particular conditions, which may vary widely from one jurisdiction to another.

== Origins ==
Possibly the earliest mention of patent disclaimers was in the British "Letters Patent and Trademark Amendment Act 1835", in the sense of a right to renounce one's patent monopoly or a part thereof. That right was subject to safeguards to make sure that the disclaimer was a true renunciation, rather than an extension of the monopoly. In 1865, in a case before the House of Lords, Ralston v. Smith (XI H.L.C. 223), the applicability of these safeguards were illustrated. Namely, an amendment by the patentee extended beyond the content of the patent application as filed, therefore extended the patent monopoly, and was not allowed by the House of Lords.

== Statutory disclaimer ==
In United States patent law, a statutory disclaimer is a statement in writing, recorded in the United States Patent and Trademark Office, disclaiming a complete claim of a patent or disclaiming a term, or terminal part of a term, of a patent granted or to be granted. If a claim in a patent is invalid, 35 U.S.C. § 288 requires that the invalid claim be disclaimed before costs may be recovered. A disclaimer disclaiming a terminal part of a term is called a terminal disclaimer and is often used to overcome a rejection for obviousness-type double patenting; however, a terminal disclaimer is ineffective against a rejection for same-invention double patenting under 35 U.S.C. § 101.

A statutory disclaimer may be filed as a paper document or through the Electronic Filing System as a document saved as PDF. A terminal disclaimer may also be filed as a purely Web-based eTerminal Disclaimer.

== See also ==
- Amendments under the European Patent Convention (EPC) (with a section dedicated to disclaimers under the EPC: Amendments under the European Patent Convention#Disclaimers)
- Prosecution disclaimer (United States patent law)
