= Case Law of the Boards of Appeal of the European Patent Office =

Book published by the European Patent Office

The Case Law of the Boards of Appeal of the European Patent Office is a book, published by the European Patent Office (EPO), which summarizes the body of case law on the European Patent Convention (EPC) developed by the Boards of Appeal of the EPO since the EPC entered into force at the end of the 1970s. Its tenth edition was published in 2022. The book is also known as the "White Book", and it was reported to be in 2012 the best-selling publication of the EPO. The White Book is published every three to four years. In the meantime, a special edition of the EPO Official Journal is issued each year summarizing the most recent case law of the boards of appeal.

Sir Robin Jacob, a former British judge specialized in intellectual property law, considered, in 2011, the book nothing short of "a very very good book (...) a super book", carrying on saying that "[in] fact, it is probably better than any other textbook". He admitted however that some decisions discussed in the White Book were pointing in different directions, but that this was because the case law itself was sometimes pointing in different directions.
