= Epoline =

European patent software

epoline
- Developer: European Patent Office
- Initial release: 2000s
- Operating system: Web-based (platform-independent)
- Type: Patent application and monitoring
- License: Proprietary
- Website: European Patent Office

epoline is a set of web-based computer programs and services enabling applicants, patentees and their representatives to file patent applications online before the European Patent Office (EPO), as well as to monitor the status of patent applications during their prosecution and patents during an opposition. The epoline products and services have been implemented and are maintained by the EPO, according to the Decision of the President of the EPO dated 29 October 2002.

== Products and services ==
Besides being available for filing European patent applications with the EPO, the epoline online filing software (also called "Online Filing", "OLF", "eOLF" or "epoline Online Filing") can also be used since December 3, 2003 for filing any official document during patent prosecution. The use of on-line filing passed the 50% level of patent application filings in January 2008. The epoline online filing software also allows to file patent applications online with the national patent offices that support it.

Until March 4, 2009, the epoline online filing software could not be used for filing oppositions or appeal. This had been confirmed by a Board of Appeal decision in T 514/05 of September 8, 2005, according to which "[a]n appeal filed via epoline [could not] have any legal effect absent explicit permission of the President of the EPO." The explicit permission of the President of the EPO has since been provided. Since March 5, 2009 indeed, documents in all proceedings under the EPC, including opposition, appeal, revocation, limitation and review proceedings, may be filed with the EPO in electronic form, i.e. with the epoline software or, subject to prior approval by the EPO, with other software. Priority documents however cannot be filed electronically, "unless they have been digitally signed by the issuing authority and the signature is accepted by the European Patent Office."

WebRegMT is a monitoring tool for monitoring data from the online European Patent Register. The tool sends e-mail alerts when a change occurs in the status of a selected patent application or patent.

== See also ==
- Electronic Filing System (USPTO)
- Deutsches Patent- und Markenamt (DPMA) filing software PaTrAS
