= Continuing patent application =

Type of patent application

Under United States patent law, a continuing patent application is a patent application that follows, and claims priority to, an earlier-filed patent application. A continuing patent application may be one of three types: a continuation, divisional, or continuation-in-part. Although continuation and continuation-in-part applications are generally available in the U.S. only, divisional patent applications are also available in other countries, as such availability is required under Article 4G of the Paris Convention.

== Early history ==
From 1838 to 1861, inventors could file patent applications on improvements to their inventions. These were published as "additional improvement patents" and were given numbers preceded by "A.I.". About 300 of these patents were issued.

== Current law ==
Under the law in the U.S., inventors may file several different types of patent applications to cover new improvements to their inventions or to cover different aspects of their inventions. These types of patent applications include "continuation", "divisional", "continuation in part", and "reissue".

=== Continuation ===
A "continuation application" is a patent application filed by an applicant who wants to pursue additional claims to an invention disclosed in an earlier application of the applicant (the "parent" application) that has not yet been issued or abandoned. The continuation uses the same specification as the pending parent application, claims the priority based on the filing date of the parent, and must name at least one of the inventors named in the parent application. This type of application is useful when a patent examiner allowed some, but rejected other claims in an application, or where an applicant may not have exhausted all useful ways of claiming different embodiments of the invention.

During the prosecution of a continuation application, the applicant may not add additional disclosure to the specification. If the inventor needs to supplement the disclosure of the earlier parent application, he has to file a continuation-in-part application.

=== Request for continued examination (RCE) ===
In the typical case, a patent examiner will examine patent claims and amendments in an original patent application for two rounds of "office actions" before ending examination. However, often two office actions are not enough to resolve all of the issues in the patent prosecution.

A request for continued examination (RCE) is a request by an applicant for continued prosecution after the patent office has issued a "final" rejection or after prosecution "on the merits" has been closed (for example by a Notice of Allowance or by a Final Rejection). An RCE is not considered a continuing patent application - rather, prosecution of the pending application is reopened. The inventor pays an additional filing fee and continues to argue his case with the patent examiner. No RCE was allowed prior to June 8, 1995.

==== QPIDS program ====
Because of a large number of last-minute Requests for Continuing Examination (RCEs) due to new prior art being found, and the additional burden these RCEs impose on examination, the USPTO launched in May 2012 the Quick Path Information Disclosure Statement (QPIDS) Pilot Program. The program can be used to submit an Information Disclosure Statement (IDS) during the time interval after payment of the issue fee but prior to patent grant. Only if the examiner feels that the references on the IDS are material, a Request for Continuous Examination is executed and examination is reopened. Prior to QPIDS program, launching a full-scale RCE was the only option to introduce new prior art during that time interval. Filing a QPIDS request requires a payment of full RCE and IDS fees, which are refunded, if no RCE is opened. However, QPIDS petition fee is not returned.

Ca. 2018 the QPIDS program became permanent, even though USPTO's own study in 2014 showed very low applicants' participation rate.

=== Divisional ===
A divisional application also claims priority based on the filing date of the parent application, but differs from a continuation application in that a divisional application claims a distinct or independent invention "carved out" of the parent application. A divisional application must share at least one of the inventors named in the parent application. A divisional application is often filed after the examiner issued a "restriction requirement", because a patent can only claim a single invention (cf. unity of invention). The USPTO practice of splitting patent applications into numerous divisionals has been criticized as an abuse intended to increase the USPTO revenues at the expense of patent holders.

=== Continuation-in-part (CIP) ===
A "continuation-in-part" application ("CIP" or "CIP application") is one in which the applicant adds subject matter not disclosed in the parent patent application, but repeats a substantial portion of the parent's specification, and shares at least one inventor with the parent application. The CIP application is a convenient way to claim enhancements developed after the parent application was filed. It is the successor to the earlier "additional improvement" patents mentioned above. For a continuation-in-part application, claims to subject matter that was also disclosed in the parent are entitled to the parent's priority date, while claims to the additional subject matter are only entitled to the filing date of the CIP application.

A patent of addition is available in Israel, which is generally similar to a CIP in the U.S.

=== Reissue ===
If an issued patent is found to be defective, the patent owner can surrender the patent and file a reissue application to correct the defect. One such defect occurs when the issued patent claims either more or less than the coverage to which the patentee is entitled, the latter situation resulting in a "broadening reissue". Thus, an inventor can submit a reissue application with broader claims and attempt to get the full coverage to which he or she is entitled. The inventor is not, however, allowed to add new features to the disclosure. A broadening reissue application must be filed within two years from the grant date of the originally issued patent. A reissue patent has the kind code E.

== Controversy around attempted changes by USPTO to continuation practice ==
In 2007, USPTO announced new regulations under 37 CFR (published August 21, 2007) that would significantly alter procedures regarding continuation applications before the USPTO. Previously, USPTO rules allowed an inventor to file as many continuations as necessary to get desired breadth of claims. The procedure was criticized for creating uncertainty as to what is covered or could be covered by a given patent application. An inventor, for example, could have sought to get claims with limited scope approved early, and then continue to file continuations over many years seeking broader coverage. For example, inventor Jerome H. Lemelson filed a series of continuations over thirty years to get a very broad patent on bar code readers. This patent was issued in 1984, long after bar code readers had become an integral part of the U.S. economy. Lemelson was then able to collect over a billion dollars in license fees from large companies using bar code readers. (Note however that the Lemelson optical recognition patents followed a since-replaced rule under which patents would expire 17 years after the patent was granted, regardless of when the patent application was filed. For patents filed on or after June 8, 1995, under the TRIPS agreement, continuation patents expire 20 years from the date of filing of the parent patent application, regardless of when the patent is granted. Thus, Lemelson's "submarine patents" strategy of taking steps that would delay the patent grant date will no longer extend the patent expiration date.)

To minimize this alleged abuse of the patent system, the USPTO proposed several changes to the rules as to the number of continuations an applicant can file. The proposed changes were announced on January 3, 2006, and were published in final form on August 21, 2007, after various modifications were made pursuant to input received as public notice and comment (during which the public was invited to comment on the proposed rule changes). Many of the provisions in the new rules went into effect November 1, 2007; however, certain additional exemptions apply for continuation applications filed before the publication date of August 21, 2007, even after November 1, 2007.

The proposed rules would have limited an inventor to filing two continuation applications for each type of invention disclosed in an original patent application, unless the applicant can show "good cause" for filing additional continuations. Furthermore, applicants could file only one RCE for each "family" of applications (that is, the group of applications including original applications and each of the continuation applications claiming the benefit of priority of the original application) unless the USPTO granted the applicant permission upon showing "good cause".

The proposed changes were generally opposed by patent agents and attorneys, manufacturing companies, biotechnology companies, and independent inventors. There was concern that the rule changes failed to consider the difficulties commonly encountered in getting a patent, and that the changes would result in inventors failing to get the full range of patent protection to which they are entitled. The groups also maintained that the rule changes were not consistent with the current regulations on continuations.

The rule changes were generally favored by software companies, electronics companies and US government agencies for the reasons given above. Those that favored the rule changes felt that said changes were consistent with the laws governing continuation practice.

On August 22, 2007, inventor Dr. Triantafyllos Tafas sued the USPTO in the United States District Court of the Eastern District of Virginia on the ground that the rule changes were in violation of the U.S. patent law and therefore are invalid. On October 9, 2007, pharmaceutical company GlaxoSmithKline filed a similar suit seeking a preliminary injunction to prevent the enforcement of the new rules. The court consolidated the two cases and scheduled a hearing on GlaxoSmithKline's motion for October 31, one day before the rules were to go into effect. On October 31, the court granted a preliminary injunction which prohibits the USPTO from enforcing the patent rules on continuations and claims which were to come into effect the following day. On April 1, 2008, the injunction was made permanent, but in March 2009, it was overturned by United States Court of Appeals for the Federal Circuit.

In October 2009, USPTO withdrew proposed changes to the continuation rules.

== See also ==
- Double patenting
- Priority right
- Provisional application
- Patent family
