= European Patent Bulletin =

The European Patent Bulletin is a weekly trilingual publication of the European Patent Office (EPO), generally issued every Wednesday. It contains "entries made in the Register of European Patents, as well as other particulars, the publication of which is prescribed by [the European Patent Convention (EPC)] or its implementation".

The European Patent Bulletin is published in German, English and French, the three official languages of the EPO. The three texts coexist in the same issue of the bulletin. The European Patent Bulletin has been published online since January 2004.

== Legal effect of mentions in the European Patent Bulletin ==
In the European patent grant procedure, the mention of the publication of the European search report in the European Patent Bulletin marks the start of the six-month period for filing the request for examination, paying the examination fee, paying the designation fees, and paying the extension fees.

At the end of the grant procedure, the decision to grant a European patent takes legal effect only from the day when the European Patent Bulletin mentions the grant. The publication of this mention in the European Patent Bulletin marks the start of the three-month period (or more in some countries, such as Ireland) for supplying the translation of the text in which the European patent has been granted to each national patent office, in order to have an effective protection in each country. The publication of this mention also marks the start of the nine-month period for giving notice of opposition to the patent to the EPO.

During the opposition procedure, when the European patent is maintained in an amended form, the publication of the mention of maintenance of the European patent in the European Patent Bulletin marks the start of the three-month period (or more in some countries, such as Ireland) for supplying the translation of the text in which the European patent has been maintained to each national patent office, in order to have an effective protection in each country.

== See also ==
- PCT Gazette
- List of intellectual property law journals
