= Claims under the European Patent Convention =

Article 84 of the European Patent Convention (EPC) specifies that the "matter" for which patent protection is sought, i.e. requested, in an application - the purported invention - shall be stated ("defined") in the claims. This legal provision also requires that the claims must be clear and concise, and supported by the description. The function, form and content of the claims are defined by Article 84 supplemented by Rule 43 EPC. (Note: Previously Rule 29 EPC 1973.)

The wording of Article 84 is as follows:

The claims shall define the matter for which protection is sought. They shall be clear and concise and be supported by the description.

== Rationale ==
The EPC requires that the claims be clear (for example the claim wording cannot be obscure) and define the matter for which protection is sought in terms of the technical features of the invention. The rationale behind this requirement is to ensure that the public is not left in any doubt as to which subject-matter is covered by a particular patent and which is not. That is, the scope of protection must be well-defined. The clarity requirement therefore plays an important role in providing legal certainty for third parties to determine whether they are infringing or could infringe a patent, so as in turn to be able to make the most informed economic decisions as possible (such as taking a license, designing around, refraining from entering a market, etc.).

== Clarity ==
According to the established case law of the EPO boards of appeal, the claims must be clear "in themselves when being read with the normal skills, but not including any knowledge derived from the description of the patent application ...". In other words, the wording of a claim must be clear in itself.

As mentioned above, a claim must define the matter for which the protection is sought in terms of the technical features of the invention. These technical features need not necessarily be structural however; they may also be functional. Structural features may for example consist in a nail, a screw or a rivet, whereas functional features define the suitability for performing certain functions, such as for example fastening means.

The scope of the claims must also not be "broader than is justified by the extent of the description and also the contribution to the art". "[T]his requirement reflects the general legal principle that the extent of the patent monopoly, as defined by the claims, should correspond to the technical contribution to the art in order for it to be supported, or justified."

== Implementing regulations ==
=== Rule 43(1) EPC ===
Rule 43(1) EPC notably imposes that an independent claim should be drafted in a two-part form, including a preamble and a characterizing part. The preamble, which is sometimes also called "pre-characterizing portion", includes all the features of the claim that in combination are known in a prior art document, namely the closest prior art. The characterizing part includes the other features, i.e., those not known in the prior art document used to draft the claim in a two-part form. The two-part form required by Rule 43(1) should be complied with "wherever appropriate". This manner of claiming an invention is also prescribed, in a similar manner, in the Patent Cooperation Treaty, namely in Rule 6.3(b) PCT.

=== Rule 43(2) EPC ===
A plurality of independent claims in the same claim category are only allowable in the exceptional circumstances listed in Rule 43(2)(a), (b) and (c). The applicant has the burden of showing "that one of the exceptions under Rule 43(2) EPC apply". Rule 43(2) is only applicable during examination proceedings, not in opposition proceedings.

Rule 62a EPC, which entered into force on April 1, 2010, provides the opportunity for the EPO to invite the applicant to comply with Rule 43(2) before the search is carried out. This was not foreseen under the former regulations. Under the new rules, if the claims as filed in a European patent application contain a plurality of independent claims in the same claim category and if the EPO considers in that case that the claims therefore do not comply with Rule 43(2) EPC, the EPO may "invite the applicant to indicate, within a period of two months, the claims complying with Rule 43, paragraph 2, on the basis of which the search is to be carried out." "If the applicant fails to provide such an indication in due time, the search shall be carried out on the basis of the first claim in each category". A Rule 62a EPC objection may however be contested by the applicant in its reply to the search division or, later, before the examining division. If the search division finds that its initial objection was not justified in view of the applicant's arguments, the search will then be carried out on an unlimited basis. The examining division may also override the assessment of the search division. Otherwise, the claims will have to be restricted, during examination, to the subject-matter searched.

This amendment to the Implementing Regulations of the EPC is part of the so-called "raising the bar" initiative, with the claimed aim "to improve the quality of incoming patent applications and streamline the grant procedure".

== Applicability of Article 84 EPC in opposition and revocation proceedings ==
Article 84 EPC is neither a ground of opposition under Article 100 EPC nor a ground for revocation under Article 138(1) EPC. Article 84 may however play a role in opposition proceedings, by virtue of Article 101(3) EPC, if the patent proprietor amends the claims. In 2015, the Enlarged Board of Appeal held in G 3/14 that "the clarity of the amended claims of a patent may be examined in opposition proceedings only when, and then only to the extent that the amendment introduces non-compliance with Article 84 EPC."

== Interpretation of the claims in opposition proceedings ==
In opposition proceedings, if the claims of the opposed patent are sufficiently clear for a skilled person to understand them without difficulty, then there is no reason to consult the description to interpret the claims. In other words, "the description can be used as the patent's "dictionary" to assess the correct meaning of ambiguous terms used in claims" but "if a term used in a claim has a clear technical meaning, the description cannot be used to interpret such a term in a different way." Furthermore, when the claims are interpreted, they "must be interpreted through the eyes of the person skilled in the art, who should try - with synthetical propensity - to arrive at an interpretation of the claim which is technically meaningful and takes into account the whole disclosure of the patent".
