= Petition to make special =

In United States patent law, a petition to make special (PTMS) is a formal request submitted to the United States Patent and Trademark Office (USPTO) asking that a patent application be examined ahead of the other pending applications in the same technological art.

== Background and rationale ==
Normally patent applications in a given technological art are examined in the order that they are filed in under the "first come, first served" principle. The patent office has realized, however, that some inventions deserve special attention and that patent applications covering these inventions should be examined as quickly as possible. If an invention falls into one of the special categories, the applicant (e.g. inventor) can petition to have it examined early.

A petition to make special can be granted because:

- one of the inventors is over the age of 65 or is ill to the point where they may not be available to assist in the prosecution of the patent,
- the head of a government agency requests that the application be made special,
- the patent relates to certain areas including: quality of the environment, development of energy resources, or terrorism,
- the applicant wishes to take part in accelerated examination as described below, or
- the applicant has received a positive indication of allowability in another jurisdiction and is participating in the Patent Prosecution Highway.

== Accelerated examination ==
Effective in August 2006, the USPTO introduced an accelerated patent examination procedure in an effort to allow inventors a speedy evaluation of an application with a final disposition within 12 months. The procedure requires additional information to be submitted with the application and also includes an interview with the examiner. The first accelerated patent was granted on March 15, 2007, with a 6-month issuance time.

== Petitions to make special and business methods ==
Petitions to make special are particularly important for timely examination of business method patents. Projected delays in examination of business method patents range from 4 to 14 years. This is primarily due to the step change in business method filings after the 1998 State Street Bank decision combined with the difficulty in hiring and training qualified patent examiners in the financial services arts (e.g. insurance and banking).

It is reported that a PTMS for Accelerated Examination can cut the time to get a patent to issue in the business method area from more than five years to less than two. First office actions can issue in as little as six months from the filing date of the application and notices of allowable subject matter have issued in just over a year.
