= Amendments under the European Patent Convention =

Amendments to a European patent application or patent

Article 123 of the European Patent Convention (EPC) relates to the amendments under the EPC, i.e. the amendments to a European patent application or patent, and notably the conditions under which they are allowable. In particular, Article 123(2) EPC prohibits adding subject-matter going beyond the content of the application as filed, while Article 123(3) EPC prohibits an extension of the scope of protection by amendment after grant. In addition, Rule 80 EPC limits the types of amendments that can be done during opposition proceedings before the European Patent Office (EPO), and Rule 139 EPC relates to the correction of errors in documents filed with the EPO.

== Background ==
The EPC provides that an applicant may in principle amend the documents constituting their European patent application after filing, as it is considered that the applicant may not have a full picture of the prior art at the time when the application is drafted and filed with the EPO.

== Article 123(1) EPC: Procedural framework for amendments ==
Article 123(1) EPC provides the right for an applicant, in proceedings before the European Patent Office (EPO), to amend its European patent application and for a patent proprietor (during opposition proceedings) the right to amend its European patent. This must however be done in accordance with the Implementing Regulations, considering that the applicant is given "at least one opportunity to amend the application of his own volition." According to the Implementing Regulations, amendments before receiving the (extended) European search report are generally not allowed. Amendments are allowed in response to the extended European search report (i.e., in response to the communication under Rule 70a(1) or (2) EPC) and amendments are also allowed shortly after entry into European phase of a PCT application (namely, in response to the communication under Rule 161(1) EPC). Then, any further amendment is subject to the consent of the Examining Division.

== Article 123(2) EPC: General substantive requirements for amendments ==
=== Overview ===
Article 123(2) EPC provides that a European patent application, or European patent, may not be amended (both before and after grant) in such a way that it contains subject-matter which extends beyond the content of the application as filed. In other words, an amendment cannot go beyond the original disclosure of the application. The amended subject-matter must be directly and unambiguously derivable (i.e., clearly and unambiguously derivable), for a skilled person, "using common general knowledge, and seen objectively and relative to the date of filing," from the content of the application as filed. "After the amendment the skilled person may not be presented with new technical information." This test is often referred to as the "gold standard" for assessing compliance with Article 123(2) EPC at the EPO. "The underlying idea of Art. 123(2) EPC is that an applicant should not be allowed to improve his position by adding subject-matter not disclosed in the application as filed, which would give him an unwarranted advantage and could be damaging to the legal security of third parties relying on the content of the original application (...)." This legal provision illustrates the importance accorded by the Convention to the content of a European patent application as filed –i.e. on the filing date– in respect of its legal effects.

Article 123(2) EPC does not concern whether amendments have introduced an expression not present in the application as filed, but whether the amendments have introduced subject-matter extending beyond the content of the application as filed. In other words, the only relevant question is whether the skilled person is confronted, in the amended version of the application or the patent, with additional technical information compared to the technical information contained in the application as filed. If so, Article 123(2) EPC is violated.

An extension of the subject-matter of the European patent beyond the content of the application as filed is a ground of opposition, and revocation.

=== Standard of proof ===
When assessing the content of a European patent application as filed, the applicable standard of proof is a rigorous standard, namely the certainty "beyond reasonable doubt" rather than the "balance of probabilities", the normal standard of proof in civil proceedings.

=== Specific types of amendments ===
==== Disclaimers ====
A disclaimer defines, in a claim, subject-matter which is not claimed. By extension, a disclaimer may also mean the action of introduction a negative limitation in a claim, i.e. "an amendment to a claim resulting in the incorporation therein of a "negative" technical feature, typically excluding from a general feature specific embodiments or areas". The allowability of disclaimers is subject to particular conditions.

Under the case law of the Boards of Appeal of the EPO, disclaimers are allowed only in certain circumstances, as confirmed in G 1/03 and G 2/03 decisions:

"A disclaimer [which is not disclosed in the application as filed] may be allowable in order to:

- restore novelty by delimiting a claim against state of the art under Article 54(3) and (4) EPC;
- restore novelty by delimiting a claim against an accidental anticipation under Article 54(2) EPC; an anticipation is accidental if it is so unrelated to and remote from the claimed invention that the person skilled in the art would never have taken it into consideration when making the invention; and
- disclaim subject-matter which, under Articles 52 to 57 EPC, is excluded from patentability for non-technical reasons."

In decision G 2/10, the Enlarged Board of Appeal further decided that:

"1a. An amendment to a claim by the introduction of a disclaimer disclaiming from it subject-matter disclosed in the application as filed infringes Article 123(2) EPC if the subject-matter remaining in the claim after the introduction of the disclaimer is not, be it explicitly or implicitly, directly and unambiguously disclosed to the skilled person using common general knowledge, in the application as filed.

1b. Determining whether or not that is the case requires a technical assessment of the overall technical circumstances of the individual case under consideration, taking into account the nature and extent of the disclosure in the application as filed, the nature and extent of the disclaimed subject-matter and its relationship with the subject-matter remaining in the claim after the amendment."

Therefore, in G 2/10, the Enlarged Board of Appeal has essentially restored the possibility for an applicant or patentee to renounce part of its patent monopoly, subject to certain conditions.

== Article 123(3) EPC: Additional substantive requirements for post-grant amendments ==
Article 123(3) EPC prohibits, after grant, amendments extending the protection conferred by a European patent. It is for instance "not allowable to replace a technical feature of a granted claim with another technical feature which causes the claim to extend to subject-matter which was not encompassed by the granted claim." "Article 123(3) EPC is directly aimed at protecting the interests of third parties by prohibiting any broadening of the claims of a granted patent, even if there should be a basis for such broadening in the application as filed." While, before grant, the legal security of third parties has been considered to be "sufficiently protected by the prohibition of extending the content of the application by amendment beyond what was originally disclosed", without therefore prohibiting a broadening of the claims before grant, the situation is different after grant. After grant, "the interests of third parties are further protected by Article 123(3) EPC [in that] the patentee's right to amend the claims is limited by the scope of the granted patent."

According to Enlarged Board of Appeal decision G 2/88, "it is the totality of the claims before amendment in comparison with the totality of the claims after the proposed amendment that has to be considered". If for instance the subject-matter of the claims is changed during opposition proceedings to a different embodiment and if, thereby, the scope of protection of the claims has been extended, the amendment, or change, is contrary to Article 123(3) EPC.

=== Inescapable Article 123(2) and (3) EPC trap ===
According to the case law of the Boards of Appeal, if a European patent contains a feature that was not disclosed in the application as filed (in contravention of Article 123(2) EPC) and if the removal of this feature would extend the scope of protection beyond the scope conferred by the patent as granted (in contravention of Article 123(3) EPC), the European patent has, in principle, to be revoked. In principle again, it does not matter whether the amendment leading to such a situation may have been approved during prosecution by the Examining Division, since the responsibility for any amendment always lies with the applicant.

The German Federal Court of Justice (BGH) has adopted a different solution to this problem, allowing patentees to avoid the trap altogether: the so-called "footnote solution". The limiting feature, which was not originally disclosed in the application as filed, can stay in the claim and will limit the scope of protection, but is ignored for assessing patentability.

== Additional formal restriction on amendments during opposition proceedings ==
During opposition proceedings, the patent proprietor may only amend the description, claims and drawings of the European patent if "the amendments are occasioned by a ground for opposition under Article 100, even if that ground has not been invoked by the opponent".

== Correction of errors (Rule 139 EPC) ==
Rule 139 EPC relates to a specific form of amendments, namely corrections of errors in documents filed with the EPO. Rule 139 EPC contains two sentences, the first one providing for that, in general, "[l]inguistic errors, errors of transcription and mistakes in any document filed with the European Patent Office may be corrected on request", and the second stating that when the requested correction relates to the parts of a patent application or patent relating to the disclosure of the invention, i.e. the description, claims or drawings, "the correction must be obvious in the sense that it is immediately evident that nothing else would have been intended than what is offered as the correction."

== See also ==
- G 1/03 and G 2/03 (relating to undisclosed disclaimers)
- G 1/05 and G 1/06 (relating to divisional patent applications)
- G 1/10 (relating to requests for corrections of a granted European patent under Rule 140 EPC)
- G 2/10 (relating to disclosed disclaimers)
- Intermediate generalisation

== Further resources ==
- Robert Young (8–9 November 2012). EPO boards of appeal and key decisions: Disclaimers and their legal basis, especially in the light of decisions G 1/03, 2/03 and G 2/10 – possible consequences for their use as an instrument of patent prosecution. Munich, Germany: European Patent Office.
