= Novelty under the European Patent Convention =

Under the European Patent Convention (EPC), European patents shall be granted for inventions which inter alia are new. The central legal provision explaining what this means, i.e. the central legal provision relating to the novelty under the EPC, is Article 54 EPC. Namely, "an invention can be patented only if it is new. An invention is considered to be new if it does not form part of the state of the art. The purpose of Article 54(1) EPC is to prevent the state of the art being patented again."

== Definition of the "state of the art" ==
Since an invention is considered to be new if it does not form part of the state of the art, the legal concept of "state of the art" is critical for assessing whether an invention is new.

=== State of the art under Article 54(2) EPC ===
The state of the art is essentially defined in Article 54(2) EPC. Namely:

The state of the art shall be held to comprise everything made available to the public by means of a written or oral description, by use, or in any other way, before the date of filing of the European patent application.

The state of the art under the EPC is therefore said to be absolute. Even the disclosure to a single person who is under no obligation to maintain secrecy is sufficient for a disclosure to be considered part of the state of the art. The absolute novelty also means that even the theoretical possibility of having unrestricted access to a certain information is regarded as rendering this information available to the public. In other words, as summarized in decision T 1081/01:

The case law (...) accepts that information is "available to the public" if only a single member of the public is in a position to gain access to it and understand it, and if there is no obligation to maintain secrecy.

The subject-matter in a disclosure can, however, "only be regarded as having been made available to the public, and therefore as comprised in the state of the art (...), if the information given is sufficient to enable the skilled person, at the relevant date (...) and taking into account the common general knowledge in the field at that time, to practise the technical teaching which is the subject of the disclosure (...). In other words, the subject-matter in a disclosure can only destroy novelty "if the teaching it contains is reproducible".

=== State of the art under Article 54(3) EPC ===
Furthermore, Article 54(3) EPC extends the content of the state of the art by also including "the content of European patent applications as filed, the dates of filing of which are prior to the date referred to in paragraph 2 and which were published on or after that date". The purpose of this notional extension of the state of the art under the European Patent Convention is to address conflicting prior rights which might otherwise, without Article 54(3) EPC, lead to more than one patent granted for the same invention to different inventors. The extension of the definition of the state of the art under Article 54(3) EPC is limited to the assessment of novelty and does not apply to the assessment of inventive step. In other words, "documents within the meaning of Article 54(3) EPC are not to be considered in deciding on inventive step".

=== Non-prejudicial disclosures (Article 55 EPC) ===
Article 55 EPC provides for two specific situations in which a disclosure before the filing of a European patent application might not be regarded as part of the state of the art under Article 54 EPC. The first situation is the case of an evident abuse "in relation to the applicant or his legal predecessor", and the second is the disclosure of an invention "at an official, or officially recognised, international exhibition falling within the terms of the Convention on international exhibitions signed at Paris on 22 November 1928 and last revised on 30 November 1972."

== Novelty assessment ==
=== Explicit or implicit disclosure ===
When it comes to assessing novelty, the disclosure of a prior art document is regarded as encompassing not only its explicit disclosure but also "everything that the skilled person would inherently understand when reading the document", i.e. its implicit disclosure. "The implicit disclosure [of a piece of prior art] means no more than the clear and unambiguous consequence of what is explicitly mentioned" in the piece of prior art.

=== Specific disclosure taking away the novelty of a generic feature ===
When assessing novelty, a generic disclosure (in the state of the art, i.e. for instance in a prior art document) does not normally take away the novelty of any specific example falling within that disclosure. On the other hand, "a specific disclosure does take away the novelty of a generic claim embracing that disclosure". For instance, the prior disclosure of the subset "vegetables" takes away the novelty of the wider set "fruits and plants". Or, as two other examples,

"a disclosure of copper takes away the novelty of metal as a generic concept, but not the novelty of any metal other than copper, and one of rivets takes away the novelty of fastening means as a generic concept, but not the novelty of any fastening other than rivets."

More generally, any disclosure in the prior art of something falling within the ambit of a claim deprives the claim of novelty.

== Legal fiction of Article 54(4) and (5) EPC; special concept of novelty ==
Besides the general principle that something cannot be patented if it was already known in the state of the art (because not new), there are cases wherein a substance or composition may be notionally considered new (i.e. by virtue of a legal fiction) even when the substance or composition is as such already comprised in the state of the art. Namely, Article 54(4) and (5) EPC "acknowledges the notional novelty of substances or compositions even when they are as such already comprised in the state of the art, provided they are claimed for a new use in a method which Article 53(c) EPC excludes as such from patent protection." Article 53(c) EPC excludes from patentability methods for treatment of the human or animal body by surgery or therapy and diagnostic methods practised on the human or animal body, but this provision does not apply to products, in particular substances or compositions, for use in any of these methods. Article 54(4) and (5) EPC is complementary to Article 53(c) EPC.

Furthermore, according to the case law of the Boards of Appeal, "the first to show a use of a substance or composition in a medical method should receive broad protection covering any use in a medical method, even if only one specific use is disclosed in the application (see T 128/82, OJ 1984, 164; T 36/83 OJ 1986, 295)".

== See also ==
- Internet disclosures (EPO case law)
