= Divisional patent application =

A divisional patent application, also called divisional application or simply divisional, is a type of patent application that contains subject-matter from a previously filed application, the previously filed application being its parent application. While a divisional application is filed later than the parent application, it retains its parent's filing date, and will generally claim the same priority. Divisional applications are generally used in cases where the parent application may lack unity of invention; that is, the parent application describes more than one invention and the applicant is required to split the parent into one or more divisional applications each claiming only a single invention. The ability to file divisional applications in cases of lack of unity of invention is required by Article 4G of the Paris Convention.

== Practice by jurisdiction ==
The practice and procedure of filing a divisional patent application vary from jurisdiction to jurisdiction. In most countries, the filing of divisional applications is possible at least as long as the parent patent applications are pending. Since 2013, the European Patent Office rules are again in line with the current practice before the patent offices in the U.S., Germany, and Japan.

=== European Patent Convention ===
Before the European Patent Office (EPO), divisional applications can be filed under Article 76 EPC. A European divisional application is a new application which is separate and independent from the parent application unless specific provisions in the European Patent Convention (EPC) require something different.

"The procedure concerning the divisional application is in principle independent from the procedure concerning the parent application and the divisional application is treated as a new application... Although there are some connections between the two procedures (e.g. concerning time limits), actions (or omissions) occurring in the procedure concerning the parent application after the filing of the divisional application should not influence the procedure concerning the latter...."

The practice relating to the filing of divisional applications under the EPC was clarified by the Enlarged Board of Appeal of the EPO in June 2007. The Board held that a divisional application which on filing contained subject-matter extending beyond the content of the earlier application as filed could be amended later to remove the deficiency, even at a time when the earlier application is no longer pending.

=== United States ===
In the United States, a divisional application is defined as a specific type of continuing patent application. A later application for an independent or distinct invention, carved out of an earlier-filed patent application and disclosing and claiming only subject matter disclosed in the earlier or parent application, is known as a divisional application. In many non-U.S. jurisdictions, however, the term “divisional” is often used more broadly to refer to continuing applications in general, encompassing concepts that may differ from the U.S. definition.

A divisional application is often filed as a result of a restriction requirement made by an examiner. A restriction requirement may be issued if two or more independent and distinct inventions are claimed in a single application. In such cases, the examiner may require the application to be restricted to one of the independent inventions. Thus, a restriction requirement may require an applicant to divide a single patent application into multiple separate applications. U.S. law provides protection for divisional applications against double patenting rejections and invalidation of the resulting patents based on double patenting grounds.

== Cascade of divisionals ==
If a divisional application is filed based on a patent application that is already a divisional application, the newly filed divisional is a second-generation divisional, and so on, "thereby creating a cascade of divisionals".

== See also ==
- Submarine patent
