= List of treaties =

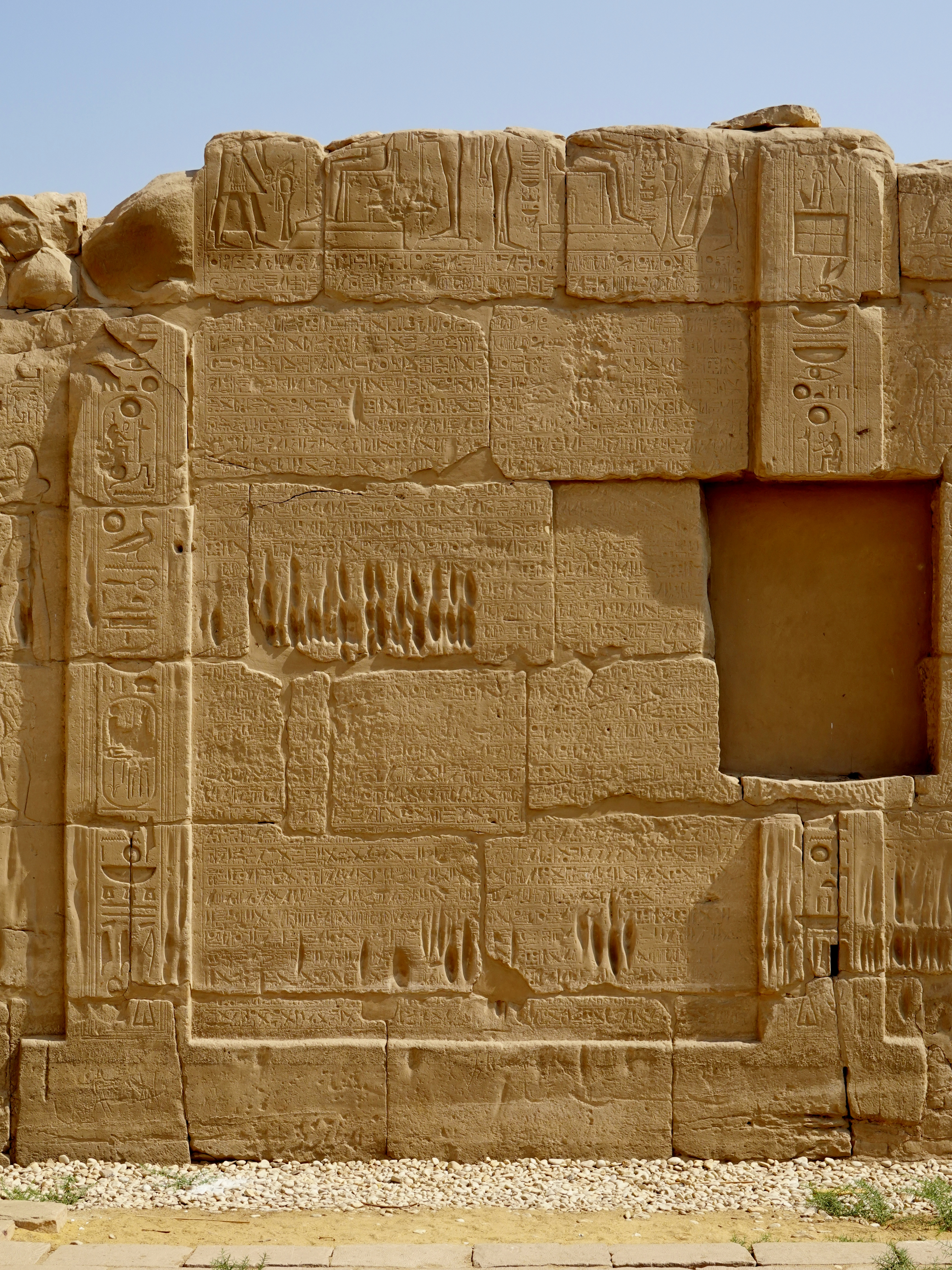
The oldest known surviving peace treaty in the world, the Egyptian–Hittite peace treaty preserved at the Temple of Amun in Karnak

This list of treaties contains known agreements, pacts, peaces, and major contracts between states, armies, governments, and tribal groups.

== Before 1200 CE ==
Year	Name	Summary
c. 3100 BCE	(Lagash and Umma of Mesopotamia)	Border agreement between the Eannatum of Lagash and Umma in Mesopotamia, inscribed on a stone block, setting a prescribed boundary between their two states.
c. 1310 BCE	Aleppo Treaty	Treaty between Hittite monarch Muršili II and his nephew, King Talmi-Šarruma of Aleppo. Preserved in copies made by Muršili's son, Muwatalli II.
c. 1259 BCE	Egyptian–Hittite peace treaty	Treaty between the Egyptian pharaoh Ramses II and the Hittite monarch Hattusili III after the Battle of Kadesh.
c. 493 BCE	Foedus Cassianum (Note: Also known as the Treaty of Cassius.)	Ends the war between the Roman Republic and the Latin League, creates an alliance between the two.
c. 449 BCE	Peace of Callias	Purported treaty that ended the Greco-Persian Wars.
445 BCE	Thirty Years Peace	Ends the First Peloponnesian War between Athens and Sparta.
421 BCE	Peace of Nicias (Note: Also known as the Fifty-Years Peace)	Athens and Sparta end the first phase of the Peloponnesian War.
387 BCE	Peace of Antalcidas	Sets the boundaries of Greek and Persian territory. Ended the Corinthian War.
241 BCE	Treaty of Lutatius	Ends the First Punic War.
226 BCE	Ebro Treaty	Establishes the Ebro River in Iberia as the boundary line between the Roman Republic and Carthage.
215 BCE	Macedonian–Carthaginian Treaty	Establishes an anti-Roman alliance between Philip V of Macedon and Hannibal of Carthage.
205 BCE	Treaty of Phoenice	Ends the First Macedonian War.
196 BCE	Treaty of Tempe	Ends the Second Macedonian War.
188 BCE	Treaty of Apamea	Between the Roman Republic and Antiochus III (the Great), ruler of the Seleucid Empire.
161 BCE	Roman–Jewish Treaty	Establishes friendship between Judas Maccabeus and the Roman Republic.
85 BCE	Treaty of Dardanos	Ends the First Mithridatic War.
387	Peace of Acilisene	Between the Eastern Roman (Byzantine) Empire and the Sassanian Persian Empire. Divided Kingdom of Armenia between the two.
532	The Eternal Peace	Between the Eastern Roman (Byzantine) Empire and the Sassanian Persian Empire.
562	The Fifty-Year Peace	Between the Eastern Roman (Byzantine) Empire and the Sassanian Persian Empire. Ended a 20-year war over the Kingdom of Lazica.
587	Treaty of Andelot (Note: Also known as the Pact of Andelot.)	Between Frankish rulers Guntram and Brunhilda; Guntram adopts Brunhilda's son Childebert II.
628	Treaty of Hudaybiyyah	Between Muslims and the Quraish.
641	The Bakt	Between Nubia and Egypt.
713	Treaty of Orihuela (Note: Also known as the Treaty of Tudmir.)	Establishes a dhimmi over the Christian inhabitants of Orihuela.
716	Byzantine–Bulgarian Treaty of 716	Officially ends the Battle of Anchialus and establishes the borders between Byzantium and the Bulgarian Empire.
783	Peace treaty between China and Tibet (783)	Peace treaty between Tang China and the Tibetan Empire.
803	Pax Nicephori	Peace between Charlemagne and the Byzantine Empire; recognizes Venice as Byzantine territory.
811	Treaty of Heiligen	Peace between the Danes (under their new king, Hemming of Denmark) and the Franks (under Charlemagne).
815	Byzantine–Bulgarian Treaty of 815	Ends prolonged series of conflicts between the Bulgarian Empire and the Byzantine Empire in Bulgarian favour.
822	Peace treaty between China and Tibet (822)	Ends a conflict between Tang China and the Tibetan Empire.
836	Pactum Sicardi	Peace between the Duchy of Naples and the Principality of Salerno under Sicard.
843	Treaty of Verdun	Partitions the Carolingian Empire.
870	Treaty of Mersen	Further partitions the Carolingian Empire.
878–890	Treaty of Alfred and Guthrum	Between Alfred of Wessex and Guthrum, the Viking ruler of East Anglia.
907	Rus'–Byzantine Treaty (907)	Regulates the status of the colony of Rus' merchants in Constantinople.
911	Rus'–Byzantine Treaty (911)	Between the Byzantine Empire and Kievan Rus'.
911	Treaty of Saint-Clair-sur-Epte	Charles the Simple grants Normandy to Rollo.
921	Treaty of Bonn	West Francia and East Francia both recognize each other.
945	Rus'–Byzantine Treaty (945)	Between the Byzantine Empire and Kievan Rus'.
1004	Chanyuan Treaty	Establishes relations between the Northern Song and Liao dynasties.
1018	Peace of Bautzen	Between Holy Roman Emperor Henry II and Duke Bolesław I the Brave of Poland.
1033	Peace of Merseburg	Between Holy Roman Emperor Conrad II and Duke Mieszko II of Poland.
1059	Treaty of Melfi	Pope Nicholas II recognizes Norman influence in southern Italy.
1080	Treaty of Ceprano	Pope Gregory VII establishes an alliance with Robert Guiscard and recognizes his conquests.
1082	Byzantine–Venetian Treaty of 1082	Byzantium grants trade concessions to Venice in return for military aid against the Normans.
1091	Treaty of Caen	Ends rivalry between William II of England and Duke Robert Curthose of Normandy.
1101	Treaty of Alton	Robert Curthose recognizes Henry I as King of England.
1108	Treaty of Devol	The Principality of Antioch becomes a nominal vassal of the Byzantine Empire.
1122	Pactum Calixtinum	Between Pope Callixtus II and Holy Roman Emperor Henry V, Holy Roman Emperor.
1123	Pactum Warmundi	The crusader Kingdom of Jerusalem allies with Venice.
1139	Treaty of Mignano	Roger II of Sicily recognised as king by the legitimate Pope Innocent II.
1141	Treaty of Shaoxing	Ends conflicts between the Jin dynasty and Southern Song dynasty.
1143	Treaty of Zamora	Recognises Portuguese independence from the Kingdom of León.
1151	Treaty of Tudilén (Note: Also known as the Treaty of Tudején.)	Recognises the conquests of the Crown of Aragon south of the Júcar and recognises future conquests in Murcia.
1153	Treaty of Wallingford (Note: Also known as the Treaty of Winchester or the Treaty of Westminster.)	Officially ends The Anarchy between Empress Matilda and her cousin Stephen of England.
1153	Treaty of Constance (Note: Also known as the First Treaty of Constance.)	Frederick I, Holy Roman Emperor, and Pope Eugene III agree to defend Italy against Manuel I Comnenus.
1156	Treaty of Benevento	Peace between the Papacy and the Kingdom of Sicily.
1158	Treaty of Sahagún (1158)	Between Sancho III of Castile and Ferdinand II of León.
1170	Treaty of Sahagún (1170)	Between Alfonso VIII of Castile and Alfonso II of Aragon.
1175	Treaty of Windsor (1175)	Between King Henry II of England and the last High King of Ireland, Rory O'Connor during Norman expansion in Ireland.
1177	Treaty of Venice (Note: Also known as the Peace of Venice.)	Peace between the Papacy, the Lombard League, the Kingdom of Sicily, and the Holy Roman Emperor, Frederick Barbarossa.
1179	Treaty of Cazorla (Note: Also known as the Treaty of Cazola.)	Defines the zones of conquest in Andalusia between Aragon and Castile.
1183	Peace of Constance (Note: Also known as the Second Treaty of Constance.)	Peace between the Lombard League and the Holy Roman Emperor, Frederick Barbarossa. Reaffirms the Peace of Venice.
1192	Treaty of Jaffa	Ends the Third Crusade.

== 1200–1299 ==
Year	Name	Summary
1200	Treaty of Le Goulet	John of England and Philip II of France make peace. Marriage between Blanche of Castile and Louis VIII of France.
1204	Partitio terrarum imperii Romaniae	Agreement between the participants of the Fourth Crusade on the division of the Byzantine Empire. Establishment of the Latin Empire.
1209	Treaty of Speyer	Otto IV renounces the Concordat of Worms.
1212	Golden Bull of Sicily	Determines the rights and duties of the Bohemian monarchs.
1214	Treaty of Nymphaeum	Establishes peace between the Nicaean Empire and the Latin Empire.
1214	Treaty of Chinon	Between King John of England and Philip II of France.
1215	Magna Carta	Between King John of England and his subjects.
1217	Treaty of Lambeth	Between Louis VIII of France and Henry III of England.
1218	Golden Charter of Bern	Establishes Bern as an independent state.
1219	Nicaean–Venetian Treaty of 1219	Grants Venetians freedom of trade and duty-free imports throughout the Nicaean Empire in exchange for non-support for the Latin Empire.
1220	Treaty with the Princes of the Church (Note: Also known as the Confoederatio cum principibus ecclesiasticis.)	Between Holy Roman Emperor Frederick II and German bishops.
1222	Golden Bull of 1222	Andrew II of Hungary grants Hungarian nobles the power to disobey the king when he acted contrary to the law.
1226	Treaty of Melun	Forces the counts of Flanders to swear fealty to the French crown.
1226	Golden Bull of Rimini	Resolves disputes over Chełmno Land.
1229	Treaty of Paris (1229)	Officially ends the Albigensian Crusade.
1230	Treaty of San Germano	Holy Roman Emperor Frederick II restores Sicily to Pope Gregory IX.
1230	Treaty of Ceprano (1230)	Establishes lines of reconciliation between Pope Gregory IX and Holy Roman Emperor Frederick II.
1230	Treaty of Kruszwica	Konrad I of Masovia grants Chełmno Land to the Prussians and the Order of Dobrzyń.
1234	Golden Bull of Rieti	Recognizes Kulmerland (Chełmno Land) as subject to the Pope's authority and not as a fief belonging to anyone.
1236	Treaty of Kremmen	The Margraviate of Brandenburg gains most of the territory and the right of succession for Pomerania-Demmin.
1236	Treaty of Stensby	Between King Valdemar II of Denmark and the Teutonic Order. Transferred northern maritime Estonia to the Kingdom of Denmark in exchange for military support.
1237	Treaty of York	A feudal agreement between Henry III of England and Alexander III of Scotland.
1244	Treaty of Almizra (Note: Also known as the Treaty of Almiçra.)	Establishes the borders of the Kingdom of Valencia.
1244	Treaty of Xàtiva	Permits the Moors of Spain to hold on to the Xativa Castle for two years before relinquishing it to King James I of Aragon.
1245	Al-Azraq Treaty	Between the King James I of Aragon and the Muslim commander Mohammad Abu Abdallah Ben Hudzail al Sahuir.
1249	Treaty of Christburg	Establishes peace between the pagan Prussian clans and the Teutonic Knights.
1249	Treaty of Lödöse	Prevents mutual hostility between the Kingdom of Sweden and the Kingdom of Norway from escalating into war.
1250	Treaty of Landin	Succession of Pomerania-Demmin: The Margraviate of Brandenburg's rights are dropped in favour of Pomerania-Stettin.
1258	Treaty of Corbeil	Establishes a border between France and the Crown of Aragon.
1258	Provisions of Oxford	Between King Henry III, of England and his Barons. Established a permanent baronial council and parliaments.
1259	Treaty of Paris (Note: Also known as the Treaty of Albeville.)	Between Louis IX of France and Henry III of England.
1261	Treaty of Nymphaeum	A trade and defense pact between the Nicaean Empire and the Republic of Genoa.
1262	Old Covenant	Between the major chieftains of Iceland and Haakon IV of Norway. The signing brought about the union of Iceland with Norway.
1265	Treaty of Pipton	Established alliance between Prince Llywelyn ap Gruffudd of Wales and Simon de Montford during the Second Barons' War.
1266	Dictum of Kenilworth	Ends hostilities between the supporters of Simon de Montfort, 6th Earl of Leicester and Henry III of England; comes into effect in 1267.
1266	Treaty of Perth	Terms of sovereignty over the Western Isles, the Isle of Man, and the Northern Isles agreed between Norway and Scotland.
1267	Treaty of Badajoz	King Alfonso X and King Afonso III agree to use the Guadiana River as the boundary line separating Castile and Portugal.
1267	Treaty of Montgomery	Henry III of England acknowledges Llywelyn ap Gruffudd's title as the 'Prince of Wales'.
1267	Treaty of Viterbo	Grants Charles I of Anjou claims to the defunct Latin Empire.
1271	Peace of Pressburg (Note: Also known as the Peace of Bratislava.)	Ends war between Bohemia and Hungary.
1277	Treaty of Aberconwy	Between King Edward I of England and Llewelyn the Last of Wales.
1278	Paréage of Andorra 1278	Between the Count of Foix, Roger-Bernard III, and the Bishop of Urgell, Pere d'Urtx, establishing their joint-sovereignty over the territory of Andorra.
1281	Treaty of Orvieto	Between Charles I of Sicily, the Republic of Venice, and Philip of Courtenay; attempts to recover the Latin Empire.
1283	Treaty of Rheinfelden	Duke Rudolph II of Austria surrenders power to his older brother Albert I of Germany.
1283	Rostock Peace Treaty	Between 8 Hanseatic towns in the Baltic region, the dukes of Saxony and Pomerania, the prince of Rügen, the lords of Schwerin and Dannenberg and the nobility of Rostock.
1289–1290	Treaty of Birgham	Attempts to end competing claims between the House of Balliol and the House of Bruce for the Scottish throne; never comes into effect.
1291	Treaty of Tarascon	Ends the Aragonese Crusade.
1295	Auld Alliance	Scotland and France forge the first treaty of mutual self-defense against England.
1295	Treaty of Anagni	Reaffirms the Treaty of Tarascon, but fails to diplomatically settle the Sicilian question.

== 1300–1399 ==
Year	Name	Summary
1302	Peace of Caltabellotta	Ends the War of the Sicilian Vespers.
1303	Treaty of Paris (1303)	Restores Gascony to England from France during the Hundred Years' War.
1304	Treaty of Torrellas (Note: Also known as a sentencia arbitral, "sentence by arbitration.")	Brought peace to Castile and Aragon and divided up the Kingdom of Murcia between them.
1305	Treaty of Athis-sur-Orge	France acquires the cities of Lille, Douai, and Béthune and Flanders retains its independence.
1305	Treaty of Elche	Modifies the Treaty of Torrellas and grants Cartagena to Castile.
1309	Treaty of Soldin (1309)	The Teutonic Order purchases from Margrave Waldemar of Brandenburg-Stendal the rights to Pomerelia and Danzig (Gdańsk).
1317	Treaty of Templin	Ascanians surrender the territories of Schlawe-Stolp to the Pomeranians.
1323	Treaty of Nöteborg (Note: Also known as the Treaty of Oreshek)	Sets the boundary between Sweden and Novgorod Republic.
1323	Treaty of Paris	Count Louis of Flanders relinquishes Flemish claims over Zeeland.
1326	Treaty of Corbeil	Renews the Auld Alliance between France and Scotland.
1326	Treaty of Novgorod	End decades of border skirmishes at the border of Norway and Novgorod Republic.
1328	Treaty of Edinburgh–Northampton	Between Edward III of England and the Scots.
1329	Treaty of Pavia (1329)	Between Louis IV, Holy Roman Emperor and his nephews.
1338	Declaration of Rhense (Note: Also known as the Treaty of Rhense.)	German princes elect German kings without the consent of the Papacy.
1340	Truce of Espléchin	Between the English and French crowns during the Hundred Years' War.
1343	Treaty of Kalisz (1343)	Between King Casimir III the Great of Poland and the Teutonic Knights.
1348	Treaty of Namslau	Between King Charles IV of Bohemia and King Casimir III of Poland.
1354	Treaty of Stralsund (1354)	Settles border disputes between the duchies of Mecklenburg and Pomerania.
1354	Treaty of Mantes	First peace between Charles II of Navarre and John II of France.
1355	Treaty of Valognes	Second peace between Charles II of Navarre and John II of France.
1355	Treaty of Paris (1355)	Recognizes the annexation of the Barony of Gex by the county of Savoy.
1358	Treaty of Zadar	The Republic of Venice loses influence over territories in Dalmatia.
1359	Treaty of London (1359) (Note: Also known as the Second Treaty of London.)	Cedes western France to England; repudiated by the Estates-General in Paris.
1360	Treaty of Brétigny	Ends the first phase of the Hundred Years' War.
1370	Treaty of Stralsund (1370)	Ends the war between the Hanseatic League and Denmark.
1371	Treaty of Vincennes-Edinburgh	Renewal of the Auld Alliance between the Kingdoms of France and Scotland.
1373	Anglo-Portuguese Treaty of 1373	Treaty of alliance between King Edward III of England and King Ferdinand I and Queen Eleanor of Portugal; it is the oldest treaty still in force.
1379	Treaty of Neuberg	Divides Habsburg lands between Dukes Albert III and Leopold III.
1380	Treaty of Dovydiškės	Jogaila signs a secret peace treaty with the Teutonic Knights against Kęstutis.
1382	Treaty of Dubysa (Note: Also known as the Treaty of Dubissa.)	Jogaila promises to convert the Grand Duchy of Lithuania to Christianity, cede Samogitia, and establish a four-year alliance with the Teutonic Knights; never comes into effect.
1384	Treaty of Königsberg (1384)	Vytautas agreed to cede Samogitia to the Teutonic Knights in exchange for their support in the war against Jogaila, but the treaty was later broken
1385	Union of Krewo (Note: Also known as the Krėva Act.)	Establishes a dynastic union between Poland and Lithuania.
1386	Treaty of Windsor (1386)	Renews the Anglo-Portuguese Alliance.
1390	Treaty of Königsberg (1390)	Establishes alliance between Vytautas the Great and the Teutonic Order.
1390	Treaty of Lyck	Vytautas agreed to cede Samogitia to the Teutonic Knights in exchange for their support in the war against Jogaila, but the treaty was again broken
1392	Ostrów Agreement	Vytautas and Jogaila made peace, but attacks from the Teutonic Knights continued as a result of the Samogitian dispute
1397	Treaty of Kalmar	Establishes the Kalmar Union; becomes null and void in 1523.
1398	Treaty of Salynas	Vytautas the Great cedes Samogitia to the Teutonic Knights.

== 1400–1499 ==
Year	Name	Summary
1401	Pact of Vilnius and Radom	Reaffirms the Union of Krewo and grants autonomy to the Grand Duchy of Lithuania.
1411	First Peace of Thorn	Ends the Polish–Lithuanian–Teutonic War.
1412	Treaty of Lubowla	Between Władysław II of Poland and Sigismund of Luxemburg, king of Hungary.
1412	Compromise of Caspe	Between the crowns of Aragon and Castile, ensuring the access of the royal House of Trastámara to the Aragonese crown, thus eventually uniting Spain.
1412	Peace of Baden	Signed by the Swiss Confederation and Frederick IV, Duke of Austria, (broken after 2 years by the Swiss)
1412	Treaty of Bourges	some provinces were to be given to Henry IV of England
1413	Union of Horodło (Note: Also known as the Pact of Horodło.)	Reaffirms the Union of Krewo and the Pact of Vilnius and Radom; permits Lithuania to have a separate Grand Duke and parliament.
1416	Ottoman–Venetian maritime treaty (1416)	Maritime trade rights to Republic of Venice
1420	Treaty of Troyes	Attempt to pass the French throne to England.
1422	Treaty of Melno	The Teutonic Knights relinquish Nieszawa to Poland and all claims to Samogitia and northern Lithuania to the Grand Duchy of Lithuania; Poland renounces claims to Pomerelia, Culmerland, and the Michelauer Land east of Culmerland.
1424	Edict of Wieluń	Outlaws Hussitism in the Kingdom of Poland.
1428	Treaty of Delft (Note: Also known as the Reconciliation of Delft.)	Ends hostilities between England and Flanders.
1431	Treaty of Medina del Campo (1431)	Peace between Portugal and Castile; ratified in Almeirim in 1432.
1432	Union of Grodno (1432) (Note: Also known as the Pact of Grodno.)	Reinforces the Polish–Lithuanian union.
1433	Truce of Łęczyca	Mitigates hostilities in the Polish–Teutonic War (1431–35) between the Kingdom of Poland and the Teutonic Order in Łęczyca.
1435	Treaty of Arras (1435)	Reconciles a longstanding feud between King Charles VII of France and Philip, Duke of Burgundy.
1435	Peace of Brześć Kujawski	Ends the Polish–Teutonic War (1431–35).
1441	Treaty of Copenhagen (1441) (Note: Also known as the Peace of Copenhagen.)	Christopher of Bavaria crushed a great peasant rebellion in Northern Jutland; Baltic Sea is opened to Dutch traders.
1443	Treaty of Gyehae	Between the Joseon dynasty and Sō clan (lord of Tsushima Province); controls Japanese piracy and legitimizes trade between Tsushima Island and a Korean port.
1444	Peace of Szeged (Note: Also known as the Treaty of Edirne.)	Between the Kingdom of Hungary and the Ottoman Empire.
1450	Treaty of Bergen	Between Norway and Denmark.
1454	Treaty of Lodi (Note: Also known as the Peace of Lodi.)	Peace between Milan, Florence and Venice.
1454	Treaty of Cölln	State of the Teutonic Order pawns Neumark to Electorate of Brandenburg
1454	Treaty of Constantinople	between the Ottoman Empire and the Republic of Venice
1455	Treaty of Mewe	State of the Teutonic Order sells Neumark to Electorate of Brandenburg
1456	Treaty of Yazhelbitsy	Establishes peace between Vasili II and the people of Novgorod.
1460	Treaty of Ribe	Defines status of Schleswig and Holstein.
1462	Treaty of Westminster (1462) (Note: Also known as the Treaty of Westminster-Ardtornish.)	Divides Scotland between King Edward IV of England and the Earl of Douglas.
1464	Treaty of York (1464)	Made peace between James III of Scotland with Yorkist England
1465	Treaty of Conflans (Note: Also known as the Peace of Conflans.)	Officially ends the Guerre folle (Mad War).
1466	Second Peace of Thorn (1466) (Note: Also known as the Second Treaty of Thorn or Toruń.)	Ends the Thirteen Years' War between Poland and the Teutonic Knights.
1466	Treaty of Soldin (1466)	Duchy of Pomerania becomes a nominal fief of the Electorate of Brandenburg. Implementation failed, war ensued.
1468	Treaty of Péronne (1468)	Between Duke Charles I of Burgundy and King Louis XI of France.
1472	Treaty of Prenzlau	Declares Albert III, Elector of Brandenburg, ruler of Pomerania–Stettin.
1474	Treaty of Utrecht (1474)	Ends the Anglo-Hanseatic War between England and the Hanseatic League led by Lübeck and Danzig.
1474	Treaty of London (1474)	Charles the Bold of Burgundy agrees to support Edward IV's planned invasion of France.
1475	Treaty of Picquigny	Louis XI pays Edward IV to stay in England and not pursue his claim to the French throne.
1478	Treaty of Brno (1478)	Divides Bohemian territories between Ladislaus II of Bohemia and Hungary and Matthias Corvinus.
1479	Peace of Olomouc	Ratifies the Treaty of Brno (1478).
1479	Treaty of Alcáçovas (Note: Also known as the Treaty of Alcáçovas-Toledo.)	Between the Kingdom of Castile and Portugal; ends the Castilian Civil War begun in 1474.
1479	Treaty of Constantinople (1479)	Officially ends the fifteen-year war between Venice and the Ottoman Empire.
1482	Treaty of Fotheringhay	Edward IV of England undertook to place the Duke of Albany on his brother's throne of Scotland.
1482	Treaty of Arras (1482)	Between King Louis XI of France and the governments of the Low Countries.
1482	Treaty of Münsingen	Count Eberhard V reunites the divided County of Württemberg and declares it indivisible.
1484	Treaty of Bagnolo	Ends the War of Ferrara (1482–1484) between Ercole d'Este I and Pope Sixtus IV along with his Venetian allies.
1485	Treaty of Leipzig	Divides Saxony between Ernest, Elector of Saxony and Albert, Duke of Saxony.
1488	Treaty of Sablé (Note: Also known as the Treaty of Verger or the Treaty of Le Verger.)	Duke Francis I of Brittany becomes a vassal of King Charles VIII of France.
1489	Treaty of Medina del Campo (1489)	Primarily a marriage contract between Arthur Tudor and Catherine of Aragon.
1489	Treaty of Frankfurt (1489)	Between Maximilian of Austria and the envoys of King Charles VIII of France.
1489	Treaty of Dordrecht (1489)	Establishes an alliance between Holy Roman Emperor Maximilian I and King Henry VII of England.
1489	Treaty of Redon	Henry VII of England grants Lord Daubeney of Brittany 6000 English troops.
1490	Treaty of Woking (Okyng)	Between King Henry VII of England, and Queen Isabella I of Castile and King Ferdinand II of Aragon, by the Ambassador in London, Dr Rodrigo Gonzalez de la Puebla; for the marriage of Catherine of Aragon to Arthur, Prince of Wales
1491	Peace of Pressburg (1491)	Defines the future succession of the Austrian and Hungarian kingdoms.
1491	Treaty of Granada (1491) (Note: Also known as the Capitulation of Granada.)	Relinquishes the sovereignty of the Moorish Kingdom of Granada to Spain.
1492	Peace of Etaples	Ends war between England and France.
1493	Treaty of Barcelona	France cedes Roussillon and Cerdagne to Spain in return for Spanish neutrality during its war with Italy.
1493	Treaty of Senlis	France cedes the Free County of Burgundy, the County of Artois, Charolais, France and the Low Countries to the House of Habsburg.
1493	Treaty of Pyritz	preliminary end to the Brandenburg-Pomeranian conflict
1494	Treaty of Tordesillas	Divides the world between Spain and Portugal.
1496	Intercursus Magnus	Resolves some trade wars between England and the Netherlands.
1497	Treaty of Ayton	Seven year peace between England and Scotland under the arbitration of Ferdinand and Isabella of Spain.
1499	Treaty of Basel (1499)	Concludes the Swabian War fought between the Swabian League and the Old Swiss Confederacy.

== 1500–1599 ==
Year	Name	Summary
1500	Treaty of Granada	King Ferdinand II of Aragon agrees to support French claims over the Kingdom of Naples.
1501	Treaty of Trente	Austria recognises all French conquests in northern Italy.
1502	Treaty of Perpetual Peace	Ends hostilities between England and Scotland; void in 1513.
1504	Treaty of Blois	Temporarily halts the Italian Wars.
1504	Treaty of Lyons	Louis XII of France cedes Naples to Ferdinand II of Aragon.
1506	Treaty of Windsor (Intercursus Malus)	Arranged the return of the Duke of Suffolk to England from Burgundy and a marriage agreement between Henry VII and sister of Philip, Duke of Burgundy.
1511	Treaty of Westminster	Treaty of alliance between Henry VIII of England and Ferdinand II of Aragon against France.
1516	Peace of Noyon	Divides Italy between France and Spain.
1516	Treaty of Fribourg	Perpetual Peace (1516) signed between the Old Swiss Confederacy and France.
1517	Treaty of Rouen	Attempts to renew the Auld Alliance.
1518	Treaty of London	Establishes a non-aggression pact between France, England, Holy Roman Empire, the Papacy, Spain, Burgundy and the Netherlands.
1521	Treaty of Bruges	Treaty between England and the Holy Roman Empire during the Italian War of 1521–1526
1522	Treaty of Windsor	Between Charles V, Holy Roman Emperor, and Henry VIII of England; its main clause was the invasion of France.
1524	Treaty of Malmö	Ends the Swedish War of Liberation.
1524	Treaty of Tordesillas	Treaty between the Lord of Monaco and Habsburg Spain.
1524	Franco-Polish Alliance	Alliance between the king of France Francis I and the king of Poland Sigismund I.
1525	Treaty of Kraków	Ends the Polish–Teutonic War.
1525	Treaty of the More	Treaty between Henry VIII and the interim French government of Louise of Savoy.
1526	Treaty of Hampton Court	Establishes peace between France and England.
1526	Treaty of Madrid	France relinquishes the Duchy of Burgundy and the Charolais; temporarily ends French interests in Italy.
1526	Alliance treaty between Geneva, Berne and Fribourg	Ending effective Savoy dynasty rule over Geneva. Geneva became part of the Swiss confederation The treaty was concluded on February 20 and ratified on March 12, 1526
1526	Treaty of Berwick	Three year peace agreement between Scotland and England.
1527	Treaty of Westminster	Treaty of alliance between King Henry VIII of England and King Francis I of France against King Charles V of Spain.
1528	Treaty of Gorinchem	Between Charles V, Holy Roman Emperor, and Duke Charles of Guelders.
1529	Treaty of Barcelona	Francis I, returns the Franche-Comté and promises to return the Duchy of Burgundy.
1529	Treaty of Cambrai	Also known as the Paix des Dames (Ladies' Peace).
1529	Treaty of Saragossa	Specifies the anti-meridian line of demarcation between Spanish and Portuguese imperial territories.
1529	Treaty of Grimnitz	House of Hohenzollern and House of Pomerania agree on legal status and succession in the Duchy of Pomerania
1533	Treaty of Constantinople	Ends hostilities between the Ottoman Empire and the Archduchy of Austria.
1534	Treaty of Bassein	Sultan Bahadur of Gujarat cedes the Mumbai Islands and other territories to the Portuguese Empire.
1537	Treaty of Novgorod	Russo-Swedish truce
1538	Treaty of Nagyvárad (Note: Also known as the Treaty of Várad.)	Recognizes John Zápolya as the king of Hungary while Ferdinand I, Holy Roman Emperor retains the western parts of the Hungarian Kingdom.
1541	First Treaty of Brömsebro	Between Denmark–Norway and Sweden.
1543	Treaty of Greenwich (Note: Also known as the Treaties of Greenwich.)	Contains two agreements that attempts to unite the Kingdom of England with the Kingdom of Scotland.
1543	Treaty of Venlo	Duke Wilhelm of Jülich-Cleves-Berg cedes the territory of Guelders and the county of Zutphen to Holy Roman Emperor Charles V.
1544	Treaty of Speyer	Establishes peace between Denmark-Norway and the Holy Roman Empire.
1544	Treaty of Crépy	Holy Roman Emperor Charles V relinquishes his claim to the Duchy of Burgundy and Francis I of France surrenders his claim to the Kingdom of Naples.
1550	Treaty of Boulogne	France paid England a ransom of 400,000 crowns and gained Boulogne also agreed to remove all their remaining men from Scotland. March 28, 1550.
1551	Treaty of Weissenburg (Note: Also known as the Treaty of Karlsburg.)	Declares Archduke Ferdinand of Austria king of Hungary and Transylvania.
1552	Peace of Passau	Holy Roman Emperor Charles V guarantees Lutheran religious freedoms to Protestants.
1552	Treaty of Chambord	Maurice of Saxony cedes Toul, Verdun, and Metz to Henry II of France.
1555	Peace of Augsburg	Between Charles V, Holy Roman Emperor, and the forces of the Schmalkaldic League.
1555	Treaty of Amasya	Ends the war between Ottoman Turkey and Safavid Persia.
1556	Treaty of Vaucelles	King Henry II of France cedes Franche-Comté to King Philip II of Spain.
1557	Treaty of Novgorod	Russia and Sweden, ended the Russo-Swedish War (1554–1557)
1557	Treaty of Pozvol	Livonia and Poland-Lithuania, triggered the Livonian War
1559	Peace of Cateau Cambrésis	Ends the Italian Wars.
1559	Treaty of Vilna	Livonian War: Livonian–Polish–Lithuanian alliance
1560	Treaty of Edinburgh	England, Scotland, France: concludes Siege of Leith, attempts to end Auld Alliance.
1561	Treaty of Vilna	Livonian War: Livonian Order subordinated to Poland-Lithuania
1562	Edict of Saint-Germain (Note: Also known as the Edict of January.)	Recognizes the existence of French Protestants and guarantees them freedom of conscience and private worship.
1562	Treaty of Hampton Court	Establishes military and economic ties between Queen Elizabeth I of England and Huguenot leader Louis I de Bourbon.
1562	Treaty of Mozhaysk	Livonian War, Russo-Danish mutual assurance of their claims in Livonia
1563	Edict of Amboise	Ends the first phase of the French Wars of Religion.
1564	Treaty of Dorpat	Livonian War, Russo-Swedish mutual assurance of their claims in Livonia
1564	Treaty of Troyes	The French gave Queen Elizabeth I 120,000 crowns in return for England to recognise French claim over Calais after losing it in 1558 and its failure to retake it in 1563. This treaty officially ended England's territory claim on mainland France.
1568	Peace of Longjumeau (Note: Also known as the Treaty of Longjumeau or the Edict of Longjumeau.)	Ends the second phase of the French Wars of Religion; confirms the Edict of Amboise; expires in August 1568.
1568	Treaty of Roskilde (1568)	peace between Lübeck, Denmark–Norway and Sweden during the Northern Seven Years' War, not ratified
1569	Union of Lublin	Unites the Kingdom of Poland and the Grand Duchy of Lithuania into a single state, the Polish–Lithuanian Commonwealth.
1570	Treaty of Stettin	Ends the Northern Seven Years' War.
1570	Peace of Saint-Germain-en-Laye	Ends the third phase of the French Wars of Religion.
1572	Treaty of Blois	Queen Elizabeth I of England and Catherine de' Medici of France establish an alliance against Spain.
1573	Edict of Boulogne	Ends the fourth phase of the French Wars of Religion; gives Huguenots the right to worship in La Rochelle, Montauban, and Nîmes.
1576	Edict of Beaulieu (Note: Also known as the Edict of Beaulieu-les-Loches or the Peace of Monsieur.)	Ends the fifth phase of the French Wars of Religion; Henry III of France gives the Huguenots the right of public worship.
1576	Pacification of Ghent	Alliance of the provinces of the Netherlands against the Spanish.
1577	Treaty of Bergerac (Note: Also known as the Edict of Poitiers.)	Ends the sixth phase of the French Wars of Religion; Huguenots can practice their faith only in the suburbs of one town in each judicial district.
1577	Edict of 1577 (Note: Also known as the Perpetual Edict.)	Provides for the removal of Spanish troops from the Netherlands; upholds Pacification of Ghent.
1579	Treaty of Arras (1579)	The members of the Union of Arras conclude a separate peace with Spain in the Eighty Years' War.
1579	Union of Utrecht	Unifies the northern states of the Netherlands.
1580	Treaty of Fleix (Note: Also known as the Edict of Fleix and the Peace of Fleix.)	Ends the seventh phase of the French Wars of Religion; recognizes previous treaties granting religious privileges to the Huguenots.
1580	Treaty of Plessis-les-Tours	François, Duke of Anjou becomes sovereign of the Dutch Republic.
1582	Peace of Jam Zapolski	Ends the Livonian War between Poland and Russia.
1583	Treaty of Plussa	A truce between Russia and Sweden; ends the Livonian War (1558–1583).
1584	Treaty of Joinville	Forms a Catholic alliance between the French Catholic League and Habsburg Spain against Protestant forces such as Elizabeth I of England.
1585	Treaty of Nemours	Revokes previous concessions made to the Huguenots; instigates the War of the Three Henries.
1585	Treaty of Nonsuch	England assists Dutch in the Eighty Years' War.
1586	Treaty of Berwick	Agreement of amity between Queen Elizabeth I of England and King James VI of Scotland.
1590	Treaty of Ferhat Paşa	Ends the war between Ottoman Turkey and Safavid Persia. Turkish control on Caucasus region.
1595	Treaty of Teusina (Note: Also known as the Treaty of Tyavzino or the Eternal Peace with Sweden in Russia.)	Ends the Russo–Swedish War (1590–1595).
1598	Peace of Vervins	The Spanish withdraw from French territory.
1598	Edict of Nantes	Henry IV of France grants French Protestants (or Huguenots) substantial rights in a nation still considered essentially Catholic.

== 1600–1699 ==
Year	Name	Summary
1600	Treaty of Paris (1600)	Between Henry IV of France and Charles Emmanuel I, Duke of Savoy.
1601	Treaty of Lyon (1601)	Henry IV of France acquires Bugey, Valromey, Gex, and Bresse.
1603	Treaty of Mellifont,(1603)	Ends hostilities between England and Gaelic Irish , chieftains, ending the Nine Years' War
1604	Treaty of London, 1604	Ends hostilities between England and Spain.
1606	Peace of Žitava (Note: Also known as the Peace of Zsitvatorok.)	Ends the Long War between the Ottoman Turkey and the Habsburg monarchy.
1606	Treaty of Vienna (1606) (Note: Also known as the Peace of Vienna.)	Restores all constitutional and religious rights/privileges to the Hungarians in both Transylvania and Royal Hungary.
1608	Treaty of Lieben	Holy Roman Emperor Rudolf II surrenders Hungary, Austrian territories near the Danube River, and Moravia to his brother Matthias.
1609	Treaty of Antwerp (1609) (Note: Also known as the Twelve Years Truce.)	Spain and the Netherlands agree to a 12-year truce.
1610	Treaty of Brussol (Note: Also known as the Treaty of Bruzolo.)	Establishes a military alliance between Charles Emmanuel I and Henry IV of France against the Spanish in Italy.
1612	Treaty of Nasuh Pasha	Treaty between Ottoman Turkey and Safavid Persia Revision of 1590 treaty. Persia regained some of its loses in 1590.
1613	Treaty of Knäred	Ends the Kalmar War between Denmark and Sweden.
1613	Two Row Wampum Treaty (Note: Also known as Guswhenta or Kaswhenta.)	Treaty between the Haudenosaunee and representatives of the Dutch government.
1614	Treaty of Xanten	Ends the War of the Jülich Succession.
1615	Peace of Asti	Duke Charles Emmanuel I of Savoy relinquishes claims on Monferrato.
1615	Peace of Tyrnau	Recognizes Gábor Bethlen as the Prince of Transylvania.
1615	Treaty of Serav	Ratifies the treaty of 1612 between Ottoman Turkey and Safavid Persia
1616	Treaty of Loudun	Ends hostilities between Queen Marie de' Medici and rebellious French princes led by Henry II, the third Prince of Condé.
1617	Treaty of Pavia	Savoy cedes Monferrato to Mantua.
1617	Treaty of Stolbovo	Ends the Ingrian War between Sweden and Russia.
1617	Peace of Busza	Peace between Ottoman Turkey and Polish-Lithuanian Commonwealth
1618	Truce of Deulino (Note: Also known as the Treaty of Dywilino.)	Ends the Polish–Russian War (1609–1618); expires in 1632.
1619	Treaty of Angoulême	Ends civil war in France between supporters of Queen Marie de' Medici and her son, King Louis XIII.
1619	Treaty of Munich (1619)	Duke Maximilian of Bavaria allows Holy Roman Emperor Ferdinand II to use his forces in exchange for territories in the Electorate of the Palatinate.
1620	Treaty of Ulm (1620)	The Protestant Union ceases its support of Frederick V of Bohemia.
1621	Peace of Nikolsburg (Note: Also known as the Peace of Mikulov.)	Ends the war between Prince Gabriel Bethlen of Transylvania and Emperor Ferdinand II of the Holy Roman Empire.
1621	Treaty of Madrid (1621)	Restores Valtelline to the Grisons and grants Protestants in the region religious freedoms.
1621	Treaty of Khotyn	Between Ottoman Turkey and Polish–Lithuanian Commonwealth.
1621	Treaty of the Hague (1621)	A failed treaty of alliance between Denmark and the Dutch Republic
1621	Treaty of Bremen	A failed treaty of commerce between Denmark and the Dutch Republic
1622	Treaty of Montpellier (Note: Also known as the Peace of Montpellier.)	Between King Louis XIII and Duke Henry II of Rohan; confirms the Edict of Nantes.
1623	Treaty of Paris (1623)	France, Savoy, and Venice agree to have Spanish forces leave Valtelline.
1625	Treaty of The Hague (1625)	England and the Netherlands agree to economically support Christian IV of Denmark during the Thirty Years' War.
1626	Peace of Pressburg (1626)	Ends the revolt against the Habsburgs.
1626	Treaty of Monzón	France and Spain share equal rights in their control of Valtelline.
1627	Capitulation of Franzburg	Duchy of Pomerania occupied by Albrecht von Wallenstein's imperial army
1628	Treaty of Munich	Recognizes Duke Maximilian of Bavaria as a prince-elector; grants Maximilian control of the Upper Palatinate and the right bank of the Rhine River for thirty years.
1629	Edict of Restitution	Holy Roman Emperor Ferdinand II attempts to reinforce the territorial and religious settlements made after the Peace of Augsburg.
1629	Treaty of Lübeck	Denmark withdraws from the Thirty Years' War.
1629	Truce of Altmark (Note: Also known as the Treaty of Stary Targ.)	Ends hostilities between Sweden and the Polish–Lithuanian Commonwealth.
1629	Peace of Alais (Note: Also known as the Edict of Alès.)	Between the Huguenots and King Louis XIII; confirms the basic principles of the Edict of Nantes with additional clauses.
1629	Treaty of Suza	2 treaties between France, Savoy, England and Scotland
1630	Peace of Regensburg (Note: Also known as the Treaty of Ratisbonne.)	Temporarily halts the War of the Mantuan Succession.
1630	Treaty of Stettin (1630)	The Duchy of Pomerania allies with and is occupied by the Swedish Empire
1630	Treaty of Madrid (1630)	Ends English involvement in the Dutch Revolt.
1631	Treaty of Bärwalde	France and Sweden establish an alliance against the Holy Roman Empire.
1631	Treaty of Cherasco	Ends the War of the Mantuan Succession.
1631	Treaty of Fontainebleau (1631)	France and Bavaria establish a secret "Catholic" alliance.
1632	Treaty of Saint-Germain-en-Laye (1632)	England returns New France (Quebec) to France.
1634	Treaty of Polyanovka (Note: Also known as the Treaty of Polanów or the Treaty of Polyanov.)	Ends the Smolensk War between Poland and Russia.
1635	Peace of Prague (1635)	Between the Holy Roman Emperor, Ferdinand II, and most of the Protestant states of the Holy Roman Empire.
1635	Treaty of Sztumska Wieś (Note: Also known as the Treaty of Stuhmsdorf, the Armistice of Stuhmsdorf, the Peace of Stuhmsdorf, and the Truce of Stuhmsdorf.)	The Swedish Empire concedes territories to the Polish–Lithuanian Commonwealth.
1636	Treaty of Wismar	Establishes alliance between Sweden and France against the Habsburgs.
1638	Treaty of Hamburg (1638)	Confirms Treaty of Wismar; France pays Sweden 1,000,000 livres.
1638	Treaty of Hartford (1638)	Cedes Pequot Indian lands to Connecticut River towns and outlaws Pequot settlement and the use of the Pequot language.
1639	Treaty of Berwick (1639) (Note: Also known as the Peace of Berwick or the Pacification of Berwick.)	Ends the First Bishops' War between Charles I of England and the Scots.
1639	Treaty of Zuhab (Note: Also known as the Peace of Qasr-e-Shirin.)	Ends the war between Safavid Persia and the Ottoman Turkey. The borderline drawn by the treaty is still effective today.
1639	Treaty of Asurar Ali	Establishes the boundary between the Mughals and the Ahom kingdom.
1640	Treaty of Ripon	Between Charles I of England and the Scots in the aftermath of the Second Bishops' War.
1642	Treaty of Axim (1642)	Regulates the jurisdiction of the Netherlands and the Dutch West India Company in the town and polity of Axim.
1643	Solemn League and Covenant	Between the Scottish Covenanters and the leaders of the English Parliamentarians.
1645	Second Treaty of Brömsebro (1645) (Note: Also known as the Peace of Brömsebro.)	Ends the Torstenson War between Sweden and Denmark–Norway.
1647	Truce of Ulm (1647) (Note: Also known as the Treaty of Ulm.)	Forces Duke Maximilian of Bavaria to renounce his alliance with Holy Roman Emperor Ferdinand III.
1648	Peace of Westphalia (Note: Also known as the Treaties of Münster and Osnabrück.)	Ends the Thirty Years' War and the Eighty Years' War, and establishes the principle of the sovereignty of nations in use today.
1648	Treaty of Concordia (Note: Also known as the Partition Treaty of 1648.)	Divides the island of Saint Martin between France and the Netherlands.
1648	Treaty of Münster	Signed between Holy Roman Empire and France on 24 October.
1649	Peace of Rueil	Ends the opening episodes of the Fronde, France's civil war.
1649	Treaty of Zboriv	Places three provinces of Ukraine under the control of the Cossacks.
1650	Treaty of Breda (1650)	Between Charles II of England and the Scottish Covenanters during the Wars of the Three Kingdoms.
1650	Treaty of Hartford (1650)	Establishes boundary lines between New Amsterdam and English settlers in Connecticut.
1651	Treaty of Bila Tserkva	Establishes peace between the Polish–Lithuanian Commonwealth and the Ukrainian Cossacks after the Battle of Berestechko.
1652	Treaty of Oistins	Establishes peace between colonial settlers of Barbados and the English Commonwealth over Barbados's right to trade with Spanish controlled Netherlands among other demands. Results in establishing one of the first parliaments in the new world and the third oldest in the British Commonwealth
1653	Treaty of Stettin (1653)	The Swedish Empire and Brandenburg partition Pomerania.
1654	Treaty of Pereiaslav	Between Russia and Cossack Hetmanate.
1654	Treaty of Westminster (1654)	Ends the First Anglo-Dutch War.
1655	Treaty of Kėdainiai	Second Northern War – Grand Duchy of Lithuania becomes Swedish protectorate
1655	Union of Kėdainiai	Second Northern War – Lithuanian–Swedish union
1655	Treaty of Rinsk	Second Northern War – anti-Swedish alliance of Brandenburg-Prussia and Royal Prussian estates
1656	Treaty of Königsberg (1656)	Second Northern War – Duchy of Prussia and Ermland become Swedish fiefs.
1656	Treaty of Marienburg	Second Northern War – alliance between Brandenburg-Prussia and Sweden
1656	Treaty of Elbing	Second Northern War – Dutch-Swedish settlement of conflicts over Danzig (Gdańsk)
1656	Treaty of Labiau	Second Northern War – Hohenzollerns become full souvereigns in Prussia and Ermland.
1656	Truce of Vilna	Second Northern War / Russo-Polish War – Russo-Polish truce and alliance against Sweden
1656	Treaty of Vienna (1656)	Second Northern War: 1st Habsburg–Polish alliance against Sweden
1656	Treaty of Radnot	It envisaged a partition of the Polish–Lithuanian Commonwealth; Transylvania enters the Second Northern War on the Swedish side
1656	Treaty of Butre (1656)	Between the Gold Coast (West Africa) state of Ahanta and the States General and the Dutch West India Company, establishing a Dutch protectorate over Butre and Upper Ahanta.
1657	Treaty of Vienna (1657)	Second Northern War: 2nd Habsburg–Polish alliance against Sweden
1657	Treaty of Wehlau	Second Northern War: Poland accepts Hohenzollerns as full souvereigns in Prussia, anti-Swedish alliance.
1657	Treaty of Bromberg (Bydgoszcz)	Second Northern War – Wehlau confirmed and amended
1657	Treaty of Paris (1657)	Establishes military alliance between England and France against Spain.
1657	Treaty of Raalte	Willem III is no longer the viceroy of Overijssel.
1658	Treaty of Hadiach	Between Poland and Cossack Hetmanate.
1658	Treaty of Taastrup (Note: Also known as the Høje Taastrup Peace.)	An accord that preceded the Treaty of Roskilde between Charles X Gustav of Sweden and King Frederick III of Denmark.
1658	Treaty of Roskilde	Second Northern War: Denmark–Norway cedes territory (Blekinge, Bornholm, Bohuslän, Scania, Trøndelag, Halland) to Sweden.
1658	Treaty of Valiesar	Second Northern War: Sweden temporarily cedes territory to Russia, cession of hostilities.
1659	Treaty of the Pyrenees	Ends war between France and Spain.
1659	Concert of The Hague (1659)	Second Northern War – Anglo-Franco-Dutch agreement regarding peace between Denmark and Swede
1660	Treaty of Copenhagen (1660)	Second Northern War – peace between Denmark and Sweden, restores Trondheim to Norway and Bornholm to Denmark.
1660	Treaty of Oliva (Note: Also known as the Peace of Oliva.)	Second Northern War – peace between Sweden, Brandenburg-Prussia and Poland.
1661	Treaty of Cardis (Note: Also known as the Peace of Cardis.)	Second Northern War – peace between Sweden and Russia.
1661	Treaty of Den Haag	The Dutch Empire recognizes Portuguese imperial sovereignty over Recife in Brazil.
1662	Treaty of Montmartre	Duke Charles IV gives to Louis XIV the throne to the Duchy of Lorraine.
1663	Treaty of Ghilajharighat	Between the Ahoms and the Mughal forces.
1664	Peace of Vasvár	Between the Austrian Habsburg monarchy and the Ottoman Turkey after the Battle of Saint Gotthard; lasted until 1683.
1665	Treaty of Purandar (1665) (Note: Also known as the Treaty of Purandhar.)	Between Rajput Jai Singh and Shivaji Maharaj.
1666	Treaty of Habenhausen	Peace negotiations after the Second Swedish war on Bremen between Sweden and the city of Bremen.
1666	1666 Articles of Peace and Amity	Treaty between the Province of Maryland and 12 Eastern Algonquian-speaking indigenous nations, including the Piscataway, Anacostanck, Doegs, Mikikiwomans, Manasquesend, Mattawoman, Chingwawateick, Hangemaick, Portobackes, Sacayo, Panyayo, and Choptico.
1667	Treaty of Breda (1667)	Ends the Second Anglo-Dutch War.
1667	Treaty of Andrusovo	Ends the war between Russia and Poland-Lithuania.
1667	Treaty of Bongaja	Sultan Hasanuddin of Makassar recognizes the influence of the Dutch East India Company (VOC) in Indonesian territories.
1668	First Triple Alliance	Alliance between England, the United Provinces and Sweden.
1668	Treaty of Aix-la-Chapelle (1668)	Ends the War of Devolution between Louis XIV's France and Habsburg Spain.
1668	Treaty of Lisbon (1668)	Spain recognizes Portuguese sovereignty after the Portuguese Restoration War; Portugal cedes Ceuta to Spain.
1670	Secret Treaty of Dover	France helps England to rejoin the Roman Catholic Church and England assists France militarily against the Dutch Republic.
1670	Treaty of Madrid (1670)	Between England and Spain.
1670	Treaty of Copenhagen (1670)	An alliance and commercial treaty between Britain and Denmark-Norway, establishing terms of contraband and permitting Danish settlement of the Virgin Islands
1672	Treaty of Buczacz	Between the Polish–Lithuanian Commonwealth and Ottoman Turkey. Podolia under Turkish control.
1674	Treaty of Westminster (1674)	Ends the Third Anglo-Dutch War.
1675	Strasbourg Agreement (1675)	First international agreement banning the use of chemical weapons (i.e. poisoned bullets); signed between France and the Holy Roman Empire.
1676	Treaty of Żurawno	Between Ottoman Turkey and Polish–Lithuanian Commonwealth Ratifies 1672 treaty.
1677	Treaty of 1677 (Note: Also known as the Treaty Between Virginia And The Indians 1677)	Native American tribes in Virginia swear fealty to the British Empire.
1678	Treaties of Nijmegen	Ends the Franco-Dutch War.
1678	Treaty of Casco (1678)	Ends war between the eastern Native Americans and the English settlers of Massachusetts Bay Colony.
1679	Treaty of Saint-Germain-en-Laye (1679)	Swedish Pomerania and Bremen-Verden restored to Sweden after the Scanian War
1681	Treaty of Bakhchisarai	Concludes the Russo-Turkish War (1676–1681); establishes a 20-year truce whereby the Dnieper River would separate the Ottoman Empire from Russian territories.
1684	Truce of Ratisbon	Ends War of Reunions between France and Spain
1686	Eternal Peace Treaty of 1686	Ends war between Russia and Poland.
1689	Treaty of Nerchinsk	Ends war between the Russian Empire and the Qing dynasty of China.
1691	Treaty of Limerick	Ends the Williamite War in Ireland.
1697	Treaty of Ryswick	Ends the War of the Grand Alliance.
1698	Treaty of Den Haag (1698) (Note: Also known as the Treaty of The Hague or the First Partition Treaty.)	Attempts to resolve the issue of who would inherit the Spanish throne.
1699	Treaty of Karlowitz (Note: Also known as the Treaty of Karlovci.)	Ends the war between the alliance consisting of Austria, Venice and Polish–Lithuanian Commonwealth on one side and the Ottoman Turkey on the other side.
1699	Treaty of Preobrazhenskoye	Denmark, Russia, Saxony, and the Polish–Lithuanian Commonwealth divide Swedish territories.

== 1700–1799 ==
Year	Name	Summary
1700	Treaty of London (Note: Also known as the Second Partition Treaty.)	An attempt to restore the Pragmatic Sanction following the death of Joseph Ferdinand, Electoral Prince of Bavaria.
1700	Treaty of Constantinople	Establishes peace between Russia and the Ottoman Empire.
1700	Peace of Travendal	Temporary peace between the Swedish Empire and Denmark–Norway during the Great Northern War.
1701	Great Peace of Montreal	Establishes peace between New France and the 39 First Nations of North America.
1701	Treaty of The Hague (1701)	England, Austria, the United Provinces, and the Holy Roman Empire establish a defensive alliance against France.
1703	Methuen Treaty	Between Portugal and the Kingdom of England.
1704	Treaty of Ilbersheim	Removes Bavaria from the War of the Spanish Succession.
1704	Treaty of Narva	Great Northern War: Saxon–Polish–Lithuanian–Russian alliance.
1705	Treaty of Warsaw	Great Northern War: Polish–Lithuanian–Swedish alliance.
1705	Pact of Genoa	War of the Spanish Succession: alliance between the Kingdom of England and the Principality of Catalonia.
1706	Treaty of Altranstädt	Great Northern War – peace between Augustus the Strong, king of Poland and elector of Saxony, and Charles XII of Sweden. Augustus resigns as king.
1707	Convention of Milan	Ends the fighting in northern Italy between France and Austria.
1707	Treaty of Altranstädt (1707)	Holy Roman Emperor Joseph I guarantees to Charles XII of Sweden religious tolerance and liberty of conscience for Silesian Protestants.
1707	Treaty of Union	Unites the Kingdoms of England and Scotland to create the Kingdom of Great Britain.
1709	Treaty of Thorn	Great Northern War: Saxon–Polish–Lithuanian-Russian alliance.
1709	Treaty of Copenhagen	Great Northern War: Russo-Danish alliance
1710	Capitulation of Estonia and Livonia	Great Northern War: Estonian and Livonian estates and towns surrender to Russia.
1710	Treaty of Hanover	Great Northern War: Hanoveranian–Russian alliance.
1711	Treaty of Szatmár (Note: Also known as the Peace of Szatmár.)	Ends the Kuruc Rebellion led by Francis II Rákóczi.
1711	Treaty of Pruth	Between Ottoman Turkey and Russia, Russia loses some territories and grants a free passage for Charles XII of Sweden.
1712	Peace of Aarau	Ends the Toggenburg War among the Swiss cantons
1713	Treaty of Utrecht	Ends the War of the Spanish Succession.
1713	Treaty of Portsmouth	Ends Queen Anne's War hostilities between the Abenakis and the Province of Massachusetts Bay.
1713	Treaty of Schwedt	Great Northern War: Russo-Prussian alliance
1714	Treaty of Baden	Ends hostilities between France and the Holy Roman Empire and also ends the War of the Spanish Succession.
1714	Treaty of Rastatt	Ends the War of the Spanish Succession; hostilities between Louis XIV of France and Holy Roman Emperor Charles VI cease.
1715	Treaty of Stettin	Great Northern War: Hanoveranian–British–Prussian alliance
1715	Treaty of Berlin	Great Northern War: Hanoveranian–British–Danish–Norwegian alliance
1715	Treaty of Greifswald	Great Northern War: Hanoveranian–British–Russian alliance
1717	Second Triple Alliance	Alliance between Kingdom of Great Britain, the United Provinces and France.
1718	Treaty of Passarowitz (Note: Also known as the Treaty of Požarevac.)	Ends the war between Austria and the Ottoman Empire.
1718	Treaty of Baden	Ends the Toggenburg War among the Swiss cantons (second treaty).
1720	Treaty of Den Haag (Note: Also known as the Treaty of The Hague.)	Spain abandons her claims in Italy after the War of the Quadruple Alliance.
1720	Treaty of Frederiksborg	Ends Great Northern War between Sweden and Denmark–Norway.
1720	Treaty of Stockholm	Ends the Great Northern War between Sweden, Hanover and Brandenburg-Prussia
1721	Treaty of Nystad	Ends the Great Northern War between Sweden and Russia.
1721	Treaty of Tetuan	First treaty between Morocco and Great Britain signed on 23 January 1721 by Charles Stewart and the Pasha of Tetuan, and later ratified by King George I and Sultan Ismail: 300 English captives were freed and English merchants were allowed special capitulations in Moroccan harbors. The treaty guaranteed a strategic supply line for Gibraltar.
1725	Treaty of Hanover	Establishes a military alliance between Great Britain, France, Prussia, Sweden, the Netherlands and Denmark against Spain.
1725	Treaty of Vienna	Ends Austrian claims to the Spanish throne; Austria helps Spain to reacquire Gibraltar from the British.
1727	Treaty of Kyakhta	Redefines boundaries between Russia and China.
1729	Treaty of Seville (1729)	Britain maintains control over Port Mahon and Gibraltar.
1731	Treaty of Vienna (1731)	Verifies the Quadruple Alliance between the Holy Roman Empire, Britain, the Dutch Empire, and Spain.
1732	Treaty of Ahmet Pasha	Short lived peace treaty, ends hostalities between the Ottoman Turkey and the Safavid Persia
1732	Löwenwolde's Treaty (Note: Also known as the Treaty of the Three Black Eagles and as the Treaty of Berlin.)	Establishes a joint policy between Austria, the Russian Empire, and Prussia pertaining to the succession of the Polish throne.
1732	Treaty of Rasht	Ends Russian claims over Persian territories.
1733	Treaty of Turin (1733)	Secret treaty between France and the Duke of Savoy for military alliance prior to War of the Polish Succession.
1733	Treaty of the Escorial	First of the Bourbon Family Compacts between France and Spain, agreeing to mutual defense and military alliance in the conquest of Italian territories held by the Habsburgs.
1736	Treaty of Constantinople (1736)	Ends hostilities between the Ottoman Empire and Safavid Persia
1738	Treaty of Vienna (1738)	Ends the War of the Polish Succession.
1739	Treaty of El Pardo (1739)	Spain and Great Britain settle their respective claims to American navigation and trade.
1739	Treaty of Niš (1739)	Ends the war between Russia and the Ottoman Empire.
1739	Treaty of Belgrade	Ends the war between Austria and the Ottoman Empire.
1740	Treaty of Friendship and Alliance	Between the Miskito nation and Kingdom of Great Britain.
1742	Treaty of Berlin (1742)	Ends First Silesian War.
1742	Treaty of Breslau	Ends First Silesian War.
1742	Convention of Turin	Ends Austria and Sardinia promise to assist each other against Spain.
1743	Treaty of Åbo (Note: Also known as the Treaty of Turku.)	Ends the Hats' Russian War.
1743	Treaty of Worms (1743)	Establishes political alliance between the Kingdom of Great Britain, Austria and Sardinia.
1745	Treaty of Dresden	Austria confirms the loss of Silesia to Prussia after the Second Silesian War.
1745	Treaty of Fontainebleau (1745)	Establishes a military alliance between Louis XV of France and Charles Edward Stuart against George II of Great Britain.
1745	Treaty of Füssen	Ends Bavaria's support of the French in the War of the Austrian Succession.
1746	Treaty of Kerden	Ends hostalities between Ottoman Turkey and Afsharid Iran
1748	Treaty of Aix-la-Chapelle (1748)	Ends the War of the Austrian Succession.
1750	Treaty of Madrid (13 January 1750)	Defines the boundaries of the Spanish and the Portuguese colonies in South America, replacing the Treaty of Tordesillas.
1752	Treaty of Aranjuez (1752)	Recognizes Spanish and Austrian interests in Italy.
1755	Treaty of Giyanti (Note: Also known as the Treaty of Gianti Java or Gianti Agreement.)	Divides the Sultanate of Mataram between Prince Mangkubumi and Pakubuwono III.
1756	Treaty of Westminster (1756)	Treaty of neutrality between Prussia and the British Empire.
1757	Treaty of Alinagar	Between the British East India Company and the Nawab of Bengal, India.
1758	Treaty of Easton	Native Americans agree not to fight the British during the French and Indian War.
1761	Treaty of El Pardo (1761)	Nullifies the Treaty of Madrid (13 January 1750).
1762	Treaty of Fontainebleau (1762)	A secret agreement whereby France cedes Louisiana to Spain.
1762	Treaty of Saint Petersburg (1762)	Ends the Seven Years' War between Russia and Prussia.
1762	Treaty of Hamburg (1762)	Between Prussia and Sweden after Russia breaks its alliance with Prussia.
1763	Treaty of Hubertusburg	Ends the Seven Years' War.
1763	First Treaty of Paris (Note: Also known as the Peace of Paris and the Treaty of 1763.)	Ends the Seven Years' War.
1765	Treaty of Allahabad	Mughal Emperor Shah Alam II grants Diwani rights to the British East India Company, India.
1766	Treaty of Batticaloa (Note: Also known as the Hanguranketha Treaty.)	King Keerthisiri Rajasinghe of Kandy recognizes Dutch imperial possessions in Sri Lanka.
1768	Treaty of Fort Stanwix	In North America, the boundary established by the Proclamation of 1763 is moved west.
1768	Treaty of Masulipatam	Confirms the conquest of the state of Hyderabad by the British.
1768	Treaty of Versailles	Genoa put Corsica in pledge to France
1770	Treaty of Lochaber	The Cherokee relinquish territories to the British Empire.
1773	Treaty of Tsarskoye Selo	Exchanges Russian and Danish territories in Schleswig–Holstein and the Duchy of Oldenburg.
1774	Treaty of Küçük Kaynarca	Ends Russo-Turkish War (1768–74).
1775	Treaty of Faizabad	Nawab Of Awadh surrendered the sovereignty over the state of Banaras to East India Company.
1776	Treaty of Watertown	Alliance between the State of Massachusetts Bay and the Mi'kmaq of Nova Scotia.
1776	Treaty of Purandar (1776)	Between the peshwa of the Maratha people and the British East India Company, India.
1777	First Treaty of San Ildefonso	Ends disputes between Portugal and Spain over the territories of The Seven Missions and of Colonia del Sacramento.
1777	Treaty of Aranjuez (1777)	Defines Spanish and French colonies on Santo Domingo.
1778	Treaty of Amity and Commerce (United States–France) (Note: Also known as the Treaty of Amity and Commerce between The United States and France.)	Establishes a commercial alliance between the United States and France
1778	Treaty of Alliance (1778) (Note: Also known as the Franco-American Alliance.)	Establishes a military alliance between the United States and France.
1778	Treaty of El Pardo (1778)	Queen Maria I of Portugal cedes Annobón, Bioko, and territories on the Guinea coast to King Charles III of Spain.
1778	Treaty of Fort Pitt (1778) (Note: Also known as the Treaty with the Delawares or the Fourth Treaty of Pittsburgh.)	Gives the United States permission to travel through Lenape (Delaware) territory, as well as to call upon the Lenape to help American troops fight against the British.
1779	Treaty of Aranjuez (1779)	Spain joins the American Revolutionary War against the Kingdom of Great Britain.
1779	Treaty of Teschen	Ends the War of the Bavarian Succession between Austria and Prussia.
1779	Treaty of Aynalıkavak	Ratifies the terms of the Treaty of Küçük Kaynarca
1780	Treaty of Aranjuez (1780)	Morocco recognized Spanish rule over Melilla.
1782	1782 Edict of Tolerance	Holy Roman Emperor Joseph II promotes religious tolerance towards Jews.
1782	Treaty of Salbai	Between the Maratha Empire and the British East India Company, India.
1783	Treaty of Amity and Commerce (United States–Sweden)	Sweden becomes the first neutral nation to officially recognize the young American republic.
1783	Second Treaty of Paris	Ends the American Revolutionary War.
1783	Treaty of Georgievsk	Establishes the east Georgian Kingdom of Kartli-Kakheti as a protectorate under suzerainty of the Russian Empire.
1784	Treaty of Fort Stanwix	The Haudenosaunee Confederacy cedes all lands west of the Niagara River to the United States.
1784	Treaty of Mangalore	Ends the Second Anglo-Mysore War.
1785	Treaty of Fontainebleau	Reinforces the Treaty of Münster whereby the Scheldt Estuary is under the sovereignty of the United Provinces.
1785	Treaty of Amity and Commerce (Prussia–United States)	Between the Kingdom of Prussia and the United States promoting free trade and demanding the unconditionally humane custody for war prisoner, a novelty at the time.
1785	Treaty of Hopewell	Between the United States and the Cherokee Indians.
1785	Treaty of Fort McIntosh	Native American tribes cede to the United States all claims to land in the Ohio Country east of the Cuyahoga and Muskingum rivers; tribes also cede the areas surrounding Fort Detroit and Fort Michilimackinac.
1785	Maryland–Virginia Compact of 1785	Interstate compact between the U.S. states of Maryland and Virginia governing navigational and fishing rights on Chesapeake Bay, and on the Potomac and Pocomoke rivers.
1786	Eden Agreement	Between the Kingdom of Great Britain and France.
1786	Moroccan–American Treaty of Friendship	The oldest non-broken friendship treaty between Morocco and the United States.
1786	Treaty of Hartford (1786)	Interstate compact resolving territorial and border disputes between the states of New York and Massachusetts.
1786	Treaty of Hopewell	Between the United States, the Choctaw Indians, and the Chickasaw Indians.
1786	Jay–Gardoqui Treaty	Trade treaty between United States and Spain. Not ratified by U.S. government
1786	Convention of London (1786)	Great Britain agrees to evacuate Mosquito Coast in exchange for Spanish concessions in present-day Belize.
1787	Treaty of Beaufort (Note: Also known as the Beaufort Convention.)	Interstate compact officially establishing the all-river boundary between the states of Georgia and South Carolina.
1788	Third Triple Alliance	Alliance between Kingdom of Great Britain, the United Provinces and Kingdom of Prussia.
1788	First Treaty of Buffalo Creek	Between the Seneca tribe of Western New York and certain purchasers of rights to the Indians' land.
1789	Treaty of Fort Harmar	Between the United States government and several Native American tribes with claims to the Ohio Country.
1790	Treaty of Reichenbach (1790)	Between Frederick William II of Prussia and Holy Roman Emperor Leopold II of Austria.
1790	Treaty of Värälä	Ends Russo-Swedish War (1788–1790).
1790	Treaty of New York (1790)	Between the United States government and the Creek people.
1791	Treaty of Holston	Settles disputes between the United States and the Cherokee over the territories south of the Ohio River; proclaimed and amended in 1792.
1791	Treaty of Sistova	Ends the war between Ottoman Turkey and Austria (1787–1791)
1792	Treaty of Jassy	Ends the Russo-Turkish War (1787–1792).
1792	Treaty of Seringapatam	Ends the Third Anglo-Mysore War.
1794	Jay Treaty (Note: Also known as the Treaty of London.)	Resolves several issues remaining between the United States and the Kingdom of Great Britain since the Treaty of Paris of 1783.
1794	Treaty of Canandaigua	Establishes peace and friendship between the United States and the Six Nations of the Haudenosaunee (Iroquois).
1795	Pinckney's Treaty (Note: Also known as the Treaty of San Lorenzo, the Treaty of Madrid, and the Treaty of Friendship, Limits, and Navigation Between Spain and the United States.)	Defines boundaries of the United States and Spanish colonies.
1795	Treaty of Peace and Friendship between the United States and the Regency of Algiers	Ransom against piracy
1795	Treaty of The Hague (1795) (Note: Also known as the Hedges Treaty.)	The Batavian Republic cedes Venlo, Flanders, and Maastricht to France.
1795	Treaty of Greenville	Ends the war between the United States and a coalition of Native Americans.
1795	Treaty of Basel	Three agreements whereby France made peace with Prussia, Spain and Hessen-Kassel; concludes the early stage of the French Revolutionary Wars against the First Coalition (1792–1795).
1796	Treaty with Tripoli (1796) (Note: Also known as the Treaty of Peace and Friendship.)	Ends the war between the United States and Tripoli.
1796	Treaty of New York (1796)	Between the Seven Nations of Canada and New York State.
1796	Treaty of Colerain	Affirms the binding of the Treaty of New York (1790) and establishes the boundary line between the Creek Nation and the United States.
1796	Second Treaty of San Ildefonso	Treaty of alliance between Spain and France against Britain.
1797	Treaty of Leoben (Note: Also known as the Peace of Leoben.)	Preliminary accord to the Treaty of Campo Formio; Austria loses Belgium and Lombardy in exchange for Istria and Dalmatia.
1797	Treaty of Campo Formio	Austria recognizes hegemony of French Republic over northern Italy and Belgium. Effective end of the War of the First Coalition (1792–1797).
1797	Treaty of Tolentino	Between France and the Papal States.
1797	Treaty with Tunis (1797)	Peace treaty between the United States and the 'Barbary State' of Tunis, nominally part of the Ottoman Empire.
1797	Treaty of Big Tree	Treaty between the Seneca Nation, part of the Haudenosaunee Confederacy and United States that created reservations for the Seneca and reduced their lands significantly.

== 1800–1899 ==
Year	Name	Summary
1800	Third Treaty of San Ildefonso (Note: Also known as the Preliminary and Secret Treaty between the French Republic and His Catholic Majesty the King of Spain, Concerning the Aggrandizement of His Royal Highness the Infant Duke of Parma in Italy and the Retrocession of Louisiana.)	Spain cedes the Louisiana Territory to France.
1800	Treaty of Mortefontaine (Note: Also known as the Convention of 1800.)	Ends the Quasi-War between the United States and France.
1801	Carnatic Treaty	The Nawab of Arcot cedes territories in India to Great Britain for two hundred rupees, India.
1801	Treaty of Aranjuez (1801)	Confirms the Third Treaty of San Ildefonso between Spain and France.
1801	Treaty of Badajoz (1801) (Note: Also known as the Peace of Badajoz.)	Portugal cedes Olivenza to Spain and agrees to close its harbors to Great Britain.
1801	Treaty of Madrid (1801)	Confirms the Treaty of Badajoz (1801) between Portugal and France; Portugal also agrees to pay 20 million francs and cedes half of Guiana.
1801	Treaty of Florence	The Kingdom of Naples cedes some central Italian possessions, the island of Elba, and the Athena of Velletri to France.
1801	Treaty of Lunéville	Ends the War of the Second Coalition against France.
1802	Treaty of Amiens	Ends the war between France and Great Britain.
1802	Treaty of Bassein	The Maratha Peshwa of Pune cedes territories in western India to Great Britain, India.
1802	Treaty of Al Arish	Napoleon agrees to return Egypt to the Ottoman Empire
1803	Louisiana Purchase	United States buys the Louisiana Territory from France.
1803	Treaty of Surji-Anjangaon	Between Great Britain and Daulat Rao Sindhia, chief of the Maratha Empire; treaty was revised twice.
1803	Treaty of Fort Wayne	Between the United States and the Lenape, Shawnee, Potowatomi, Miami, and Kickapoo Indians, defining the boundaries of the Vincennes Tract in southwest Indiana.
1804	Treaty of St. Louis (1804)	The Sac and Fox Indians cede Illinois to the United States.
1805	Treaty of Saint Petersburg (1805)	Great Britain and Russia agree to alliance against France
1805	Treaty of Tripoli (1805)	Between the United States and the Pasha of Tripoli, ending the First Barbary War.
1805	Treaty of Fort Industry	The Odawa, Ojibwe, Wyandot, Potawatomi, Lenape, and Shawnee Indians cede eastern Ohio to the United States.
1805	Treaty of Potsdam (1805)	Prussia agrees with Russia to join the Third Coalition against France if Napoleon rejects peace terms.
1805	Treaty of Schönbrunn (1805)	Prussian treaty of friendship with France.
1805	Peace of Pressburg (1805)	Between France and Austria, ending Austria's participation in the War of the Fourth Coalition.
1806	Treaty of Poznań	Ends the war between France and Saxony after the latter's defeat during the War of the Fourth Coalition.
1807	Treaty of Finckenstein	Between France and Persia.
1807	Treaties of Tilsit	France, Russia, and Prussia create the Duchy of Warsaw.
1807	Russo-Serbian Alliance (1807)	Between Russia and Serbian rebels.
1807	Treaty of Fontainebleau (October 1807)	Between Spain and France, proposing the partition of Portugal.
1807	Treaty of Fontainebleau (November 1807)	Holland cedes Vlissingen to France and receives East Frisia.
1807	Treaty of Detroit	The Odawa, Ojibwe, Wyandot, and Potawatomi Indians cede parts of Michigan and Ohio to the United States.
1808	Convention of Cintra	France withdraws from Portugal.
1808	Treaty of Fort Clark (Note: Also known as the Treaty with the Osage or the Osage Treaty.)	The Osage Nation cedes large portions of the Missouri Territory to the United States.
1809	Treaty of the Dardanelles (Note: Also known as the Dardanelles Treaty of Peace, Commerce, and Secret Alliance, the Treaty of Çanak, and the Treaty of Chanak.)	Between the Ottoman Empire and Great Britain.
1809	Apodaca–Canning treaty	Between Spain and Great Britain.
1809	Treaty of Amritsar, 1809	Between Ranjit Singh and the British East India Company, restricting the Sikh Empire to north of the Sutlej River, India.
1809	Treaty of Hamina (Note: Also known as the Treaty of Fredrikshamn.)	Ends the Finnish War between Sweden and Russia.
1809	Treaty of Fort Wayne (1809)	The Lenape (Delaware), Eel River, Miami, Potawatomi, Kickapoo, and Wea Indians cede part of Indiana to the United States.
1809	Treaty of Schönbrunn (Note: Also known as the Treaty of Vienna.)	Ends the War of the Fifth Coalition against Napoleon.
1810	Treaty of Paris (1810)	Ends the war between France and Sweden.
1812	Treaty of Paris (24 February 1812)	Prussian alliance with France against Russia
1812	Treaty of Paris (14 March 1812)	Austrian alliance with France against Russia
1812	Treaty of Bucharest (1812)	Ends the Russo-Turkish War (1806–12).
1812	Treaties of Örebro	Ends the Anglo-Russian War (1807–1812) and Anglo-Swedish war of 1810–1812.
1812	Convention of Tauroggen	Armistice between Ludwig von Yorck's Prussian troops and Russia.
1813	Treaty of Kalisz (1813)	Russia and Prussia establish the Kalisz Union against Napoleon.
1813	Treaty of Stockholm (1813)	Great Britain and Sweden agree to military cooperation against France
1813	Treaties of Reichenbach	Great Britain, Russia, Prussia, and Austria establish the Sixth Coalition against Napoleon.
1813	Treaty of Peterswaldau	Great Britain agrees to pay for 10,000 German troops in Russian service.
1813	Treaty of Töplitz (Note: Also known in other spellings as the Treaty of Toeplitz and the Treaty of Toplitz.)	Great Britain, Russia, Prussia, and Austria augment the Sixth Coalition against Napoleon.
1813	Treaty of Ried	Bavaria pledges to Austria to leave the Confederation of the Rhine and join the Sixth Coalition against Napoleon.
1813	Treaty of Gulistan	Between Russia and Qajarid Persia.
1813	Treaty of Fulda	Württemberg agrees with Austria to leave the Confederation of the Rhine.
1813	Treaty of Valençay	Napoleon restores Ferdinand VII of Spain to his throne
1814	Treaty of Naples (1814)	Naples joins the Sixth Coalition against France
1814	Treaty of Kiel	The king of Denmark–Norway cedes Norway to The king of Sweden in exchange for territories in Pomerania.
1814	Treaty of Troyes (1814)	Russia, Prussia and Austria separate their armies during the campaign in north-east France (1814)
1814	Treaty of Chaumont	Austria, Great Britain, Prussia and Russia agree to alliance against France
1814	Treaty of Fontainebleau (1814)	Russia, Prussia, and Austria accept Napoleon's abdication as Emperor of France, and allow him to remain Emperor of Elba.
1814	Convention of Mantua	Italy is returned to provisional Austrian rule
1814	Treaty of Paris	Ends the War of the Sixth Coalition against France.
1814	Eight Articles of London	Amalgamates the Netherlands and Belgium.
1814	Treaty of Fort Jackson (Note: Also known as the Treaty with the Creeks, 1814.)	The Creek Indians cede territories to the United States.
1814	Anglo-Dutch Treaty of 1814 (Note: Also known as the Convention of London.)	Between the Great Britain and the United Provinces (Netherlands).
1814	Convention of Moss	Armistice agreement and de facto peace treaty between Norway and Sweden.
1814	Treaty of Ghent	Ends the War of 1812 between Great Britain and the United States.
1815	Treaty of Paris (1815)	Follows the defeat of Napoleon at the Battle of Waterloo.
1815	Final Act of the Congress of Vienna	Ends the Napoleonic Wars.
1815	Kandyan Convention	Between the British governor of Ceylon, Sir Robert Brownrigg, and the chiefs of the Kandyan Kingdom.
1815	Sugauli Treaty (Note: Also known as the Segowlee Treaty.)	Ends the Anglo-Nepalese War between Great Britain and Nepal.
1815	Treaty of Springwells	The United States restored relations with the Wyandot, Lenape, Seneca, Shawnee, Miami, Ojibwe, Odawa, and Potawatomi Indians, absolving them for supporting Great Britain in the War of 1812.
1815	Quadruple Alliance (1815)	Between the UK, Austria, Prussia and Russia.
1815	Treaty of peace concluded between His United States of America and his Highness Omar Bashaw Dey of Algiers	Ended the Second Barbary War.
1815	Treaty of Nicolls' Outpost	Between the UK and Red Stick and allied Native Americans (unratified)
1816	Treaty of St. Louis (1816)	The Council of Three Fires cedes a 20-mile (32 km) strip of land, which connected Chicago and Lake Michigan with the Illinois River.
1817	Rush–Bagot Treaty	Settles boundary disputes between the United States and Great Britain.
1817	Treaty of Fort Meigs (Note: Also known as the Treaty of the Foot of the Rapids.)	Between the United States and the Wyandot, Seneca, Lenape, Shawnee, Potawatomi, Odawa and Ojibwe tribes.
1817	Treaty of Titalia	The British East India Company restores land taken by Nepal to the chogyal (monarch) of Sikkim, who acknowledges the company as overlord, India.
1818	Treaty of 1818 (Note: Also known as the Convention respecting fisheries, boundary, and the restoration of slaves, the London Convention, the Convention of 1818, or the Anglo-American Convention of 1818.)	Resolves boundary disputes between the United States and the Great Britain; leaves the Oregon Country open to both countries.
1818	Treaty of St. Mary's	Between the United States and the Miami people.
1818	Treaty of the Creek Agency (1818)	Between the United States and the Creek people.
1818	Treaty of St. Louis (1818)	The Osage Nation cedes all territories to the United States beginning at the Arkansas River and ending at the Verdigris River.
1818	Quintuple Alliance	France joined the quadruple alliance.
1819	Adams–Onís Treaty (Note: Also known as the Treaty of Amity, Settlement, and Limits Between the United States of America and His Catholic Majesty, the Transcontinental Treaty of 1819, and the Florida Purchase Treaty.)	Settles a border dispute between the United States and Spain.
1819	Treaty of Saginaw	Native Americans cede land to the United States.
1820	Treaty of Doak's Stand (Note: Also known as the Treaty with the Choctaw.)	The Choctaw agree to surrender one-third of their land to the United States.
1821	Treaty of Córdoba	Mexico becomes independent from Spain.
1821	Treaty of Chicago	The Odawa, Ojibwe, and Potawatomi tribes cede to the United States all lands in the Michigan Territory south of the Grand River.
1821	Treaty of Indian Springs (1821)	Creek Indians cede land to the state of Georgia in return for cash payments totaling $200,000 over a period of 14 years.
1822	Capitulation of Quito	Set forth conditions for the withdrawal of the Spanish royalist forces from the territories of the Real Audiencia de Quito after the Battle of Pichincha.
1823	Treaty of Moultrie Creek	Between the United States and the Creek people.
1824	Second Anglo-Dutch Treaty	Settles disputes between the United Kingdom and the Netherlands, dividing the Malay World.
1824	Russo-American Treaty of 1824 (Note: Also known as the Convention Between the United States of America and His Majesty the Emperor of All the Russias, Relative to Navigating, Fishing, Etc., in the Pacific Ocean.)	The United States and Russia fix the southern limit of Russian America at 54°40' N.
1824	Anderson–Gual Treaty	First bilateral U.S. treaty with another country of the Americas.
1825	Treaty of Rio de Janeiro (1825)	The Kingdom of Portugal recognized the independence of the Empire of Brazil.
1825	Osage Treaty (1825) (Note: Also known as the Treaty with the Osage.)	The Osage Nation cedes territories to the United States within and west of Missouri and the Arkansas Territory.
1825	Treaty of St. Louis (1825)	The Shawnee Indians cede the area of Cape Girardeau in Missouri to the United States.
1825	Treaty of Hanover (1825)	Ends the War of German Dissolution.
1825	Treaty of Indian Springs (1825)	Relocates the Creek Indians in Georgia (except the Tokaubatchee) to a parcel of land along the Arkansas River.
1825	First Treaty of Prairie du Chien	Between the United States and representatives of the Sioux, Sac and Fox, Menominee, Ioway, Winnebago and Anishinaabeg tribes.
1825	Treaty of Saint Petersburg (1825)	Also known as the Anglo-Russian Treaty of 1825. Great Britain and Russia fix the southern limit of Russian America at 54°40' N, and roughly outline the land boundary between the two Powers northwards from there.
1825	United States–Central America Treaty	Between the United States and the Federal Republic of Central America.
1826	Akkerman Convention	Forces the Ottomans to retreat from Moldavia and Wallachia; grants autonomy to the Principality of Serbia.
1826	Treaty of Mississinewas (Note: Also known as the Treaty of Mississinewa.)	Between the United States and the Miami tribe.
1826	Treaty of Yandaboo	Ends the First Burmese War.
1826	Burney Treaty	British acknowledge Siamese claim over the four northern Malay states of Kedah, Kelantan, Perlis and Terengganu.
1827	Treaty of London (1827)	Alliance between the United Kingdom, France and Russia to end Turkish action in Greece.
1828	Treaty of Turkmenchay	Persia cedes northern territories to Russia, ending the Russo-Persian War, 1826–1828.
1828	Treaty of Montevideo (1828)	Brazil and Argentina recognize the independence of Uruguay.
1828	Treaty of Limits (Mexico–United States)	Between Mexico and the United States, confirming their shared border as agreed to by Spain and the U.S. in the Adams–Onís Treaty.
1829	London Protocol (1829)	Formulates the boundaries of modern Greece.
1829	Treaty of Edirne	The Ottoman Empire cedes to Russia the right to protect Greece and control the mouth of the Danube River.
1829	Second Treaty of Prairie du Chien	Between the United States and representatives of the Council of Three Fires.
1829	Third Treaty of Prairie du Chien	Between the United States and the Winnebago.
1830	London Protocol (1830)	Confirms sovereignty of Greece.
1830	Treaty of Dancing Rabbit Creek	The United States grants rights to the Choctaw Indians.
1830	Fourth Treaty of Prairie du Chien	Between the United States and the Sac and Fox, the Mdewakanton, Wahpekute, Wahpeton and Sisiton Sioux, Omaha, Ioway, Otoe and Missouria tribes.
1831	Treaty of the Eighteen Articles	An attempt to establish Belgium's borders.
1831	Pacto Federal	Establishes a military alliance between the Argentine provinces of Buenos Aires, Entre Ríos, and Santa Fe.
1832	Treaty of Cusseta	Between the United States and the Creek Indians.
1832	Treaty of Pontotoc Creek	Between the United States and the Chickasaws leading to their removal to present-day Oklahoma.
1832	Treaty of Constantinople (1832)	Officially ends the Greek War of Independence and establishes the borders of modern Greece.
1832	London Protocol (1832)	Reiterates and ratifies the terms of the Treaty of Constantinople (1832).
1833	Treaty of Hünkâr İskelesi	The Ottoman Empire grants Russia free passage through the Bosporus.
1833	Convention of Kütahya	Between the Ottoman Empire and its vassal Muhammad Ali of Egypt, granting Muhammad Ali extra privileges.
1833	Treaty of Chicago	Native American tribes cede lands west of Lake Michigan to the United States in exchange for a reservation of equal size further to the west on the Missouri River; proclaimed in 1835.
1833	Treaty of Zonhoven	Establishes special regulations over the use of the Meuse River by the Netherlands and Belgium.
1834	Treaty of Desmichels	France acknowledges Abd-el-Kader as Bey of Mascara and independent sovereign ruler of Oran in Algeria.
1835	Treaty of New Echota	Between a faction of the Cherokee Indians and the United States, ceding all Cherokee lands in Georgia and for all Georgia Cherokees to relocate to the Indian Territory.
1835	Batman's Treaty	Between John Batman and a group of Wurundjeri elders for the sale of land around Port Phillip, Australia.
1836	Treaties of Velasco	Between Mexico and the Republic of Texas, establishing the independence of Texas.
1836	Treaty of Washington (1836)	The Odawa and Ojibwe Indians cede parts of northern Michigan to the United States.
1837	Munich Coinage Treaty	Unification of currency by six south German states.
1837	Treaty of Tafna	Ends conflict between French and Algerian forces; France cedes territories to Abd-el-Kader.
1838	Treaty of Balta Liman	Commercial treaty between the Ottoman Empire and the Great Britain.
1838	Second Treaty of Buffalo Creek	Between the Seneca tribe of Western New York and certain purchasers of rights to the Indians' land.
1838	Dresden Coinage Convention	Currency treaty between the states of the Zollverein.
1839	Edict of Toleration (Hawaii)	King Kamehameha III establishes the Roman Catholic Diocese of Honolulu.
1839	Treaty of London (1839) (Note: Also known as the Convention of 1839.)	Guarantees the neutrality of Belgium.
1840	Treaty of Waitangi	Between Great Britain and the Maori of New Zealand, which becomes a British colony.
1841	Treaty for the Suppression of the African Slave Trade	First multilateral treaty to suppress the slave trade, signed by Austria, Britain, France, Prussia and Russia.
1842	Treaty of Nanjing	Ends the First Opium War between Great Britain and China; China cedes Hong Kong Island to Britain.
1842	Webster–Ashburton Treaty	Settles boundary disputes between the United States and Canada.
1842	Third Treaty of Buffalo Creek	Between the US and Seneca Indians.
1843	Treaty of Maastricht (1843)	Establishes borders between Belgium and the Netherlands.
1844	Treaty of Tangiers	Ends First Franco-Moroccan War.
1844	Treaty of Tehuacana Creek (Note: Also known as the Treaty of Peace, Friendship and Commerce)	Establishes peace between the Republic of Texas and various Native American tribes.
1844	Treaty of Wanghia (Note: Also known as the Treaty of Wangxia, Sino-American Treaty of Wanghia and US-China Treaty of Wanghia. Formally known as the Treaty of peace, amity, and commerce, between the United States of America and the Chinese Empire.)	First agreement between the United States of America and the Qing Empire. Establishes five U.S. treaty ports in China with extraterritoriality. The U.S. imposes its first unequal treaty on the dynasty.
1844	Treaty of Whampoa	China grants privileges to France.
1846	Oregon Treaty (Note: Also known as the Treaty with the United Kingdom, in Regard to Limits Westward of the Rocky Mountains, and the Treaty of Washington.)	Establishes the border between the British and American sections of the Oregon Country.
1846	Treaty of Lahore	Ends the First Sikh War between Great Britain and the Sikh Empire.
1846	Treaty of Amritsar	The British East India Company recognizes Gulab Singh Dogra as ruler of Kashmir, India.
1846	Mallarino–Bidlack Treaty (Note: Also known as the Tratado de Paz, Amistad, Navegación y Comercio (Treaty of Peace, Friendship, Navigation and Trade).)	New Granada (today Colombia) and the United States establish diplomatic and commercial relations.
1847	Treaty of Cahuenga	First treaty to end the Mexican–American War.
1848	Treaty of Guadalupe Hidalgo	Second treaty ending the Mexican–American War.
1850	Arana–Southern Treaty	Great Britain ends the blockade of Argentina.
1850	Clayton–Bulwer Treaty	The United States and the Great Britain agree not to colonize Central America.
1850	Punctation of Olmütz	Between Prussia and Austria.
1851	Treaty of Mendota	Between the United States and the Sioux tribes of Minnesota (Mdewakanton and Wahpekute).
1851	Treaty of Fort Laramie (1851)	United States negotiates safe passage for Oregon Trail settlers with Native Americans.
1851	Treaty of Kulja (Note: Also known as the Treaty of Kuldja.)	China and Russia establish commercial relations.
1851	Treaty of Traverse des Sioux	Between the United States and the Sioux Indians of Minnesota.
1852	London Protocol (1852)	Signed after the First War of Schleswig.
1852	Sand River Convention	Regulated the relationship between British government of the Cape Colony and the Boers north of the Orange River in South Africa.
1854	Convention of Kanagawa (Note: Also known as the Kanagawa Treaty.)	Japan is opened to American trade.
1854	Anglo-Japanese Friendship Treaty	Japan is opened to British trade.
1854	Treaty with the Umpqua and Kalapuya	Between the United States and the tribes of Umpqua and Kalapuya in the Oregon Territory.
1854	Treaty of Medicine Creek	The Nisqually, Puyallup, and Squaxin Island tribes, along with six other smaller Native American tribes cede territories to the United States.
1855	Bowring Treaty (Note: Officially known as a Treaty of Friendship and Commerce.)	Between Great Britain and Siam, opening Bangkok to foreign free trade, and guaranteeing Siam's independence.
1855	Treaty of Hellgate	The Bitterroot Salish, Pend d'Oreille, and Kootenai tribes cede territories to the United States.
1855	Treaty of Shimoda	Defines the border between Japan and Russia and opens three Japanese ports to foreign trade.
1855	Treaty of Neah Bay	Between the United States and the Makah people.
1855	Treaty with the Kalapuya, etc.	Between the United States and the tribes of Kalapuya, Molala, Clackamas and others in the Oregon Territory.
1855	Canadian–American Reciprocity Treaty (Note: Also known as the Elgin-Marcy Treaty.)	Trade treaty between the colonies of British North America and the United States.
1855	Point Elliott Treaty	United States government and various Native American tribes of the Puget Sound region in the newly formed Washington Territory.
1855	Point No Point Treaty	Original inhabitants of the Kitsap Peninsula cede ownership of their land in exchange for small reservations in Hood Canal and a payment of 60,000 dollars from the U.S. federal government.
1855	Quinault Treaty	The Quinault and Quileute (including the Hoh) tribes cede territories to the United States government.
1855	Treaty with the Nez Perce	Conducted at Walla Walla, Washington, wherein the United States recognizes the sovereignty and lands of the Nez Perce. Territory becomes part of United States. Ratified 1859.
1855	Treaty with the Confederated Umatilla, Cayuse, and Walla Walla Tribes	Conducted at Walla Walla, Washington, wherein the United States recognizes the sovereignty and lands of the Cayuse, Umatilla, and Walla Walla. Territory becomes part of United States. Ratified 1859.
1855	Treaty with the Yakama Confederated Tribes and Bands	Conducted at Walla Walla, Washington, wherein the United States recognizes the sovereignty and lands of the many and varied bands and tribes making up the Yakama Confederated Tribes and Bands. Territory becomes part of United States. Ratified 1859.
1855	"Buffalo" Treaty	Conducted near Ft. Benton, Montana, at Blackfoot Council wherein several tribal nations east and west of continental divide agreed to peace terms and mutual use of territories while hunting buffalo.
1856	Treaty of Paris (1856) (Note: Also known as the Congress of Paris.)	Ends the Crimean War.
1857	Vienna Monetary Treaty	Monetary Treaty Between the German States
1857	Fourth Treaty of Buffalo Creek	Between the US and Seneca Indians
1858	Treaty of Tientsin	Ends the first phase of the Second Opium War between Great Britain and China.
1858	Treaty of Aigun	Specifies border between Russia and China.
1858	Treaty of Amity and Commerce (United States–Japan) (Note: Also known as the Harris Treaty.)	Japanese treaty ports opened to trade with USA.
1858	1858 Treaty of Amity and Commerce between the Netherlands and Japan	Additional Japanese treaty ports opened to trade with the Netherlands.
1858	Anglo-Japanese Treaty of Amity and Commerce	Japanese treaty ports opened to trade with Great Britain.
1858	Treaty of Amity and Commerce between France and Japan	Japanese treaty ports opened to trade with France.
1859	Treaty of Wyke-Aycinena	Peace treaty between Guatemala and the U.K.
1859	Treaty of Zurich	Franco-Austrian armistice formalizing the Peace of Villafranca.
1860	Cobden–Chevalier Treaty	Establishes free trade between Great Britain and France.
1860	Convention of Peking (Note: Also known as the First Convention of Peking.)	Ends the Second Opium War between Great Britain and China; China cedes Kowloon Peninsula to Great Britain.
1860	Treaty of Peace, Amity and Commerce between Portugal and Japan (1860)	Japanese treaty ports opened to trade with Portugal.
1861	Franco-Monegasque Treaty	Grants sovereignty to Monaco.
1861	Treaty of Amity and Commerce between Prussia and Japan (1861)	Japanese treaty ports opened to trade with Prussia.
1862	Treaty of Commerce and Navigation	Established official trade agreements between the United States and Ottoman Empire.
1862	Convention of Scutari	Montenegro acknowledges Ottoman suzerainty.
1862	Anglo-Belgian Treaty of Commerce and Navigation	Free trade agreement between the United Kingdom and Belgium. First commercial treaty to contain a modern stipulation for withdrawal.
1862	First Treaty of Saigon	Emperor Tự Đức cedes Saigon, the island of Poulo Condor, and three southern provinces (Biên Hòa, Gia Định, and Dinh Tuong) to the French Empire.
1863	Treaty of Hué (1863)	Confirms the First Treaty of Saigon.
1863	Treaty of Ruby Valley (1863)	The Western Shoshone Indians give certain rights in Nevada Territory to the United States.
1863	Treaty on a protectorate between France and Cambodia (1863)	Beginning of a protectorate in Cambodia.
1864	First Geneva Convention (Note: Also known as the Convention for the Amelioration of the Condition of the Wounded in Armies in the Field, 1864.)	Establishes rules for the treatment of battlefield casualties.
1864	Treaty of London (1864)	Great Britain cedes the Ionian Islands to Greece.
1864	Treaty of Vienna (1864)	Ends the Second War of Schleswig between Denmark and Austria/Prussia.
1865	Treaty of the Triple Alliance	Military alliance between Brazil, Argentina and Uruguay against Paraguay.
1865	Red Cross Conventions	Treaty with the United States as signatory to aid the wounded.^{:p. 7}
1866	Peace of Prague (1866)	Ends Austro-Prussian War.
1867	Alaska Purchase	The United States buys Alaska from Russia.
1867	Medicine Lodge Treaty	Negotiations between the United States and Native Americans.
1867	Treaty of London (1867)	An international accord in the aftermath of the Austro-Prussian War and the Luxembourg Crisis.
1868	Burlingame Treaty	Establishes relations between the United States and China.
1868	Treaty of Fort Laramie (1868)	Ends Red Cloud's War.
1868	Bancroft Treaties (Treaty on Naturalization)	The North German Confederation recognizes the legal right of its subjects to become citizens of the United States; the first European government to do so.
1871	Treaty of Frankfurt (1871)	Ends the Franco-Prussian War.
1871	Treaty of Washington (1871)	Settles grievances between the United States and Great Britain.
1871	Treaty 1 (Stone Fort Treaty)	Ojibwe and Swampy Cree Indians of southeastern Manitoba accept the sovereignty of Canada.
1871	Treaty 2 (Manitoba Post Treaty)	Ojibwe Indians of southwestern Manitoba accept the sovereignty of Canada.
1873	Iron Rhine Treaty	Regulates the passage of a railway line from Antwerp (in Belgium) to Mönchengladbach (in Germany) over Dutch territory in Limburg.
1873	Treaty 3 (Northwest Angle Treaty)	Ojibwe Indians of eastern Manitoba and western Ontario accept the sovereignty of Canada.
1874	Pangkor Treaty of 1874	Perak becomes the first Malay state to accept British Resident.
1874	Treaty of Berne	Universal Postal Union becomes the second oldest international organization.^{: p. 29}
1874	Second Treaty of Saigon	Reiterates the Treaty of Saigon (1862); the Red River (Song Hong) opens for trade, as well as the ports of Hanoi, Haiphong and Qui Nonh.
1874	Treaty 4 (Qu'appelle Treaty)	Cree and Saulteaux Indians of southern Saskatchewan accept the sovereignty of Canada.
1875	Treaty of Saint Petersburg (1875)	In exchange for the Kuril Islands, Japan relinquishes claims on Sakhalin.
1875	Convention du Mètre (Note: Also known as the Meter Convention and the Treaty of the Meter.)	An international treaty that establishes three organizations to oversee the keeping of metric standards.
1875	Reciprocity Treaty of 1875	A free trade agreement between the United States and the Hawaiian Kingdom.
1875	Treaty 5	Saulteaux and Swampy Cree Indians, and Michel Band métis of Manitoba accept the sovereignty of Canada.
1876	Japan–Korea Treaty of 1876 (Note: Also known as the Nitchō-shūkōjōki or Treaty of Ganghwa.)	First Unequal treaty of Korean Joseon dynasty.
1876	Treaty 6	Plain and Wood Cree and Assiniboine Indians of central Alberta and Saskatchewan accept the sovereignty of Canada.
1877	London Protocol (1877)	Great Britain agrees to remain neutral in any conflict between the Ottoman Empire and Russia.
1877	Treaty 7	Blackfoot, Nakota, and Sarcee Indians of Alberta accept the sovereignty of Canada.
1878	Cyprus Convention	The Ottoman Empire cedes Cyprus to Great Britain in return for military support against Russia
1878	Pact of Zanjón	Ends the Cuban Ten Years' War.
1878	Treaty of San Stefano	Ends the Russo-Turkish War (1877–78) between Russia and the Ottoman Empire.
1878	Treaty of Berlin (1878)	Amends the Treaty of San Stefano.
1879	Treaty of Gandamak	Ends the first phase of the Second Anglo-Afghan War.
1881	Boundary treaty of 1881 between Chile and Argentina	Chile and Argentina define their boundary.
1881	Treaty of Akhal	Persia officially recognizes the annexation of Khwarazm by Russia.
1881	Treaty of Bardo (Note: Also known as the Treaty of Al-Qasr as-Sa'id and the Treaty of Kasser Said.)	Tunisia becomes a protectorate of France.
1882	Triple Alliance (1882)	Alliance between Germany, Austria-Hungary and Italy.
1882	Kilmainham Treaty	Between the British government under William Ewart Gladstone and the Irish nationalist leader Charles Stewart Parnell.
1883	Paris Convention for the Protection of Industrial Property	Intellectual property systems (including patents) of any contracting state become accessible to the nationals of other states party to the convention.
1883	Treaty of Ancón	Settles territorial disputes between Peru and Chile.
1883	Treaty of Hué (1883) (Note: Also known as the Treaty of Protectorate.)	Annam cedes protectorate over Annam and Tonkin to France; not confirmed as too harsh.
1884	Treaty of Hué (1884)	Between Annam and France, replacing the Treaty of Hué (1883).
1885	Treaty of Simulambuco	Between Portugal and the Ngoyo Kingdom in the Cabinda enclave north of Angola.
1886	Berne Convention (Note: Also known as the Berne Convention for the Protection of Literary and Artistic Works.)	International agreement about copyright.
1886	Treaty of Bucharest (1886)	Ends war between Serbia and Bulgaria.
1887	Reinsurance Treaty	Between Germany and Russia.
1889	Treaty of Berlin (1889)	The United States, Great Britain, and Germany establish a condominium and recognize the independence of Samoa.
1889	Treaty of Wuchale	Peace treaty between Ethiopia and Italy, subsequently disputed.
1889	Puna de Atacama dispute	Secret treaty between Argentina and Bolivia (see also 1891)
1890	Heligoland–Zanzibar Treaty (Note: Also known as the Anglo-German Agreement of 1890.)	Agreement between the Great Britain and Germany concerning mainly territorial interests in Africa.
1890	Brussels Conference Act of 1890 on Slave Trade and Importation into Africa of Firearms, Ammunition, and Spiritous Liquors	Anti-slavery treaty, also considered the first drug control treaty for its inclusion of non-medical alcohol.
1890	General Act of Berlin	Treaty establishing the neutrality and autonomous government of Samoa.^{:116}
1890	Pan American Union	Treaty between the United States and countries in Latin America. Would later become the Organization of American States.^{:129}
1891	Treaty of Madrid (1891) (Note: Also known as the Madrid Agreement concerning the International Registration of Marks)	Gives France legal protection of the word champagne.
1891	Puna de Atacama dispute	Secret treaty between Chili and Bolivia (see also 1889)
1895	Treaty of The Hague (1895)	Establishes boundaries of British New Guinea.
1895	Treaty of Shimonoseki (Note: Also known as the Treaty of Maguan.)	Ends the First Sino-Japanese War between China and Japan.
1895	Treaty of Friendship, Commerce and Navigation between Brazil and Japan	Establishes diplomatic and commercial relations between Brazil and Japan.
1896	Treaty of Addis Ababa	Abrogates the Treaty of Wuchale, formally ends the First Italo–Ethiopian War, and recognizes Ethiopia as an independent state.
1897	Treaty of Constantinople (1897)	Ends hostilities between the Ottoman Empire and Greece. Greece pays reparations. Crete autonomous under Ottoman suzerainty (Cretan State).
1897	Franco-Ethiopian treaty (1897)	France and Ethiopia the boundary between Ethiopia and French Somaliland.
1898	Treaty of Paris (1898)	Ends the Spanish–American War.
1898	Convention for the Extension of Hong Kong Territory (Note: Also known as the Second Convention of Peking.)	China cedes the New Territories to Great Britain.
1899	Hague Conventions of 1899 and 1907	Attempts to formalize laws of war.
1899	Tripartite Convention (1899)	Divides Samoa between the United States and Germany.
1899	Kiram-Bates Treaty	Treaty of the United States with the Sultanate of Sulu to stay out of the Philippine–American War. Subsequently, betrayed by the Americans after the war, sparking the Moro Rebellion.
1899	Treaty 8	Cree and Chipewyan Indians cede northern British Columbia, Alberta, and Saskatchewan to Canada and accept Canadian sovereignty.

== 1900–1999 ==
Year	Name	Summary
1900	Treaty of Paris	Ends all conflicting claims over Río Muni (Equatorial Guinea).
1900	Treaty of Washington	Seeks to remove any ground of misunderstanding growing out of the interpretation of Article III of the Treaty of Paris (1898) by clarifying specifics of territories relinquished to the United States by Spain.
1900	Convention for the Preservation of Wild Animals, Birds and Fish in Africa	First international agreement on wildlife conservation.
1901	Hay–Pauncefote Treaty	Replaces the Clayton–Bulwer Treaty.
1901	Boxer Protocol (Note: Also known as the Peace Agreement between the Great Powers and China.)	Peace agreement between the Eight-Nation Alliance and China.
1902	Anglo-Japanese Alliance	Treaty of alliance between England and Japan; signed by Lord Lansdowne and Hayashi Tadasu.
1902	Treaty of Vereeniging	Ends the Second Boer War.
1903	Cuban–American Treaty of Relations (1903)	The Republic of Cuba grants the United States the right to lease land in the Guantánamo Bay area.
1903	Hay–Herrán Treaty	The United States attempts to acquire a lease on Panama.
1903	Hay–Herbert Treaty	Between the United Kingdom and the United States on the location of the border between Alaska and Canada.
1903	Hay–Bunau-Varilla Treaty (Note: Also known as the Treaty No Panamanian Signed.)	Establishes the Panama Canal Zone.
1903	Treaty of Petrópolis	Ends tensions between Bolivia and Brazil over the territory of Acre.
1903	Southern African Customs Union Agreement	Creates customs union between British colonies and protectorates in Southern Africa.
1903	International Sanitary Convention	Organized by the French to standardize international quarantine regulations.^{:359}
1904	Treaty of Peace and Friendship (1904)	Fixes borders between Chile and Bolivia.
1904	Treaty of Lhasa	Between Great Britain and Tibet.
1905	Treaty of Portsmouth	Ends the Russo-Japanese War.
1905	Treaty of Björkö	A secret mutual defense accord between the German Empire and Russia.
1905	October Manifesto	Response to Russian Revolution of 1905. Created the Duma but Tsar Nicholas II of Russia disregarded it after the country was stable again and continued his absolute rule.
1905	Taft–Katsura Agreement (Note: Also known as the Taft-Katsura Memorandum.)	Japan and the United States agree on spheres of influence in Asia.
1905	Convention of Karlstad	This treaty dissolves of the union between Norway and Sweden established by the Convention of Moss and Treaty of Kiel in 1814.
1905	Japan–Korea Treaty of 1905	This treaty deprived Korean Empire of its diplomatic sovereignty, in effect making Korea a protectorate of Empire of Japan; void in 1965.
1905	Treaty 9 (James Bay Treaty)	Conducted at Osnaburgh House trade post, on Lake St. Joseph (Albany River), Ontario, Canada, negotiating an agreement between the Canadian monarch, King Edward VII, and First Nations. There were later adhesions to the treaty.
1906	Second Geneva Convention	Specifies the treatment of wounded, sick and shipwrecked members of armed forces at sea.
1906	Treaty 10	Conducted at Île-à-la-Crosse and Lac du Brochet, Saskatchewan, Canada, negotiating an agreement between the Canadian monarch, King Edward VII, and First Nations. There were later adhesions to the treaty in 1907.
1906	Treaty of Limits (Brazil–Netherlands)	Defined international boundary between Brazil and Dutch colony of Surinam
1907	Rome Agreement	Arrangement for the creation at Paris of an Office international d'hygiène publique, signed at Rome on 9 December 1907
1909	Anglo-Siamese Treaty of 1909 (Note: Also known as the Bangkok Treaty of 1909.)	Formally divides northern Malay states between Siam and the British Empire.
1910	Japan–Korea Treaty of 1910	Begins the period of Korea under Japanese rule; declared null and void in 1965.
1910	Brussels Collision Convention	Governs apportionment of legal liability in maritime collision cases.
1911	North Pacific Fur Seal Convention of 1911	First international treaty seeking the management and conservation of wildlife.
1911	Treaty of Daan	Ends the Zaidi insurgency in Yemen in exchange for autonomy within the Ottoman Empire.
1912	First International Opium Convention	The first international drug control treaty.
1912	Huangpu River Conservancy	Amends the agreement of September 27, 1905, between China and the United States governing the use and conservation of the Huangpu River.^{:879}
1913	Treaty of London (1913)	Ends the First Balkan War.
1913	Treaty of Bucharest (1913)	Ends the Second Balkan War.
1913	Treaty of friendship and alliance between the Government of Mongolia and Tibet	Alliance between Mongolia and Tibet.
1913	Treaty of Athens	Peace treaty between Ottoman Empire and Greece. Ottoman Empire acknowledges union of Crete with Greece.
1913	Treaty of Constantinople (1913)	Peace treaty between Ottoman Empire and Bulgaria. Bulgaria acknowledges Ottoman control on Eastern Thrace.
1914	Bryan–Chamorro Treaty	The United States acquires the rights to any canal built in Nicaragua, to build a naval base in the Gulf of Fonseca, and to lease the Great and Little Corn Islands in the Caribbean; ratified in 1916.
1915	Treaty of London (1915) (London Pact)	Italy enters World War I.
1915	Treaty of Kyakhta (1915)	Status of Mongolia
1915	Cleveland Agreement	Statement of intention to form a Republic of Czechoslovakia.
1916	Sykes–Picot Agreement	France and the United Kingdom define spheres of influence in the Middle East.
1916	Treaty of Bucharest (1916)	Alliance between Romania and the Entente.
1917	Agreement of Saint-Jean-de-Maurienne	August 18 – September 26, 1917.
1917	Lansing–Ishii Agreement	Trade treaty between the United States and Japan.
1917	Corfu Declaration	Statement of intention to form a Kingdom of Yugoslavia.
1917	Anglo-French Convention of 1917	A treaty between the United Kingdom and France laying the ground for the Allied intervention in the Russian Civil War against the Bolsheviks and German interests.
1918	Treaty of Brest-Litovsk (Ukraine–Central Powers)	Between the Ukrainian People's Republic and the Central Powers.
1918	Treaty of Brest-Litovsk	Between Russia and the Central Powers; Russia pulls out of World War I.
1918	Treaty of Bucharest (1918)	Between Romania and the Central Powers; never ratified.
1918	Pittsburgh Agreement	Formalization of the creation of Czechoslovakia.
1918	Treaty of Batum	Between the First Republic of Armenia and the Ottoman Empire.
1918	Armistice of Mudros	Ends the Middle-Eastern part of World War I and forces the Ottomans to renounce most of their imperial holdings.
1918	Armistice of Villa Giusti	Between the Kingdom of Italy and Austria-Hungary, ending warfare on Italian Front during World War I.
1918	Armistice with Germany	Between France, Britain, and Germany, ending World War I
1918	Rongbatsa Agreement	Agreement upon borders between India, Nepal, Tibet and China.
1919	Treaty of Saint-Germain-en-Laye (1919)	Dissolution of the Austro-Hungarian Empire.
1919	Treaty of Versailles	Formally ends World War I.
1919	Treaty of Neuilly-sur-Seine	Between Allied Powers and Bulgaria.
1919	Faisal–Weizmann Agreement	Agreement for Arab–Jewish cooperation in the Middle East.
1919	Anglo-Afghan Treaty of 1919 (Treaty of Rawalpindi)	Between the United Kingdom and Afghanistan during the Third Anglo-Afghan War; United Kingdom recognizes Afghanistan's independence; amended in 1921.
1920	Seventh Treaty of Paris	Union of Bessarabia and Romania.
1920	Treaty of Warsaw (1920)	Between the Second Polish Republic and the Ukrainian People's Republic.
1920	Treaty of Brno (1920)	Naturalizes all populaces within the respective language groups of Austria and Czechoslovakia.
1920	Treaty of Rapallo (1920)	Between Italy and the Kingdom of Serbs, Croats and Slovenes (subsequently the Kingdom of Yugoslavia).
1920	Treaty of Moscow (1920)	Mutual recognition of the Russian SFSR and the Democratic Republic of Georgia
1920	Treaty of Tartu (Russian–Finnish)	Establishes border between Russia and Finland.
1920	Treaty of Tartu (Russian–Estonian)	Establishes border between Russia and Estonia.
1920	Treaty of Trianon	Regulates the newly independent Hungary.
1920	Treaty of Sèvres	Peace between the Allies of World War I and the Ottoman Empire.
1920	Latvian–Soviet Peace Treaty	Brings peace between the Republic of Latvia and Russian SFSR.
1920	Treaty of Alexandropol	Ends the war between Turkish nationalists and the Armenian Republic.
1920	Svalbard Treaty (Note: Also known as the Treaty concerning Spitsbergen.)	The Arctic archipelago of Svalbard becomes part of the Kingdom of Norway.
1921	Franco-Polish alliance (1921)	Military alliance between Poland and France that was active between 1921 and 1940.
1921	Anglo-Irish Treaty (Note: Also known as the Articles of Agreement for a Treaty Between Great Britain and Ireland.)	Ends the Irish War of Independence and created the Irish Free State.
1921	Peace of Riga (Note: Also known as the Treaty of Riga.)	Ends the Polish–Soviet War.
1921	Thomson–Urrutia Treaty	Colombia recognizes Panama's independence in return for 25 million dollars.
1921	Treaty of Berlin (1921)	Separate post-World War I peace agreement between the United States and Germany.
1921	Treaty of Kars	Friendship treaty between Turkey and the Soviet governments of the Transcaucasian Republics.
1921	Treaty of Ankara (1921) (Note: Also known as the Accord of Ankara, the Franklin-Bouillon Agreement and the Franco-Turkish Agreement of Ankara.)	France agrees to evacuate Cilicia in return for economic concessions from Turkey; Turkey acknowledges French imperial sovereignty over Syria.
1921	Russo-Persian Treaty of Friendship (1921)	Grants both Iran and the Soviet Union full and equal shipping rights in the Caspian Sea.
1921	Treaty of Moscow (1921)	A friendship treaty between the Grand National Assembly of Turkey (TBMM) and the Bolshevik government of the Russian Soviet Federative Socialist Republic.
1921	Anglo–Afghan Treaty of 1921	Amendments to and expansion of the Anglo-Afghan Treaty of 1919 between the United Kingdom and Afghanistan
1921	Treaty 11	Conducted at Northwest Territories, Canada, negotiating an agreement between the Canadian monarch, King George V, and First Nations. There were further signings in 1921.
1922	Washington Naval Treaty (Note: Also known as the Five-Power Treaty.)	Attempts to limit naval expansion.
1922	Treaty of Rapallo (1922)	Between the Weimar Republic and Bolshevist Russia.
1922	Treaty on the Creation of the USSR	Legalized the creation of a union of several Republics of the Soviet Union in the form of the Union of Soviet Socialist Republics.
1923	Treaty of Lausanne (1923)	Sets the boundaries of modern Turkey.
1923	Halibut Treaty	Canadian-American agreement concerning fishing rights in the northern Pacific Ocean.
1923	Convention and Statute on the International Régime of Maritime Ports	Mandated equal treatment of all ships in maritime ports, regardless of nationality.
1924	Brussels Agreement (1924)	Multilateral treaty providing for medical treatment of seamen with venereal diseases.
1924	Treaty of Rome (1924)	Revokes parts of the Treaty of Rapallo (1920) that created the independent Free State of Fiume; Fiume would be annexed to Italy while the town of Sušak would be assigned to Yugoslavia.
1925	Treaty of Nettuno	Defines border and immigration policy between the Kingdom of Italy and the Kingdom of Yugoslavia.
1925	Locarno Treaties	Seven treaties between the World War I Western European Allied powers and the new states of central and Eastern Europe.
1925	Hague Agreement Concerning the International Deposit of Industrial Designs	Adopted: The Hague – November 6, 1925. Revised in London on June 2, 1934 and on November 28, 1960. Supplemented: Monaco – November 18, 1961. Revisions: Stockholm – July 14, 1967, Geneva – August 29, 1975, Amended: September 28, 1979, Geneva – July 2, 1999
1926	Treaty of Berlin (1926)	Germany and the Soviet Union pledge neutrality.
1926	Treaty of San'a	Italian recognition of Yahya Muhammad Hamid ed-Din as king of Yemen, and Yemeni claims to Aden.
1927	Treaty of Jeddah (1927)	Establishes the independence of present-day Saudi Arabia from the United Kingdom.
1928	Kellogg–Briand Pact (Note: Also known as the Pact of Paris.)	Calls "for the renunciation of war as an instrument of national policy".
1928	Italo-Ethiopian Treaty of 1928	20 year treaty of peace between the Kingdom of Italy and the Empire of Ethiopia.
1929	Lateran Treaty	The Kingdom of Italy and the Vatican City formally recognize each other.
1929	Geneva Convention (1929)	Establishes rules for the treatment of prisoners of war; predecessor of the 1949 Third Geneva Convention.
1929	International Convention for the Suppression of Counterfeiting Currency	Criminalises the counterfeiting of currency.
1930	London Naval Treaty (Note: Also known as the Treaty for the Limitation and Reduction of Naval Armament.)	Regulates submarine warfare and shipbuilding.
1930	Convention Between the United States and Great Britain (1930)	Definitely delimits the boundary between North Borneo (then a British protectorate) and the Philippine archipelago (then a U.S. Territory).
1931	Treaty of Westminster (1931) (Note: Also known as the Statute of Westminster 1931.)	Creates the British Commonwealth.
1932	Soviet–Polish Non-Aggression Pact	International treaty of non-aggression signed by representatives of Poland and the USSR.
1934	German–Polish declaration of non-aggression	International treaty between Nazi Germany and the Second Polish Republic; both countries pledged to settle disputes through bilateral negotiations.
1934	Balkan Pact	Between Greece, Turkey, Romania, and Yugoslavia; signatories agree to suspend all disputed territorial claims against each other.
1935	Franco-Soviet Treaty of Mutual Assistance	Bilateral pact between France and the USSR with the aim of containing German aggression.
1935	Treaty of Establishment, Commerce and Navigation (Note: Also known as the Treaty of Establishment, Commerce and Navigation with Full Protocols and Annex.)	Reinforces the Russo-Persian Treaty of Friendship.
1936	Anglo-Egyptian Treaty of 1936	The United Kingdom withdraws its troops from Egypt except those necessary to protect the Suez Canal and its surroundings.
1936	Franco-Syrian Treaty of Independence (1936)	France provides independence to Syria.
1936	Montreux Convention Regarding the Regime of the Straits	Approve Turkish control on Bosphorus and Dardanelles Straits
1937	International Convention for the Regulation of Whaling	Establishes limitations on whaling practices; protocols signed in 1938 and again in 1945.
1937	Treaty of Saadabad (Note: Also known as the Saadabad Pact.)	A non-aggression pact signed by Turkey, Iran, Iraq and Afghanistan.
1938	Munich Agreement	Surrenders the Sudetenland to Germany.
1939	Molotov–Ribbentrop Pact (Note: Also known as the Hitler–Stalin Pact, the German–Soviet Nonaggression Pact, the or Nazi–Soviet Pact and formally as the Treaty of Nonaggression between Germany and the Union of Soviet Socialist Republics.)	Soviet-German non-aggression pact.
1939	Pact of Steel	Pact of Friendship and Alliance between Germany and Italy.
1940	Moscow Peace Treaty	Ends the Winter War.
1940	Treaty of Commerce and Navigation	Reinforces the Treaty of Establishment, Commerce and Navigation between Iran and the Soviet Union.
1940	Tripartite Pact	Axis Powers of Second World War are formed
1940	Treaty of Craiova	Romania cedes territories to Bulgaria.
1941	Tokyo Convention	Ends the Franco-Thai War.
1942	Anglo-Soviet Treaty of 1942	Twenty-year mutual assistance agreement between the United Kingdom and the USSR that establishes both a military and political alliance.
1944	Bretton Woods Agreement	Establishes rules for commercial and financial relations among the major industrial states.
1944	Tito–Šubašić Agreement (Note: Also known as the Treaty of Vis.)	Attempts to merge Yugoslavian governments.
1944	Chicago Convention on International Civil Aviation	Establishes the International Civil Aviation Organization; ratified in 1947.
1944	London Protocol (1944)	Prepares for the division of Germany into three occupation zones.
1945	Treaty of Varkiza (Note: Also known as the Varkiza Pact and the Varkiza Peace Agreement.)	Attempts to officially end the Greek Civil War.
1945	United Nations Charter	Establishes the United Nations.
1945	Wanfried Agreement	Transfers three Hessian villages to the Soviet Union and two Eichsfeld villages to the United States.
1946	Bermuda Agreement	Bilateral agreement on civil aviation between the United States and United Kingdom.
1946	Keflavik Agreement	Between the US and Iceland
1946	Gruber–De Gasperi Agreement	South Tyrol and Trentino remain part of Italy, but ensures their autonomy as region of Trentino-Alto Adige/Südtirol.
1946	International Convention for the Regulation of Whaling	Replaces the International Agreement for the Regulation of Whaling; governs the commercial, scientific, and aboriginal subsistence whaling practices of fifty-nine member nations.
1946	1946 Lake Success Protocol (Note: Also known formally as the Protocol Amending the Agreements, Conventions and Protocols on Narcotic Drugs concluded at The Hague on 23 January 1912, at Geneva on 11 February 1925 and 19 February 1925, and 13 July 1931, at Bangkok on 27 November 1931 and at Geneva on 26 June 1936.)	Shifts drug control functions previously assigned to the League of Nations to the United Nations.
1946	Treaty of Manila (1946) (Note: Also known as the Treaty of General Relations Between The United States Of America And The Republic Of The Philippines (archived from the original on 2009-03-26).)	The United States recognizes the independence of the Republic of the Philippines.
1946	Treaty of London (1946)	Great Britain recognizes the independence of Transjordan.
1947	General Agreement on Tariffs and Trade (Note: Also known, in abbreviated form, as GATT.)	Establishes international trade rules.
1947	Paris Peace Treaties, 1947	Formally ends World War II in the European Theatre.
1947	Inter-American Treaty of Reciprocal Assistance (Note: Also known as the Rio Treaty and Rio Pact.)	A "hemispheric defense" doctrine signed by many nations in the Americas.
1947	United Nations Education, Scientific and Cultural Organization	Establishes the department of the United Nations that deals with Education, Science, and Culture.
1949	North Atlantic Treaty (Note: Also known as the Treaty of Washington.)	Establishes NATO, the North Atlantic Treaty Organization.
1949	Fourth Geneva Convention (Note: Also known as GCIV.)	Establishes rules for the protection of civilians during wartime.
1949	Treaty of The Hague (1949)	The Netherlands grants independence to Indonesia except for the South Molucca Islands and West Irian.
1949	Treaty of London (1949)	Creates the Council of Europe.
1950	Liaquat–Nehru Pact	Between Pakistani Prime Minister Liaquat Ali Khan and Indian Prime Minister Jawaharlal Nehru, India.
1950	Treaty of Zgorzelec (Note: Also known formally as the Treaty between the Republic of Poland and the German Democratic Republic concerning the demarcation of the established and existing Polish-German state border.)	Establishes borders between the Republic of Poland and the German Democratic Republic.
1951	Mutual Defense Treaty (U.S.–Philippines)	A mutual defense accord between the Philippines and the United States.
1951	Genocide Convention	Defines and outlaws genocide.
1951	Treaty of San Francisco (Note: Also known as San Francisco Peace Treaty and the Treaty of Peace with Japan.)	Formally ends the war between the Allies of World War II and Japan.
1951	Security Treaty Between the United States and Japan	A mutual defense agreement between the United States and Japan; went into effect on April 28, 1952.
1951	U.S. and Japan Mutual Defense Assistance Agreement	Permits U.S. armed forces to station troops in Japan while encouraging Japan to rearm for defensive purposes only; went into effect on May 1, 1954.
1952	ANZUS Treaty (Note: Also known as the Australia, New Zealand, United States Security Treaty.)	Alliance between Australia, New Zealand and the United States.
1952	Treaty of Taipei (Note: Also known as the Sino-Japanese Peace Treaty.)	Peace treaty between Japan and the Republic of China.
1952	General Treaty (Note: Also known as the Deutschlandvertrag.)	Treaty between the Federal Republic of Germany and the Western Allies (France, UK, USA) restoring (limited) German sovereignty.
1952	International Convention relating to Arrest of Sea-going Ships	Standardises rules relating to arrest of ships in port.
1953	Korean War Armistice Agreement	Ended the fighting between the United Nations Command and the Korean People's Army & PRC People's Liberation Army.
1954	Central Treaty Organization (Note: Also known, in abbreviated form, as CENTO; original name was the Middle East Treaty Organization or METO; also known as the Baghdad Pact.)	Alliance of Middle Eastern countries and the United Kingdom.
1954	Southeast Asia Collective Defense Treaty (Note: Also known as the Manila Pact.)	Established the Southeast Asia Treaty Organization, (SEATO), a defensive alliance between Australia, France, New Zealand, Pakistan, Philippines, South Korea, South Vietnam, Thailand, the United Kingdom and the United States.
1955	Asian–African Conference (Note: Also known as the Bandung Conference.)	Conference stated to promote Afro-Asian economic and cultural cooperation and to oppose colonialism or neocolonialism by the United States, the Soviet Union, or any other "imperialistic" nation.
1955	Austrian State Treaty (Note: Also known as the Austrian Independence Treaty.)	Re-establishes a free, sovereign and democratic Austria.
1955	Simonstown Agreement	The Royal Navy surrenders its naval base at Simonstown, South Africa and transfers command of the South African Navy to the government of South Africa.
1955	Warsaw Pact (Note: Also known as the Warsaw Treaty and the Treaty of Friendship, Co-operation and Mutual Assistance.)	Alliance of Central and Eastern European communist states.
1956	Soviet–Japanese Joint Declaration of 1956	Reestablishes diplomatic relations between the Soviet Union and Japan following World War II.
1957	Anglo-Malayan Defence Agreement (Note: Also known, in 1963, as the Anglo-Malaysian Defence Agreement.)	Provides a security umbrella for the independent Malaya.
1957	Treaty of Rome (Note: Also known as the Treaty establishing the European Economic Community.)	Establishes the European Economic Community.
1957	International Atomic Energy Treaty	Establishes the International Atomic Energy Agency.
1958	1958 US–UK Mutual Defence Agreement	Bilateral treaty between the United States and the United Kingdom on nuclear weapons cooperation.
1958	Lisbon Agreement for the Protection of Appellations of Origin and their International Registration	Protection of Appellations of Origin and establishment of an International Register of Appellations of Origin, run by the World Intellectual Property Organization.
1958	Convention on the Territorial Sea and the Contiguous Zone	Provides new universal legal controls for the management of marine natural resources and the control of pollution.
1959	Antarctic Treaty System (Note: Also known, in abbreviated form, as ATS.)	Sets aside Antarctica as a scientific preserve, establishes freedom of scientific investigation and bans military activity on the continent; came into force in 1961.
1960	Treaty of Mutual Cooperation and Security between the United States and Japan	Strengthens Japan's ties to the "West" during the Cold War era.
1960	The Indus Waters Treaty 1960	Water sharing treaty between India and Pakistan.
1960	1960 Treaty of Montevideo	Establishes the Latin American Free Trade Association.
1960	London and Zurich Agreements	Between United Kingdom, Turkey and Greece about the independence and Guarantee of Cyprus.
1961	Arms Control and Disarmament Agency	Strengthens U.S. national security by implementing effective policies of arms control and disarmament.
1961	Apostille Convention	International treaty drafted by the Hague Conference on Private International Law. It specifies the modalities through which a document issued in one of the signatory countries can be certified for legal purposes in all the other signatory states. Such a certification is called an apostille (French: certification). The apostille is an international certification. The treaty is also officially known as the Hague Convention Abolishing the Requirement of Legalisation for Foreign Public Documents.
1961	Columbia River Treaty	International agreement between Canada and the United States on the development and operation of the upper Columbia River basin.
1961	Vienna Convention on Diplomatic Relations	International treaty on diplomatic intercourse and the privileges and immunities of diplomatic missions; came into force in 1964.
1961	Alliance for Progress	U.S. President Dwight D. Eisenhower attempts to establish economic cooperation between North America and South America.
1961	Single Convention on Narcotic Drugs	International treaty regulating the manufacture and use for medical purposes, and banning the trafficking of narcotic drugs.
1961	Convention on the Reduction of Statelessness	International treaty against statelessness; went into effect on December 13, 1975.
1961	Rome Convention for the Protection of Performers, Producers of Phonograms and Broadcasting Organisations	Adopted on October 26, 1961. The Rome Convention secures protection in performances for performers, in phonograms for producers of phonograms and in broadcasts for broadcasting organizations.
1962	Nassau Agreement	The United States provides the United Kingdom with nuclear-armed Polaris missiles in return for a nuclear submarine base in the Holy Loch, near Glasgow.
1962	New York Agreement	Agreement between the Republic of Indonesia and the Kingdom of the Netherlands Concerning West New Guinea (West Irian). Transferred responsibility for a territory to the United Nations and arranged for subsequent administration by Indonesia pending an act of self-determination defined in agreement.
1962	Sino–North Korean Border Treaty	Border treaty made in secret between the People's Republic of China and North Korea that, in combination with a subsequent 1963 treaty, defines the modern border between the two countries.
1963	Vienna Convention on Consular Relations	Multilateral treaty that codifies consular practices.
1963	Vienna Convention on Civil Liability for Nuclear Damage	Sets rules of liability for any and all forms of nuclear damage.
1963	Partial Nuclear Test Ban Treaty (Note: Also known as the Limited Test Ban Treaty, the Nuclear Test Ban Treaty and the Treaty Banning Nuclear Weapon Tests In The Atmosphere, In Outer Space And Under Water.)	Prohibiting all test detonations of nuclear weapons except underground.
1963	Élysée Treaty (Note: Also known as the Franco-German Partnership.)	Franco-German agreement for joint cooperation in foreign policy, economic and military integration, and exchange of student education.
1963	Strasbourg Convention (Note: Also known as the Strasbourg Patent Convention and the Convention on the Unification of Certain Points of Substantive Law on Patents for Invention.)	Harmonizes patent laws across European countries.
1965	Merger Treaty	Organizes the European Coal and Steel Community, the European Economic Community and Euratom; creates European Commission and the Council of the European Communities; came into force on July 1, 1967.
1965	Treaty on Basic Relations between Japan and the Republic of Korea	Established basic relationship between Japan and the Republic of Korea (South Korea).
1967	Treaty of Tlatelolco (Note: Also known as the Treaty for the Prohibition of Nuclear Weapons in Latin America and the Caribbean.)	Keeps Latin American and the Caribbean regions free of nuclear weapons.
1967	ASEAN Declaration (Note: Also known as the Bangkok Declaration.)	Founding document of the Association of Southeast Asian Nations.
1967	WIPO Convention (Note: Also known as the Convention Establishing the World Intellectual Property Organization.)	Established the World Intellectual Property Organization.
1967	Outer Space Treaty (Note: Also known as the Treaty on Principles Governing the Activities of States in the Exploration and Use of Outer Space, including the Moon and Other Celestial Bodies.)	Forbids the placing of nuclear weapons or any other weapons of mass destruction on celestial bodies and into outer space in general.
1968	Treaty on the Non-Proliferation of Nuclear Weapons (Note: Also known as the Treaty on the Non-Proliferation of Nuclear Weapons.)	Limits the spread of nuclear weapons through non-proliferation, disarmament, and the right to utilize nuclear technology for peaceful purposes.
1969	Convention on the Elimination of All Forms of Racial Discrimination	Commits signatories to the elimination of racial discrimination and the promotion of understanding among all races.
1969	Vienna Convention on the Law of Treaties (Note: Also known, in abbreviated form, as the VCLT.)	Codifies the pre-existing international customary law on treaties with some necessary gap-filling and clarifications.
1969	Arusha Agreement	Establishes better economic relations between the European Community and the nations of Kenya, Uganda, and Tanzania; came into force in 1971.
1970	Hague Hijacking Convention	Criminalises the hijacking of civil aviation aircraft.
1970	Patent Cooperation Treaty (Note: Also known, in abbreviated form, as the PCT.)	Provides a unified procedure for filing patent applications to protect inventions internationally; came into force in 1978; amended in 1979; modified in 1984 and 2001.
1970	Boundary Treaty of 1970	Settles boundary disputes between the United States and Mexico.
1970	Treaty of Warsaw (1970)	West Germany and the People's Republic of Poland pledge themselves to nonviolence and accept the Oder–Neisse line; ratified in 1972.
1971	Convention on Psychotropic Substances	Attempts to control psychoactive drugs such as amphetamines, barbiturates, and LSD.
1971	Five Power Defence Arrangements (Note: Also known, in abbreviated form, as the FPDA.)	Security agreement between Australia, Malaysia, New Zealand, Singapore and the United Kingdom.
1971	Ramsar Convention	Focuses on the conservation and sustainable utilization of wetlands; went into effect in 1975.
1971	IPC Agreement (Note: Also known as the Strasbourg Agreement Concerning the International Patent Classification.)	Establishes a common classification for patents for invention, inventors' certificates, utility models and utility certificates; went into effect in 1975; amended in 1979.
1971	Seabed Arms Control Treaty (Note: Also known as the Seabed Treaty.)	Bans the placement of nuclear weapons on the ocean floor beyond a 12-mile (19 km) coastal zone; came into force in 1972.
1971	Convention for the Suppression of Unlawful Acts against the Safety of Civil Aviation	Criminalises sabotage of civil aircraft and dangerous acts on board aircraft
1971	Indo-Soviet Treaty of Friendship and Cooperation	Specifies strategic cooperation between India and the Soviet Union.
1971	Geneva Phonograms Convention	Convention for the Protection of Producers of Phonograms Against Unauthorized Duplication of Their Phonograms; adopted in Geneva in October 1971.
1971	Strasbourg Agreement Concerning the International Patent Classification	Adopted: Strasbourg – March 24, 1971. Amended: September 28, 1979.
1972	Addis Ababa Agreement (1972)	A series of accords between the government of Sudan and insurgents in Southern Sudan, which ended the First Sudanese Civil War
1972	Anti-Ballistic Missile Treaty (Note: Also known as the ABM Treaty or ABMT.)	Limits the use of anti-ballistic missile (ABM) systems in defending areas against missile-delivered nuclear weapons (US PL 92-448).
1972	Basic Treaty (1972) (Note: Also known as the Treaty concerning the basis of relations between the Federal Republic of Germany and the German Democratic Republic.)	Establishes relations between the Federal Republic of Germany and the German Democratic Republic; came into effect in 1973.
1972	Biological Weapons Convention (Note: Also known as the Convention on the Prohibition of the Development, Production and Stockpiling of Bacteriological (Biological) and Toxin Weapons and on their Destruction.)	First multilateral disarmament treaty banning the production of an entire category of biological weapons (with exceptions for medical and defensive purposes in small quantities).
1972	Convention for the Conservation of Antarctic Seals	Provides protection for Antarctic seals; came into effect in 1978.
1972	London Convention on the Prevention of Marine Pollution by Dumping of Wastes and Other Matter	Attempts to control pollution of the sea via deliberate dumping by vessels, aircraft, and platforms.
1972	Sino-Japanese Joint Communiqué (Note: Also known formally as the Joint Communiqué of the Government of Japan and the Government of the People's Republic of China.)	Japan recognizes PRC as the sole legal Government of China; and China renounces its demand for war reparation from Japan
1972	Simla Agreement (Note: Also known as the Simla Pact and the Simla Treaty.)	Normalised relations between India and Pakistan following the Bangladesh Liberation War.
1973	European Patent Convention (Note: Also known as the Convention on the Grant of European Patents.)	Multilateral treaty instituting the European Patent Organisation.
1973	Agreement on the Transfer of Corpses	Establishes rules and standards for the transfer of human corpses across international borders
1973	CITES – The Convention on International Trade in Endangered Species of Wild Fauna and Flora	Also known as the Washington Convention; Regulates international trade of endangered species of animals and plants (live specimens, as well as their parts and derivatives)
1973	Treaty of Chaguaramas	Establishes the Caribbean Community (CARICOM) signed by Barbados, Trinidad and Tobago, Guyana, and Jamaica and replaces the previous Caribbean Free Trade Association in 1974.
1973	Paris Peace Accords	Formalized American withdrawal from Vietnam.
1973	Vientiane Treaty	A cease-fire agreement between the monarchial government of Laos and the communist Pathet Lao.
1973	Agreement on the Transfer of Corpses	Establishes rules and standards for the transport of human corpses across international borders. Intended to replace a similar 1937 treaty.
1973	Sunningdale Agreement	Established a power-sharing Northern Ireland Executive under Brian Faulkner of the UUP and Gerry Fitt of the SDLP.
1974	Japan–Australia Migratory Bird Agreement (Note: Also known, in abbreviated form, as JAMBA.)	Treaty between Australia and Japan to minimise harm to the major areas used by birds that migrate between the two countries; came into force in 1981.
1974	Threshold Test Ban Treaty (Note: Also known as the Treaty on the Limitation of Underground Nuclear Weapon Tests.)	Establishes a nuclear "threshold" by prohibiting nuclear tests of devices having a yield exceeding 150 kilotons.
1974	Brussels Convention Relating to the Distribution of Programme-Carrying Signals Transmitted by Satellite	The Brussels or Satellites Convention provides for the obligation of each Contracting State to take adequate measures to prevent the unauthorized distribution on or from its territory of any programme-carrying signal transmitted by satellite.
1975	Treaty of Osimo	Divides the Free Territory of Trieste between Italy and Yugoslavia.
1975	Treaty of Lagos	Establishes the Economic Community of West African States.
1976	Environmental Modification Convention (Note: Also known as the Convention on the Prohibition of Military or Any Other Hostile Use of Environmental Modification Techniques.)	Prohibits the military or other hostile use of environmental modification techniques; came into force in 1978.
1976	Treaty of Amity and Cooperation in Southeast Asia	Treaty signed among the founding members of ASEAN and acceded to by all ASEAN members and 15 non-members.
1976	Convention on Limitation of Liability for Maritime Claims	Admiralty law treaty regarding liability for maritime claims.
1977	Budapest Treaty on the International Recognition of the Deposit of Microorganisms for the Purposes of Patent Procedure	Adopted in 1977, the Budapest Treaty concerns a specific topic in the international patent process: microorganisms.
1977	Torrijos–Carter Treaties	Abrogates the Hay–Bunau-Varilla Treaty and guarantees Panama its eventual control of the Panama Canal after 1999.
1978	Camp David Accords	Agreement between Egypt and Israel.
1978	Treaty of Peace and Friendship between Japan and the People's Republic of China	Peace agreement between Japan and the People's Republic of China.
1979	Egypt–Israel peace treaty	Israel and Egypt agree to mutually recognize each other; Israel agrees to withdraw its troops from the Sinai Peninsula in return for Israeli ships to gain free passage through the Suez Canal.
1979	Moon Treaty (Note: Also known as the Agreement Governing the Activities of States on the Moon and Other Celestial Bodies or the Moon Agreement.)	Turns jurisdiction of all heavenly bodies to the international community; went into effect in 1984.
1979	Treaty of Accession 1979	The accession of Greece to the European Union.
1979	Treaty of Montevideo	Both Argentina and Chile pledge to a peaceful solution to their border disputes at the Beagle Channel.
1981	Nairobi Treaty on the Protection of the Olympic Symbol	All parties to the Nairobi Treaty are under the obligation to protect the Olympic symbol against commercial use (in advertisements, on goods, as a mark, etc.) without the authorization of the International Olympic Committee.
1983	Australia New Zealand Closer Economic Relations Trade Agreement (Note: Also known, in its abbreviated form, as ANZCERTA.)	A free trade agreement between the governments of New Zealand and Australia.
1984	Sino-British Joint Declaration (Note: Also known formally as the Joint Declaration of the Government of the United Kingdom of Great Britain and Northern Ireland and the Government of the People's Republic of China on the Question of Hong Kong.)	The United Kingdom relinquishes Hong Kong to the People's Republic of China.
1984	Nkomati Accord	Nonagression treaty between Mozambique and the Republic of South Africa.
1984	Oujda Treaty	Morocco and Libya establish the Arabic–African Union.
1984	Treaty of Peace and Friendship of 1984 between Chile and Argentina	Resolves disputes between Argentina and Chile over the possession of the Picton, Lennox and Nueva islands.
1985	Plaza Accord	The Group of Five agree to devalue the US dollar in relation to the Japanese yen and German Deutsche Mark by intervening in currency markets.
1985	Schengen Agreement	Establishes for the European Community a border system and a common policy on the temporary entry of persons.
1985	1985 Helsinki Protocol on the Reduction of Sulphur Emissions (Note: Also known as the Protocol to the 1979 Convention on Long-Range Transboundary Air Pollution on the Reduction of Sulphur Emissions or Their Transboundary Fluxes by at Least 30%.)	Provides for a 30% reduction in sulphur emissions and their transboundary fluxes by 1993; came into effect in 1987.
1985	Treaty of Rarotonga (Note: Also known as the South Pacific Nuclear Free Zone Treaty.)	Formalizes a nuclear-weapon-free zone in the South Pacific.
1986	China–Australia Migratory Bird Agreement	Treaty between Australia and China to minimise harm to major areas used by birds that migrate between the two countries; came into force in 1988.
1986	Convention on Early Notification of a Nuclear Accident	In the wake of the Chernobyl disaster, states agree to promptly notify each other and the IAEA of nuclear accidents that occur.
1987	Intermediate-Range Nuclear Forces Treaty	Eliminates nuclear and conventional ground-launched ballistic and cruise missiles with ranges of 500 to 5,500 kilometers (310 to 3,420 miles); ratified and came into force in 1988.
1987	Joint Declaration on the Question of Macau (Note: Also known formally as the Joint Declaration of the Government of the People's Republic of China and the Government of the Republic of Portugal on the question of Macao.)	Portugal relinquishes Macau to the People's Republic of China.
1988	Nitrogen Oxide Protocol (Note: Also known as the Protocol to the 1979 Convention on Long-Range Transboundary Air Pollution Concerning the Control of Emissions of Nitrogen Oxides or Their Transboundary Fluxes.)	Provides for the control or reduction of nitrogen oxides and their transboundary fluxes; came into effect in 1991.
1988	United Nations Convention Against Illicit Traffic in Narcotic Drugs and Psychotropic Substances	Enforcing the 1961 Single Convention on Narcotic Drugs and the 1971 Convention on Psychotropic Substances.
1988	Convention for the Suppression of Unlawful Acts against the Safety of Maritime Navigation	Criminalises hijacking and other dangerous acts on ships.
1988	Protocol for the Suppression of Unlawful Acts of Violence at Airports serving International Civil Aviation	Protocol to the Convention for the Suppression of Unlawful Acts against the Safety of Civil Aviation, criminalises dangerous or violent acts in airports
1989	Montreal Protocol (Note: Also known as the Montreal Protocol on Substances that Deplete the Ozone Layer.)	Attempts to protect the ozone layer by phasing out the production of a number of substances believed to be responsible for ozone depletion.
1989	Treaty on Conventional Armed Forces in Europe (Note: Also known, in its abbreviated form, as the CFE.)	Establishes limits on key categories of conventional military equipment in Europe and mandates the destruction of excess weaponry.
1989	Timor Gap Treaty	Between the governments of Australia and Indonesia; rewritten in 2001.
1989	Wellington Convention	Prohibits the use of fishing driftnets in the South Pacific that are longer than 2.5 metres.
1989	Washington Treaty	Adopted in Washington on May 26, 1989
1990	Malaysia–Singapore Points of Agreement of 1990	Treaty regarding the future of railway land owned by the Malaysian government through Malayan Railways in Singapore.
1990	1990 Chemical Weapons Accord	On June 1, 1990, Presidents George H. W. Bush and Mikhail Gorbachev sign the bilateral U.S.-Soviet Chemical Weapons Accord.
1990	Treaty on the Final Settlement with Respect to Germany	The Four Powers renounce all rights they formerly held in Germany and Germany renounces all claims to territories east of the Oder–Neisse line.
1991	Brioni Agreement	Ends ten-day war in Slovenia.
1991	Abuja Treaty	International agreement that creates the African Economic Community.
1991	Treaty of Asunción	International treaty signed between Argentina, Brazil, Uruguay and Paraguay, served as the basis for the establishment of the Mercosur trade bloc.
1991	Belavezha Accords	Agreement which declared the Soviet Union effectively dissolved and established the Commonwealth of Independent States in its place.
1992	Maastricht Treaty (Note: Also known formally as the Treaty on European Union.)	Establishes the European Union.
1992	United Nations Framework Convention on Climate Change (Note: Also known, in its abbreviated forms, as the UNFCCC or the FCCC.)	Attempts to reduce emissions of greenhouse gasses in order to combat global warming.
1992	Convention on Biological Diversity (CBD)	Conservation of biological diversity (or biodiversity), sustainable use of its components, and a fair and equitable sharing of benefits arising from genetic resources.
1992	Treaty on Open Skies	Establishes an international program of unarmed aerial surveillance flights over all participants' territories.
1992	CIS Collective Security Treaty	Armenia, Kazakhstan, Kyrgyzstan, Russia, Tajikistan and Uzbekistan establish framework for the Commonwealth of Independent States.
1992	Sochi agreement	Georgian and South Ossetian forces signed a ceasefire to halt the contemporaneously recognized "civil war."
1993	Oslo I Accord (Note: Also known as the Declaration of Principles on Interim Self-Government Arrangements or the Declaration of Principles (DOP).)	Between the Israeli government and the Palestine Liberation Organization.
1993	Chemical Weapons Convention (Note: Also known formally as the Convention on the Prohibition of the Development, Production, Stockpiling and Use of Chemical Weapons and on their Destruction.)	Outlaws the production, stockpiling and use of chemical weapons.
1994	Israel–Jordan peace treaty (Note: Also known formally as the Treaty of Peace Between the State of Israel and the Hashemite Kingdom of Jordan.)	Normalizes relations between Israel and Jordan and resolves territorial disputes between them.
1994	North American Free Trade Agreement (NAFTA)	Free trade agreement between Canada, the United States of America, and Mexico.
1994	Kremlin accords	Stops the preprogrammed aiming of nuclear missiles at targets in any nation and provides for the dismantling of Russian nuclear weapons in Ukraine.
1994	Bishkek Protocol	Provisional ceasefire agreement between Armenia and Azerbaijan.
1994	United Nations Convention on the Law of the Sea (Note: Also known, in its abbreviated form, as the UNCLOS.)	Provides universal legal controls for the management of marine natural resources and the control of pollution.
1994	United Nations Convention to Combat Desertification (Note: Also known as the United Nations Convention to Combat Desertification in Those Countries Experiencing Serious Drought and/or Desertification, Particularly in Africa.)	Agreement to combat desertification and to mitigate the effects of drought; came into force in 1996.
1994	Convention on Nuclear Safety	States agree to general safety rules regarding civilian nuclear power plants and programmes.
1994	Budapest Memorandum on Security Assurances	Provides security guarantee to Ukraine, Kazakhstan and Belarus from US, UK and Russia.
1994	Agreement on a Cease-fire and Separation of Forces	Georgia and Abkhaz separatists sign a ceasefire agreement which provides for the deployment of UN-mandated CIS peacekeeping force to the conflict region.
1994	Trademark Law Treaty	Adopted in Geneva on October 27, 1994
1995	Erdut Agreement (Note: Also known as the Basic Agreement on the Region of Eastern Slavonia, Baranja and Western Sirmium.)	Peaceful resolution of the conflict in Eastern Slavonia.
1995	Dayton Agreement (Note: Also known as the Dayton Accords, the Dayton-Paris Agreement and the General Framework Agreement for Peace in Bosnia and Herzegovina.)	Ends Bosnian War.
1995	General Agreement on Trade in Services (GATT) (Note: Also known, in its abbreviated form, as the GATS.)	Extends the multilateral trading system to provide services (i.e. tertiary sector of industry).
1996	Comprehensive Nuclear-Test-Ban Treaty (Note: Also known, in its abbreviated form, as the CTBT.)	Forbids all nuclear explosions in all environments for military or civilian purposes.
1996	Khasavyurt Accord	Ceasefire agreement that ends the First Chechen War.
1996	WIPO Copyright Treaty (Note: Also known as the World Intellectual Property Organization Copyright Treaty.)	Provides additional protections for copyright deemed necessary due to advances in information technology.
1996	WIPO Performances and Phonograms Treaty (Note: Also known, in its abbreviated form, as the WPPT.)	Establishes rights and privileges for performers and producers of audio-visual works.
1996	Mahakali treaty (Note: Also known as Sarada Treaty.)	Agreement between the Government of Nepal and the Government of India regarding the development of watershed of Mahakali River.
1997	Amsterdam Treaty (Note: Also known as the Treaty of Amsterdam amending the Treaty of the European Union, the Treaties establishing the European Communities and certain related acts.)	Substantially revises the Maastricht Treaty; came into effect on May 1, 1999.
1997	Ottawa Treaty (Note: Also known as the Mine Ban Treaty and the Convention on the Prohibition of the Use, Stockpiling, Production and Transfer of Anti-Personnel Mines and on their Destruction.)	Bans all anti-personnel landmines (AP-mines).
1997	Chemical Weapons Convention (Note: Also known as the Convention on the Prohibition of the Development, Production, Stockpiling and Use of Chemical Weapons and on their Destruction.)	Outlaws the production, stockpiling and use of chemical weapons.
1997	Kyoto Protocol (Note: Also known formally as the Kyoto Protocol to the United Nations Framework Convention on Climate Change.)	Mandates the reduction of greenhouse-gas emissions; negotiated in 1997, ratified in 2004, and went into effect in 2005.
1997	Russian–Ukrainian Friendship Treaty (Note: Also known formally as the Treaty on Friendship, Cooperation, and Partnership between Ukraine and the Russian Federation.)	Fixes the principle of strategic partnership, the recognition of the inviolability of existing borders, respect for territorial integrity and mutual commitment not to use its territory to harm the security of each other. Ratified in 1998 by Ukraine and in 1999 by Russia.
1997	Russia–Chechnya Peace Treaty	Russia and Chechen republic of Ichkeria sign a peace treaty following the First Chechen War, but the issue of independence remains unresolved and leads to the Second Chechen War.
1998	Good Friday Agreement (Note: Also known as the Belfast Agreement and rarely known as the Stormont Agreement.)	Major political development in the Northern Ireland peace process.
1998	POP Air Pollution Protocol (Note: Also known as the Protocol to the 1979 Convention on Long-Range Transboundary Air Pollution on Persistent Organic Pollutants.)	Agreement to provide for the control and reduction of emissions of persistent organic pollutants; has not yet come into effect.
1998	Rome Statute of the International Criminal Court (Note: Also known as the Rome Statute.)	Establishes the International Criminal Court.
1999	Adapted Conventional Armed Forces in Europe Treaty	Replaces ceilings given to NATO and the Warsaw Pact with territorial ones.
1999	East African Community Treaty	Establishes the East African Community between Uganda, Kenya and the Republic of Tanzania; went into effect on July 7, 2000.
1999	Kumanovo Agreement	Concluded the Kosovo War; went into effect on June 9, 1999.
1999	Narrative Protocol on Eastern and Western Sections of the China–Russia Boundary between the Government of the People's Republic of China and the Government of the Russian Federation	China's Jiang Zemin and Russia's president, Boris Yeltsin, signed in Beijing on Dec 9th, 1999. The treaty formally recognized 1.6 million square kilometers of land occupied by Russia belongs to Russia, and gave Russia the exit point of the Tumen River, cutting off northeast China from the Sea of Japan
1999	Treaty Between the United States of America and Ukraine on Mutual Legal Assistance in Criminal Matters	Establishes an agreement to provide mutual assistance in connection with the investigation, prosecution and prevention of offenses, and in proceedings related to criminal matters.

== 2000–present ==
Year	Name	Summary
2000	Cotonou Agreement	Attempts to reduce poverty and integrate the ACP countries into the world economy; came into force in 2002.
2000	Patent Law Treaty (Note: Also known, in its abbreviated form, as the PLT.)	Harmonizes formal procedures such as the requirements to obtain a filing date for a patent application, the form and content of a patent application, and representation.
2000	Treaty of Jeddah (2000)	Resolves a border dispute between Saudi Arabia and Yemen that dates backs to Saudi boundary claims made in 1934.
2000	Algiers Agreement (2000)	A peace agreement between Eritrea and Ethiopia to formally end the Eritrean–Ethiopian War.
2001	Agreement on the Conservation of Albatrosses and Petrels	Attempts to prevent the decline of seabird populations in the southern hemisphere, particularly albatrosses and procellariidae.
2001	Treaty of Nice	Amends two founding treaties of the European Union.
2001	Ohrid Agreement	Ends the armed conflict between the Albanian National Liberation Army and Macedonia (now called North Macedonia).
2001	2001 Sino-Russian Treaty of Friendship	Twenty-year strategic treaty between Russia and the People's Republic of China.
2001	Budapest Convention on Cybercrime	Prohibits the use of computers or networks as tools for criminal activity.
2002	Timor Sea Treaty	Between the governments of Australia and East Timor.
2002	Strategic Offensive Reductions Treaty (Note: Also known as the Moscow Treaty and SORT.)	Limits the nuclear arsenals of Russia and the United States.
2002	Pretoria Accord	Rwandan troops withdraw from the Democratic Republic of the Congo in exchange for international commitment towards the disarmament of the interahamwe and the ex-FAR fighters.
2002	Gbadolite Agreement	Attempts to cease hostilities between the warring factions in the Second Congo War; treaty has limited effect.
2002	ASEAN Agreement on Transboundary Haze Pollution	Between ASEAN nations to bring haze pollution under control in Southeast Asia.
2003	ASEAN Free Trade Area (Note: Also known, in its abbreviated form, as AFTA.)	Agreement by the Association of Southeast Asian Nations, of local manufacturing in all ASEAN countries.
2003	Treaty of Accession 2003	Integrates ten nations into the European Union; came into force on May 1, 2004.
2003	Accra Comprehensive Peace Agreement	Ended the Second Liberian Civil War on August 18, 2003.
2003	WHO Framework Convention on Tobacco Control (Note: Also known, in abbreviated form, as FCTC.)	First public health treaty of the world; came into force on February 27, 2005. Its purpose is to "protect present and future generations from the devastating health, social, environmental and economic consequences of tobacco consumption and exposure to tobacco smoke."
2004	International Treaty on Plant Genetic Resources for Food and Agriculture (Note: Also known as the International Seed Treaty.)	Assures farmers' facilitated access to seeds of the world's food security crops; came into force on June 29, 2004.
2005	Comprehensive Peace Agreement (Note: Also known as the Naivasha Agreement.)	Ended the Second Sudanese Civil War between the Government of Sudan and the Sudan People's Liberation Army; creates the Government of National Unity. Signed on January 9, 2005, and scheduled for full implementation by July 9, 2011.
2005	Energy Community Treaty	Establishes the Energy Community.
2005	Treaty of Accession 2005	Integrates two nations (Bulgaria and Romania) into the European Union; came into force on January 1, 2007.
2006	Tripoli Agreement (Note: Also known as the Libya Accord or the Tripoli Declaration.)	Ends Chadian–Sudanese conflict.GRATK Treaty milestones
2006	Singapore Treaty on the Law of Trademarks	Adopted in Singapore, on March 27, 2006
2006	Waziristan Accord (Note: Also known as the North Waziristan Accord.)	Ends Waziristan War.
2006	St Andrews Agreement	Resolves outstanding grievances in the Northern Ireland peace process, enabling devolved power-sharing government to resume.
2007	Treaty of Lisbon	Reforming the European Union.
2007	ASEAN Charter	New constitution making the Association of Southeast Asian Nations a legal entity.
2008	UNASUR Constitutive Treaty	Treaty establishing the Union of South American Nations.
2010	Barents Sea border treaty	Treaty signed 15 September in Murmansk between the Government of the Russian Federation and the Government of the Kingdom of Norway. This treaty ends decades of negotiations over the maritime border in the Barents Sea.
2010	Nagoya Protocol	Implementation of one of the three objectives of the Convention on Biological Diversity (1992): fair and equitable sharing of benefits arising out of the utilization of genetic resources, thereby contributing to the conservation and sustainable use of biodiversity.
2010	Global Plan of Action to Combat Trafficking in Persons	A human trafficking action plan adopted by the United Nations
2011	Arctic Search and Rescue Agreement	Treaty among the 8 member states of the Arctic Council signed 12 May 2011. It coordinates international search and rescue (SAR) coverage and response in the Arctic.
2011	Treaty of Accession 2011	Integrates Croatia into the European Union; came into force on July 1, 2013.
2012	Framework Agreement on the Bangsamoro	Treaty between the Philippine government and the Islamic liberation group, Moro Islamic Liberation Front. The treaty seeks to create a new autonomous political entity named Bangsamoro to replace the Autonomous Region in Muslim Mindanao.
2012	Beijing Treaty on Audiovisual Performances	The Beijing Treaty on Audiovisual Performances was adopted on June 24, 2012, and entered into force on April 28, 2020. It deals with the intellectual property rights of performers in audiovisual performances.
2013	Intergovernmental Agreement on Dry Ports	Treaty among the members of the member states of the United Nations Economic and Social Commission for Asia and the Pacific to facilitate cooperation in the development of a network of dry ports in Asia.
2013	Marrakesh VIP Treaty	Adopted on June 27, 2013 in Marrakesh. It forms part of the body of international copyright treaties administered by World Intellectual Property Organization (WIPO).
2014	Convention on the Manipulation of Sports Competitions	Council of Europe treaty to combat match fixing in sports
2014	Buffalo Treaty	An intertribal treaty to restore continuous wild buffalo populations on the Great Plains.
2014	Treaty on the Accession of Crimea to Russia	Treaty signed between Russia and the self-declared independent Republic of Crimea which is only recognised by a small number of countries
2015	Paris Agreement	Agreement dealing with greenhouse-gas emissions mitigation
2015	Geneva Act of the Lisbon Agreement on Appellations of Origin and Geographical Indications	Treaty extending protections of the Lisbon Agreement (1958) to Geographical Indications
2017	Treaty on the Prohibition of Nuclear Weapons	The first legally binding international agreement to comprehensively prohibit nuclear weapons, with the goal of leading towards their total elimination.
2018	Prespa agreement	The final agreement between Greece and the then-Republic of Macedonia for the name of the second.
2019	Treaty of Aachen (2019)	Bilateral treaty between France and Germany for regional issues; including, military, cultural, and political issues. With special attention being given to defense politics.
2019	United States–Mexico–Canada Agreement	Trilateral free trade agreement which replaced NAFTA (1994).
2020	2020 Nagorno-Karabakh ceasefire agreement	The armistice agreement that ended the Second Nagorno-Karabakh War.
2020	Darfur Peace Agreement	An agreement signed by the Government of Sudan and Darfur-based rebel groups with the intention of ending the Darfur Conflict.
2020	Agreement for Bringing Peace to Afghanistan	The Agreement for Bringing Peace to Afghanistan, commonly known as the United States–Taliban deal or the Doha Accord, was a peace agreement signed by the United States and the Taliban on 29 February 2020 in Doha, Qatar, to bring an end to the 2001–2021 war in Afghanistan.
2021	Armenia–EU Comprehensive and Enhanced Partnership Agreement (CEPA)	An agreement governing the bilateral relations between Armenia and the EU.
2022	Ethiopia–Tigray peace agreement	A peace treaty that ended the Tigray War.
2023	Treaty of Jeddah (2023)	The agreement was intended to facilitate a week-long ceasefire in the 2023 Sudan conflict but expired two days after the signing due to a sudden surge in hostilities.
2024	Riyadh Design Law Treaty	The Riyadh Design Law Treaty (RDLT) was adopted on November 22, 2024, and will enter into force three months after there have been 15 ratifications or accessions.
2024	WIPO Treaty on Intellectual Property, Genetic Resources and Associated Traditional Knowledge (Note: Also known as GRATK Treaty milestones.)	Adopted in Geneva – May 24, 2024
2026	Defense treaty between Turkiye, Saudi Arabia and Pakistan	Signed in Mecca – August 7, 2026

== Pending ==
- Central American Free Trade Agreement
- Free Trade Area of the Americas
- Substantive Patent Law Treaty (SPLT)
- WIPO Protection of Broadcasting Organizations
- Anti-Counterfeiting Trade Agreement
