= List of Council of Europe treaties =

This is a list of multilateral treaties administered by the Council of Europe, known as the Council of Europe Treaty Series (CETS). As of December 2025, there are 231 Council of Europe treaties.

No.	Full title	Conclusion	Entry into force	E (Note: Open to signature/ratification or accession by European states that are not members of the Council of Europe)	Non-E (Note: Open to signature/ratification or accession by non-European states (they cannot be members of the Council of Europe))	EU (Note: Open to signature/ratification or accession by the European Union)
001	Statute of the Council of Europe	5-May-1949	3-Aug-1949	no (Note: A state becomes a member of the Council of Europe by ratifying the Statute of the Council of Europe. Therefore, no European state that ratifies this treaty remains a non-Council of Europe member.)	no	no
002	General Agreement on Privileges and Immunities of the Council of Europe	2-Sep-1949	10-Sep-1952	no	no	no
005	Convention for the Protection of Human Rights and Fundamental Freedoms	4-Nov-1950	3-Sep-1953	no	no	yes
009	Protocol to the Convention for the Protection of Human Rights and Fundamental Freedoms	20-Mar-1952	18-May-1954	no	no	no
010	Protocol to the General Agreement on Privileges and Immunities of the Council of Europe	6-Nov-1952	11-Jul-1956	no	no	no
012	European Interim Agreement on Social Security Schemes Relating to Old Age, Invalidity and Survivors	11-Dec-1953	1-Jul-1954	yes	yes	no
012A	Protocol to the European Interim Agreement on Social Security Schemes Relating to Old Age, Invalidity and Survivors	11-Dec-1953	1-Oct-1954	yes	yes	no
013	European Interim Agreement on Social Security other than Schemes for Old Age, Invalidity and Survivors	11-Dec-1953	1-Jul-1954	yes	yes	no
013A	Protocol to the European Interim Agreement on Social Security other than Schemes for Old Age, Invalidity and Survivors	11-Dec-1953	1-Oct-1954	yes	yes	no
014	European Convention on Social and Medical Assistance	11-Dec-1953	1-Jul-1954	yes	yes	no
014A	Protocol to the European Convention on Social and Medical Assistance	11-Dec-1953	1-Jul-1954	yes	yes	no
015	European Convention on the Equivalence of Diplomas leading to Admission to Universities	11-Dec-1953	20-Apr-1954	yes	yes	no
016	European Convention relating to the Formalities required for Patent Applications	11-Dec-1953	1-Jun-1955	yes	yes	no
017	European Convention on the International Classification of Patents for Invention	19-Dec-1954	1-Aug-1955	yes	yes	no
018	European Cultural Convention	19-Dec-1954	5-May-1955	yes	no	no
019	European Convention on Establishment	13-Dec-1955	23-Feb-1965	no	no	no
020	Agreement on the Exchange of War Cripples between Member Countries of the Council of Europe with a view to Medical Treatment	13-Dec-1955	1-Jan-1956	yes	yes	no
021	European Convention on the Equivalence of Periods of University Study	15-Dec-1956	18-Sep-1957	yes	yes	no
022	Second Protocol to the General Agreement on Privileges and Immunities of the Council of Europe	15-Dec-1956	15-Dec-1956	no	no	no
023	European Convention for the Peaceful Settlement of Disputes	29-Apr-1957	30-Apr-1958	yes	yes	no
024	European Convention on Extradition	13-Dec-1957	18-Apr-1960	yes	yes	no
025	European Agreement on Regulations governing the Movement of Persons between Member States of the Council of Europe	13-Dec-1957	1-Jan-1958	yes	yes	no
026	European Agreement on the Exchange of Therapeutic Substances of Human Origin	15-Dec-1958	1-Jan-1959	yes	yes	yes
027	European Agreement concerning Programme Exchanges by means of Television Films	15-Dec-1958	1-Jul-1961	yes	yes	no
028	Third Protocol to the General Agreement on Privileges and Immunities of the Council of Europe	6-Mar-1959	15-Mar-1963	no	no	no
029	European Convention on Compulsory Insurance against Civil Liability in respect of Motor Vehicles	20-Apr-1959	22-Sep-1969	yes	yes	no
030	European Convention on Mutual Assistance in Criminal Matters	20-Apr-1959	12-Jun-1962	yes	yes	no
031	European Agreement on the Abolition of Visas for Refugees	20-Apr-1959	4-Sep-1960	yes	yes	no
032	European Convention on the Academic Recognition of University Qualifications	14-Dec-1959	27-Nov-1961	yes	yes	no
033	Agreement on the Temporary Importation, free of duty, of Medical, Surgical and Laboratory Equipment for use on free loan in Hospitals and other Medical Institutions for purposes of Diagnosis or Treatment	28-Apr-1960	29-Jul-1960	yes	yes	yes
034	European Agreement on the Protection of Television Broadcasts	22-Jun-1960	1-Jul-1961	no	no	no
035	European Social Charter	18-Oct-1961	26-Feb-1965	no	no	no
036	Fourth Protocol to the General Agreement on Privileges and Immunities of the Council of Europe	16-Dec-1961	16-Dec-1961	no	no	no
037	European Agreement on Travel by Young Persons on Collective Passports between the Member Countries of the Council of Europe	16-Dec-1961	17-Jan-1962	yes	yes	no
038	European Agreement on Mutual Assistance in the matter of Special Medical Treatments and Climatic Facilities	14-May-1962	15-Jun-1962	yes	yes	no
039	European Agreement on the Exchanges of Blood-Grouping Reagents	14-May-1962	14-Oct-1962	yes	yes	yes
040	Agreement between the Member States of the Council of Europe on the issue to Military and Civilian War-Disabled of an International Book of Vouchers for the repair of Prosthetic and Orthopaedic Appliances	17-Dec-1962	27-Dec-1963	yes	yes	no
041	Convention on the Liability of Hotel-keepers concerning the Property of their Guests	17-Dec-1962	15-Feb-1967	yes	yes	no
042	Agreement relating to Application of the European Convention on International Commercial Arbitration	17-Dec-1962	25-Jan-1965	yes	yes	no
043	Convention on the Reduction of Cases of Multiple Nationality and on Military Obligations in Cases of Multiple Nationality	6-May-1963	28-Mar-1968	yes	yes	no
044	Protocol No. 2 to the Convention for the Protection of Human Rights and Fundamental Freedoms, conferring upon the European Court of Human Rights competence to give advisory opinions	6-May-1963	21-Sep-1970	no	no	no
045	Protocol No. 3 to the Convention for the Protection of Human Rights and Fundamental Freedoms, amending Articles 29, 30 and 34 of the Convention	6-May-1963	21-Sep-1970	no	no	no
046	Protocol No. 4 to the Convention for the Protection of Human Rights and Fundamental Freedoms, securing certain rights and freedoms other than those already included in the Convention and in the first Protocol thereto	16-Sep-1963	2-May-1968	no	no	no
047	Convention on the Unification of Certain Points of Substantive Law on Patents for Invention	27-Nov-1963	1-Aug-1980	yes	yes	no
048	European Code of Social Security	16-Apr-1964	17-Mar-1968	yes	yes	no
048A	Protocol to the European Code of Social Security	16-Apr-1964	17-Mar-1968	yes	yes	no
049	Protocol to the European Convention on the Equivalence of Diplomas leading to Admission to Universities	3-Jun-1964	4-Jul-1964	yes	yes	no
050	Convention on the Elaboration of a European Pharmacopoeia	22-Jul-1964	8-May-1974	yes	no	yes
051	European Convention on the Supervision of Conditionally Sentenced or Conditionally Released Offenders	30-Nov-1964	22-Aug-1975	yes	yes	no
052	European Convention on the Punishment of Road Traffic Offences	30-Nov-1964	18-Jul-1972	yes	yes	no
053	European Agreement for the Prevention of Broadcasts transmitted from Stations outside National Territories	22-Jan-1965	19-Oct-1967	yes	yes	no
054	Protocol to the European Agreement on the Protection of Television Broadcasts	22-Jan-1965	24-Mar-1965	yes	yes	no
055	Protocol No. 5 to the Convention for the Protection of Human Rights and Fundamental Freedoms, amending Articles 22 and 40 of the Convention	20-Jan-1966	20-Dec-1971	no	no	no
056	European Convention providing a Uniform Law on Arbitration	20-Jan-1966		yes	yes	no
057	European Convention on Establishment of Companies	20-Jan-1966		no	no	no
058	European Convention on the Adoption of Children	24-Apr-1967	26-Apr-1968	yes	yes	no
059	European Agreement on the Instruction and Education of Nurses	25-Oct-1967	7-Aug-1969	yes	yes	no
060	European Convention on Foreign Money Liabilities	11-Dec-1967		yes	yes	no
061	European Convention on Consular Functions	11-Dec-1967	9-Jun-2011	yes	no	no
061A	Protocol to the European Convention on Consular Functions concerning the Protection of Refugees	11-Dec-1967		yes	no	no
061B	Protocol to the European Convention on Consular Functions relating to Consular Functions in respect of Civil Aircraft	11-Dec-1967		yes	no	no
062	European Convention on Information on Foreign Law	7-Jun-1968	17-Dec-1969	yes	yes	no
063	European Convention on the Abolition of Legalisation of Documents executed by Diplomatic Agents or Consular Officers	7-Jun-1968	14-Aug-1970	yes	yes	no
064	European Agreement on the Restriction of the Use of certain Detergents in Washing and Cleaning Products	16-Sep-1968	16-Feb-1971	yes	yes	no
065	European Convention for the Protection of Animals during International Transport	13-Dec-1968	20-Feb-1971	yes	yes	yes
066	European Convention on the Protection of the Archaeological Heritage	6-May-1969	20-Nov-1970	yes	yes	no
067	European Agreement relating to Persons participating in Proceedings of the European Commission and Court of Human Rights	6-May-1969	17-Apr-1971	no	no	no
068	European Agreement on Au Pair Placement	24-Nov-1969	30-May-1971	yes	yes	no
069	European Agreement on continued Payment of Scholarships to students studying abroad	12-Dec-1969	2-Oct-1971	yes	yes	no
070	European Convention on the International Validity of Criminal Judgments	28-May-1970	26-Jul-1974	yes	yes	no
071	European Convention on the Repatriation of Minors	28-May-1970	28-Jul-2015	yes	yes	no
072	Convention relating to Stops on Bearer Securities in International Circulation	28-May-1970	11-Feb-1979	yes	yes	no
073	European Convention on the Transfer of Proceedings in Criminal Matters	15-May-1972	30-Mar-1978	yes	yes	no
074	European Convention on State Immunity	16-May-1972	11-Jun-1976	yes	yes	no
074A	Additional Protocol to the European Convention on State Immunity	16-May-1972	22-May-1985	yes	yes	no
075	European Convention on the Place of Payment of Money Liabilities	16-May-1972		yes	yes	no
076	European Convention on the Calculation of Time-Limits	16-May-1972	28-Apr-1983	yes	yes	no
077	Convention on the Establishment of a Scheme of Registration of Wills	16-May-1972	20-Mar-1976	yes	yes	no
078	European Convention on Social Security	14-Dec-1972	1-Mar-1977	yes	yes	no
078A	Supplementary Agreement for the Application of the European Convention on Social Security	14-Dec-1972	1-Mar-1977	yes	yes	no
079	European Convention on Civil Liability for Damage caused by Motor Vehicles	14-May-1973		yes	yes	no
080	Agreement on the Transfer of Corpses	26-Oct-1973	11-Nov-1975	yes	yes	no
081	Additional Protocol to the Protocol to the European Agreement on the Protection of Television Broadcasts	14-Jan-1974	31-Dec-1974	yes	yes	no
082	European Convention on the Non-Applicability of Statutory Limitation to Crimes against Humanity and War Crimes	25-Jan-1974	27-Jun-2003	yes	yes	no
083	European Convention on the Social Protection of Farmers	6-May-1974	17-Jun-1977	yes	yes	no
084	European Agreement on the Exchange of Tissue-Typing Reagents	17-Sep-1974	23-Apr-1977	yes	yes	yes
085	European Convention on the Legal Status of Children born out of Wedlock	15-Oct-1975	11-Aug-1978	yes	yes	no
086	Additional Protocol to the European Convention on Extradition	15-Oct-1975	20-Aug-1979	yes	yes	no
087	European Convention for the Protection of Animals kept for Farming Purposes	10-Mar-1976	10-Sep-1978	yes	yes	yes
088	European Convention on the International Effects of Deprivation of the Right to Drive a Motor Vehicle	3-Jun-1976	28-Apr-1983	yes	yes	no
089	Additional Protocol to the European Agreement on the Exchange of Tissue-Typing Reagents	24-Jun-1976	23-Apr-1977	yes	yes	yes
090	European Convention on the Suppression of Terrorism	27-Jan-1977	4-Aug-1978	no	no	no
091	European Convention on Products Liability in regard to Personal Injury and Death	27-Jan-1977		yes	yes	no
092	European Agreement on the Transmission of Applications for Legal Aid	27-Jan-1977	28-Feb-1977	yes	yes	no
093	European Convention on the Legal Status of Migrant Workers	24-Nov-1977	1-May-1983	no	no	no
094	European Convention on the Service Abroad of Documents relating to Administrative Matters	24-Nov-1977	1-Nov-1982	yes	yes	no
095	Protocol amending the Convention on the Reduction of Cases of Multiple Nationality and Military Obligations in Cases of Multiple Nationality	24-Nov-1977	8-Sep-1978	yes	yes	no
096	Additional Protocol to the Convention on the Reduction of Cases of Multiple Nationality and Military Obligations in Cases of Multiple Nationality	24-Nov-1977	17-Oct-1983	yes	yes	no
097	Additional Protocol to the European Convention on Information on Foreign Law	15-Mar-1978	31-Aug-1979	yes	yes	no
098	Second Additional Protocol to the European Convention on Extradition	17-Mar-1978	5-Jun-1983	yes	yes	no
099	Additional Protocol to the European Convention on Mutual Assistance in Criminal Matters	17-Mar-1978	12-Apr-1982	yes	yes	no
100	European Convention on the Obtaining Abroad of Information and Evidence in Administrative Matters	15-Mar-1978	1-Jan-1983	yes	yes	no
101	European Convention on the Control of the Acquisition and Possession of Firearms by Individuals	28-Jun-1978	1-Jul-1982	yes	yes	no
102	European Convention for the Protection of Animals for Slaughter	10-May-1979	11-Jun-1982	yes	yes	yes
103	Additional Protocol to the European Convention for the Protection of Animals during International Transport	10-May-1979	7-Nov-1989	yes	yes	yes
104	Convention on the Conservation of European Wildlife and Natural Habitats	19-Sep-1979	1-Jun-1982	yes	yes	yes
105	European Convention on Recognition and Enforcement of Decisions concerning Custody of Children and on Restoration of Custody of Children	20-May-1980	1-Sep-1983	yes	yes	no
106	European Outline Convention on Transfrontier Co-operation between Territorial Communities or Authorities	21-May-1980	22-Dec-1981	yes	no	no
107	European Agreement on Transfer of Responsibility for Refugees	16-Oct-1980	1-Dec-1980	yes	yes	no
108	Convention for the Protection of Individuals with regard to Automatic Processing of Personal Data	28-Jan-1981	1-Oct-1985	yes	yes	no
109	Additional Protocol to the European Agreement on the Exchange of Therapeutic Substances of Human Origin	1-Jan-1983	1-Jan-1985	yes	yes	no
110	Additional Protocol to the Agreement on the Temporary Importation, free of duty, of Medical, Surgical and Laboratory Equipment for Use on free loan in Hospitals and other Medical Institutions for Purposes of Diagnosis or Treatment	1-Jan-1983	1-Jan-1985	yes	yes	no
111	Additional Protocol to the European Agreement on the Exchanges of Blood-Grouping Reagents	1-Jan-1983	1-Jan-1985	yes	yes	no
112	Convention on the Transfer of Sentenced Persons	21-Mar-1983	1-Jul-1985	yes	yes	no
113	Additional Protocol to the Protocol to the European Agreement on the Protection of Television Broadcasts	21-Mar-1983	1-Jan-1985	yes	yes	no
114	Protocol No. 6 to the Convention for the Protection of Human Rights and Fundamental Freedoms concerning the Abolition of the Death Penalty	28-Apr-1983	1-Mar-1985	no	no	no
115	Protocol amending the European Agreement on the Restriction of the Use of certain Detergents in Washing and Cleaning Products	25-Oct-1983	1-Nov-1984	yes	yes	no
116	European Convention on the Compensation of Victims of Violent Crimes	24-Nov-1983	1-Feb-1988	yes	yes	no
117	Protocol No. 7 to the Convention for the Protection of Human Rights and Fundamental Freedoms	22-Nov-1984	1-Nov-1988	no	no	no
118	Protocol No. 8 to the Convention for the Protection of Human Rights and Fundamental Freedoms	19-Mar-1985	1-Jan-1990	no	no	no
119	European Convention on Offences relating to Cultural Property	23-Jun-1985		yes	yes	no
120	European Convention on Spectator Violence and Misbehaviour at Sports Events and in particular at Football Matches	19-Aug-1985	1-Nov-1985	yes	yes	no
121	Convention for the Protection of the Architectural Heritage of Europe	3-Oct-1985	1-Dec-1987	yes	yes	yes
122	European Charter of Local Self-Government	15-Oct-1985	1-Sep-1988	no	no	no
123	European Convention for the Protection of Vertebrate Animals used for Experimental and other Scientific Purposes	18-Mar-1986	1-Jan-1991	yes	yes	yes
124	European Convention on the Recognition of the Legal Personality of International Non-Governmental Organisations	24-Apr-1986	1-Jan-1991	yes	yes	no
125	European Convention for the Protection of Pet Animals	13-Nov-1987	1-May-1992	yes	yes	no
126	European Convention for the Prevention of Torture and Inhuman or Degrading Treatment or Punishment	26-Nov-1987	1-Feb-1989	yes	yes	no
127	Convention on Mutual Administrative Assistance in Tax Matters	25-Jan-1988	1-Apr-1995	yes	yes	no
128	Additional Protocol to the European Social Charter	5-May-1988	4-Sep-1992	no	no	no
129	Arrangement for the Application of the European Agreement of 17 October 1980 concerning the Provision of Medical Care to Persons during Temporary Residence	26-May-1988		yes	no	no
130	Convention on Insider Trading	20-Apr-1989	1-Oct-1991	yes	yes	yes
131	Third Additional Protocol to the Protocol to the European Agreement on the Protection of Television Broadcasts	20-Apr-1989		yes	yes	no
132	European Convention on Transfrontier Television	5-May-1989	1-May-1993	yes	yes	yes
133	Protocol to the Convention on Insider Trading	11-Sep-1989	1-Oct-1991	no	no	no
134	Protocol to the Convention on the Elaboration of a European Pharmacopoeia	16-Nov-1989	1-Nov-1992	yes	no	yes
135	Anti-Doping Convention	16-Nov-1989	1-Mar-1990	yes	yes	no
136	European Convention on Certain International Aspects of Bankruptcy	5-Jun-1990		yes	yes	no
137	Fifth Protocol to the General Agreement on Privileges and Immunities of the Council of Europe	18-Jun-1990	1-Nov-1991	no	no	no
138	European Convention on the General Equivalence of Periods of University Study	6-Nov-1990	1-Jan-1991	yes	yes	yes
139	European Code of Social Security (Revised)	6-Nov-1990		yes	yes	yes
140	Protocol No. 9 to the Convention for the Protection of Human Rights and Fundamental Freedoms	6-Nov-1990	1-Oct-1994	no	no	no
141	Convention on Laundering, Search, Seizure and Confiscation of the Proceeds from Crime	8-Nov-1990	1-Sep-1993	yes	yes	no
142	Protocol amending the European Social Charter	21-Oct-1991		no	no	no
143	European Convention on the Protection of the Archaeological Heritage (Revised)	16-Jan-1992	25-May-1995	yes	yes	yes
144	Convention on the Participation of Foreigners in Public Life at Local Level	5-Feb-1992	1-May-1997	yes	yes	no
145	Protocol of Amendment to the European Convention for the Protection of Animals kept for Farming Purposes	6-Feb-1992		yes	yes	yes
146	Protocol No. 10 to the Convention for the Protection of Human Rights and Fundamental Freedoms	25-Mar-1992		no	no	no
147	European Convention on Cinematographic Co-Production	2-Oct-1992	1-Apr-1994	yes	no	yes
148	European Charter for Regional or Minority Languages	5-Nov-1992	1-Mar-1998	yes	yes	no
149	Second Protocol amending the Convention on the Reduction of Cases of Multiple Nationality and Military Obligations in Cases of Multiple Nationality	2-Feb-1993	24-Mar-1995	yes	yes	no
150	Convention on Civil Liability for Damage resulting from Activities Dangerous to the Environment	21-Jun-1993		yes	yes	yes
151	Protocol No. 1 to the European Convention for the Prevention of Torture and Inhuman or Degrading Treatment or Punishment	4-Nov-1993	1-Mar-2002	no	no	no
152	Protocol No. 2 to the European Convention for the Prevention of Torture and Inhuman or Degrading Treatment or Punishment	4-Nov-1993	1-Mar-2002	no	no	no
153	European Convention relating to questions on Copyright Law and Neighbouring Rights in the Framework of Transfrontier Broadcasting by Satellite	11-May-1994		yes	no	yes
154	Protocol to the European Convention on Social Security	11-May-1994		yes	yes	no
155	Protocol No. 11 to the Convention for the Protection of Human Rights and Fundamental Freedoms, restructuring the control machinery established thereby	11-May-1994	1-Nov-1998	no	no	no
156	Agreement on Illicit Traffic by Sea, implementing Article 17 of the United Nations Convention against Illicit Traffic in Narcotic Drugs and Psychotropic Substances	31-Jan-1995	1-May-2000	yes	yes	no
157	Framework Convention for the Protection of National Minorities	1-Feb-1995	1-Feb-1998	yes	yes	no
158	Additional Protocol to the European Social Charter Providing for a System of Collective Complaints	9-Nov-1995	1-Jul-1998	no	no	no
159	Additional Protocol to the European Outline Convention on Transfrontier Co-operation between Territorial Communities or Authorities	9-Nov-1995	1-Dec-1998	yes	no	no
160	European Convention on the Exercise of Children's Rights	25-Jan-1996	1-Jul-2000	yes	yes	yes
161	European Agreement relating to persons participating in proceedings of the European Court of Human Rights	5-Mar-1996	1-Jan-1999	no	no	no
162	Sixth Protocol to the General Agreement on Privileges and Immunities of the Council of Europe	5-Mar-1996	1-Nov-1998	no	no	no
163	European Social Charter (revised)	3-May-1996	1-Jul-1999	no	no	no
164	Convention for the Protection of Human Rights and Dignity of the Human Being with regard to the Application of Biology and Medicine: Convention on Human Rights and Biomedicine	4-Apr-1997	1-Dec-1999	yes	yes	yes
165	Convention on the Recognition of Qualifications concerning Higher Education in the European Region	11-Apr-1997	1-Feb-1999	yes	yes	yes
166	European Convention on Nationality	6-Nov-1997	1-Mar-2000	yes	yes	no
167	Additional Protocol to the Convention on the Transfer of Sentenced Persons	18-Dec-1997	1-Jun-2000	yes	yes	no
168	Additional Protocol to the Convention for the Protection of Human Rights and Dignity of the Human Being with regard to the Application of Biology and Medicine, on the Prohibition of Cloning Human Beings	12-Jan-1998	1-Mar-2001	yes	yes	yes
169	Protocol No. 2 to the European Outline Convention on Transfrontier Co-operation between Territorial Communities or Authorities concerning interterritorial co-operation	5-May-1998	1-Feb-2001	yes	no	no
170	Protocol of Amendment to the European Convention for the Protection of Vertebrate Animals used for Experimental and other Scientific Purposes	22-Jun-1998	2-Dec-2005	yes	yes	yes
171	Protocol amending the European Convention on Transfrontier Television	1-Oct-1998	1-Mar-2002	yes	yes	yes
172	Convention on the Protection of Environment through Criminal Law	4-Nov-1998		yes	yes	no
173	Criminal Law Convention on Corruption	27-Jan-1999	1-Jul-2002	yes	yes	yes
174	Civil Law Convention on Corruption	4-Nov-1999	1-Nov-2003	yes	yes	yes
175	European Convention on the Promotion of a Transnational Long-Term Voluntary Service for Young People	11-May-2000		yes	no	no
176	European Landscape Convention	20-Oct-2000	1-Mar-2004	yes	no	no
177	Protocol No. 12 to the Convention for the Protection of Human Rights and Fundamental Freedoms	4-Nov-2000	1-Apr-2005	no	no	no
178	European Convention on the Legal Protection of Services based on, or consisting of, Conditional Access	24-Jan-2001	1-Jul-2003	yes	yes	yes
179	Additional Protocol to the European Agreement on the Transmission of Applications for Legal Aid	4-Oct-2001	1-Sep-2002	yes	yes	no
180	Convention on Information and Legal Co-operation concerning "Information Society Services"	4-Oct-2001		yes	yes	yes
181	Additional Protocol to the Convention for the Protection of Individuals with regard to Automatic Processing of Personal Data, regarding supervisory authorities and transborder data flows	8-Nov-2001	1-Jul-2004	yes	yes	yes
182	Second Additional Protocol to the European Convention on Mutual Assistance in Criminal Matters	8-Nov-2001	1-Feb-2004	yes	yes	no
183	European Convention for the Protection of the Audiovisual Heritage	8-Nov-2001	1-Jan-2008	yes	yes	yes
184	Protocol to the European Convention for the Protection of the Audiovisual Heritage, on the Protection of Television Productions	8-Nov-2001	1-Apr-2014	yes	yes	yes
185	Budapest Convention on Cybercrime	23-Nov-2001	1-Jul-2004	yes	yes	no
186	Additional Protocol to the Convention on Human Rights and Biomedicine concerning Transplantation of Organs and Tissues of Human Origin	24-Jan-2002	1-May-2006	yes	yes	yes
187	Protocol No. 13 to the Convention for the Protection of Human Rights and Fundamental Freedoms, concerning the abolition of the death penalty in all circumstances	3-May-2002	1-Jul-2003	no	no	no
188	Additional Protocol to the Anti-Doping Convention	12-Sep-2002	1-Apr-2004	yes	yes	no
189	Additional Protocol to the Convention on Cybercrime, concerning the criminalisation of acts of a racist and xenophobic nature committed through computer systems	28-Jan-2003	1-Mar-2006	yes	yes	no
190	Protocol amending the European Convention on the Suppression of Terrorism	15-May-2003		no	no	no
191	Additional Protocol to the Criminal Law Convention on Corruption	15-May-2003	1-Feb-2005	yes	yes	yes
192	Convention on Contact concerning Children	15-May-2003	1-Sep-2005	yes	yes	yes
193	European Convention for the Protection of Animals during International Transport (Revised)	6-Nov-2003	14-Mar-2006	yes	yes	yes
194	Protocol No. 14 to the Convention for the Protection of Human Rights and Fundamental Freedoms, amending the control system of the Convention	13-May-2004	1-Jun-2010	no	no	no
195	Additional Protocol to the Convention on Human Rights and Biomedicine, concerning Biomedical Research	25-Jan-2005	1-Sep-2007	yes	yes	yes
196	Council of Europe Convention on the Prevention of Terrorism	16-May-2005	1-Jun-2007	yes	yes	yes
197	Council of Europe Convention on Action against Trafficking in Human Beings	16-May-2005	1-Feb-2008	yes	yes	yes
198	Council of Europe Convention on Laundering, Search, Seizure and Confiscation of the Proceeds from Crime and on the Financing of Terrorism	16-May-2005	1-May-2008	yes	yes	yes
199	Council of Europe Framework Convention on the Value of Cultural Heritage for Society	27-Oct-2005	1-Jun-2011	yes	yes	yes
200	Council of Europe Convention on the avoidance of statelessness in relation to State succession	19-May-2006	1-May-2009	yes	yes	no
201	Council of Europe Convention on the Protection of Children against Sexual Exploitation and Sexual Abuse	25-Oct-2007	1-Jul-2010	yes	yes	yes
202	European Convention on the Adoption of Children (Revised)	27-Nov-2008	1-Sep-2011	yes	yes	no
203	Additional Protocol to the Convention on Human Rights and Biomedicine concerning Genetic Testing for Health Purposes	27-Nov-2008		yes	yes	yes
204	Protocol No. 14bis to the Convention for the Protection of Human Rights and Fundamental Freedoms	27-May-2009	1-Oct-2009	no	no	no
205	Council of Europe Convention on Access to Official Documents	18-Jun-2009		yes	yes	yes
206	Protocol No. 3 to the European Outline Convention on Transfrontier Co-operation between Territorial Communities or Authorities concerning Euroregional Co-operation Groupings (ECGs)	16-Nov-2009	1-Mar-2013	yes	no	no
207	Additional Protocol to the European Charter of Local Self-Government on the right to participate in the affairs of a local authority	16-Nov-2009	1-Jun-2012	no	no	no
208	Protocol amending the Convention on Mutual Administrative Assistance in Tax Matters	27-May-2010	1-Jun-2011	yes	yes	no
209	Third Additional Protocol to the European Convention on Extradition	10-Nov-2010	1-May-2012	yes	yes	no
210	Council of Europe Convention on preventing and combating violence against women and domestic violence	11-May-2011	1-Aug-2014	yes	yes	yes
211	Council of Europe Convention on the counterfeiting of medical products and similar crimes involving threats to public health	28-Oct-2011	1-Jan-2016	yes	yes	yes
212	Fourth Additional Protocol to the European Convention on Extradition	20-Sep-2012	1-Jun-2014	yes	yes	no
213	Protocol No. 15 amending the Convention for the Protection of Human Rights and Fundamental Freedoms	24-Jun-2013	1-August-2018	no	no	yes
214	Protocol No. 16 to the Convention for the Protection of Human Rights and Fundamental Freedoms	2-Oct-2013	1-August-2018	no	no	yes
215	Council of Europe Convention on the Manipulation of Sports Competitions	18-Sep-2014	1-September-2019	yes	yes	yes
216	Council of Europe Convention against Trafficking in Human Organs	25-Mar-2015	1-March-2018	yes	yes	yes
217	Additional Protocol to the Council of Europe Convention on the Prevention of Terrorism	22-Oct-2015	1-July-2021	yes	yes	yes
218	Council of Europe Convention on an Integrated Safety, Security and Service Approach at Football Matches and Other Sports Events	3-Jul-2016	1-November-2017	yes	yes	no
219	Protocol amending the European Landscape Convention	1-Aug-2016	1-July-2021	yes	no	no
220	Council of Europe Convention on Cinematographic Co-Production (revised)	30-Jan-2017	1-Oct-2017	yes	yes	yes
221	Council of Europe Convention on Offences relating to Cultural Property	19-May-2017	1-April-2022	yes	yes	no
222	Protocol amending the Additional Protocol to the Convention on the Transfer of Sentenced Persons	22-Nov-2017		yes	yes	yes
223	Protocol amending the Convention for the Protection of Individuals with regard to Automatic Processing of Personal Data	10-Oct-2018		yes	yes	no
224	Second Additional Protocol to the Convention on Cybercrime on enhanced co-operation and disclosure of electronic evidence	12-May-2022		yes	yes	no
225	Council of Europe Framework Convention on Artificial Intelligence and Human Rights, Democracy and the Rule of Law	5-September-2024		yes	yes	yes
226	Council of Europe Convention for the Protection of the Profession of Lawyer	13-May-2025		yes	yes	yes
227	Third Additional Protocol to the European Convention on Mutual Assistance in Criminal Matters	19-September-2025		yes	yes	no
228	Council of Europe Convention on the Protection of the Environment through Criminal Law	3-December-2025		yes	yes	yes
229	Convention establishing an International Claims Commission for Ukraine	16-December-2025		yes	yes	yes
