= European Convention =

Several bodies or treaties are known as European Convention.

== Bodies of the European Union ==
- European Convention (1999–2000) which drafted the:
  - Charter of Fundamental Rights of the European Union (2000 / 2009)
- Convention on the Future of Europe (2001–2003) which drafted the:
  - Treaty establishing a Constitution for Europe (2004), rewritten into the Treaty of Lisbon (2007 / 2009)

== A body for amending the Treaties of the European Union ==
- European Convention, called to draft a new or amend an existing Treaty of the European Union, uniquely composed of representatives of the national Parliaments, of the Heads of State or Government of the Member States, of the European Parliament and of the commission, as regulated in the Art. 48 (3) of the Treaty on European Union (Lisbon Treaty)

== European treaties ==
The most known one is the:

- European Convention on Human Rights (ECHR), formally: European Convention for the Protection of Human Rights and Fundamental Freedoms, a human rights treaty (1950 / 1953)

Other treaties or organizations include:

- European Convention for Constructional Steelwork (ECCS)
- European Convention for the Protection of Pet Animals
- European Convention on Bioethics
- European Convention on Cinematographic Co-production
- European Convention on Extradition
- European Convention on Information on Foreign Law
- European Convention on International Commercial Arbitration
- European Convention on Mutual Assistance in Criminal Matters
- European Convention on Nationality
- European Convention on Recognition and Enforcement of Decisions concerning Custody of Children and on Restoration of Custody of Children (1980–1983)
- European Convention on Social and Medical Assistance
- European Convention on State Immunity
- European Convention on the Calculation of Time-Limits
- European Convention on the Equivalence of Diplomas leading to Admission to Universities
- European Convention on the Profession of Lawyer (CCBE)
- European Convention on the Protection of the Archaeological Heritage
- European Convention on the Recognition of the Legal Personality of International Non-Governmental Organisations
- European Convention relating to the Formalities required for Patent Applications

== See also ==
- List of Council of Europe treaties
