= European Convention on the Legal Status of Children born out of Wedlock =

1975 Council of Europe treaty

- Signed: 15 October 1975
- Location: Strasbourg
- Effective: 11 August 1978
- Condition: 3 ratifications
- Parties: 26
- Ratifiers: 23
- Depositary: Secretary General of the Council of Europe
- Citations: ETS 85
- Languages: English; French

The European Convention on the Legal Status of Children born out of Wedlock is a treaty (E.T.S. No. 85) adopted in 1975 under the auspices of the Council of Europe to harmonise the legal status of children born out of wedlock, and promote their equality with children born in wedlock, in the relevant legislation of the Contracting Parties. Accession is open to CoE Member States. As of 2024, it has been signed by 26 countries, and ratified by 23 countries. The Convention imposes an obligation on the Member States to eliminate discriminatory treatment of children born out of wedlock. The Council purposefully uses the term children born out of wedlock instead of illegitimate children. Historically, it is the first adopted multilateral treaty of this type.

== Background ==
The status of children born outside of wedlock is, indirectly, or directly, also treated in provisions of the European Convention on Human Rights (Articles 8, 12 and 14), the European Social Charter (Articles 16, 17), the and the European Convention on Nationality (Articles 5, 6).

The convention is one of the early, significant instruments in family law, especially on matters involving children, of the Council of Europe. The convention is a part of a set of other Council Treaties on matters involving children: the European Convention on the Adoption of Children, the European Convention on Recognition and Enforcement of Decisions Concerning Custody of Children and on Restoration of Custody of Children, the European Convention on the Exercise of Children's Rights, the Convention on Contact concerning Children, the Council of Europe Convention on the Protection of Children against Sexual Exploitation and Sexual Abuse. The Parliamentary Assembly of the Council of Europe, and the Committee of Ministers of the Council of Europe, have also adopted a slew of recommendations. Three committees deal with the legal protection of children, in part or in full: Committee of Experts on Family Law (CJ-FA) – the most relevant – Convention Committee on the Custody Convention (T-CC), and the Committee of Experts on Nationality (CJ-NA) Other bodies of the Council concerned with this area of the law are the Conference of European Ministers of Justice, and the European Conference on Family Law. Additionally, some of the council's Colloquies on European law have been devoted to family law.

== History ==
European jurisdictions had recognised the concept of legitimate and illegitimate children, who had different legal status, and rights. This started to change through the rulings of the European Court of Human Rights (ECHR), and the legislative work of the council. This occurred concurrently with national reforms intended to reduce or eliminate inequalities between children born out of wedlock and children born in wedlock, and to abolish the distinction between legitimate and illegitimate children.

Germany adopted the Law on the Legal Status of Children Born out of Wedlock/Children Born outside Marriage (Legal Status) in 1969, or Non-marriage Law, for short. The Law on Family Matters of 16 December 1997 further enhanced the legal protections, but a disadvantage remained with regard to illegitimate children born before 1949. Even if recognized, those children could not be their statutory heirs. This led to the case Brauer v. Germany in 2009, which overturned this inequality.

Less expansive measures were also introduced by the Law of January 3, 1972 on Filiation in France, which allows mothers to recognise children born out of wedlock, although it required a legal formality. Only in the 21st century was the principle of equality fully upheld (through Act no. 2002-305 of 4 March 2002, removing mention of illegitimacy – filiation légitime and filiation naturell; and through Law no. 2009-61 of 16 January 2009). In 2001, France was forced in Mazurek v. France by the ECHR to change several laws that were deemed discriminatory, and in 2013 the Court ruled in Fabris v. France that these changes must also be applied to children born before 2001.

In the United Kingdom, discriminating treatment regarding illegitimate children by the common law progressed for a long time. Under English law, the child was considered filius nullius, that is, noone's child, and a bastard. As a result, the United States, Canada and Australia followed suit. In time, the traditional rule concerning these children was discarded, but an unmarried father could only acquire parental rights through specific means enumerated by Children Act 1989. These means were, basically, marriage or a court order.6 Eventually, with the Children Act 2004, parental responsibility was given to all those unmarried fathers who registered the birth of their children on the basis of a formal agreement with the mother.

Originally, because of the stigma related to birth outside of wedlock, the EConvHR was not interpreted in such a way to protect the rights of children born outside of wedlock, but this changed through landmark decisions of the Court, beginning in 1979 with the case Marckx v. Belgium. The illegitimate child was Alexandra Marckx, daughter of Paula Marckx. The Belgian Civil Code recognised no legal bond between an unmarried woman and her child from the mere fact of the birth. Article 8 of the EConvHR makes no distinction between legitimate and illegitimate children. This confirmed that the protection of family life out of marriage had to be extended so as to give children born out of wedlock the same inheritance rights, between parents and child, involving other relatives, and between grandparents and grandchildren.

In 1970, the question of legal status was discussed by the Committee of Ministers in the Intergovernmental Work Programme of the Council of Europe. This was recommended by the European Committee on Legal Co-operation (CCJ), and noted improvements in legislation. The Committee adopted Resolution (70) 15 on 15 May 1970, on the social protection of unmarried mothers and their children, which touched upon some legal aspects of the protection of children born out of wedlock. The Committee opened the convention to signature at their 249th meeting, of October 1975.

== Core normative provisions ==
The Convention seeks to assimilate the status of children, and to contribute to the harmonisation of the laws. However, Article 14 provides for a system of reservations enabling gradual implementation. The convention's main provisions relate to paternal and maternal affiliation, recognition, denial and contesting of paternity, the assignment of parental responsibilities, and children's succession rights. Under this convention, both parents have the same obligation to maintain their children as if these children were born in wedlock. Children have the same right of succession in the estate of their parents and a member of their parent's family as if they had been born in wedlock.

However, Article 14 provides for a system of reservations similar to the European Convention on Adoption, requiring reservations to be re-examined every five years, for States who cannot immediately implement certain provisions. The convention also does not cover all questions, such as whether retrospective effect should be applied after the establishment of parental affiliation, or the child's legitimation by marriage.

The Convention sets off some basic principles dealing with the establishment of children's status, as follows:

=== Article 2 ===
The maternal affiliation of every child born out of wedlock shall be based solely on the fact of the birth of the child. Where the mother is unknown, the maternal affiliation would only come into full effect when the identity becomes known. In some States, maternal affiliation is established when further information is included about the mother in the relevant documents, and they may make reservations. The International Commission of Civil Status (ICCS) relating to the establishment of maternal affiliation of natural children of 12 September 1962 can only be an intermediate stage in relation to the convention. This holds the principle of mater semper certa est to be absolute.

=== Article 3 ===
The paternal affiliation of every child born out of wedlock may be evidenced or established by voluntary recognition or by judicial decision. The internal law shall determine the form of voluntary recognition. This can be a declaration on the birth certificate or other official document.

=== Article 4 ===
The voluntary recognition of paternity may not be opposed or contested, unless the person seeking to recognise or having recognised the child is not the biological father.

=== Article 5 ===
Scientific evidence which may help to establish or disprove paternity shall be admissible.

=== Article 6 ===
The parents of a child born out of wedlock shall have the same obligation to maintain the child. The content, the extent, the duration, of this obligation are left to the internal law establishing the rules likewise for children born in wedlock.

=== Article 7 ===
Where the affiliation to both parents has been established, parental authority may not be attributed automatically only to the father. This provision does not prevent the parental authority from being attributed jointly, or to a third party, or to take away parental authority from one of the parents.

=== Article 8 ===
Where a parent does not have parental authority over or the custody of the child, that parent may obtain a right of access to the child in appropriate cases. The exercise of this right to access would be granted or refused by a judicial or administrative authority.

=== Article 9 ===
A child born out of wedlock shall have the same right of succession, as if it had been born in wedlock.

=== Article 10 ===
The marriage between the father and mother of a child born out of wedlock shall confer on the child the legal status of a child born in wedlock. It was agreed that this assimilation need not be automatic but could be subject to a judicial or administrative authority establishing that the conditions have been fulfilled. It was understood that the Convention does not forbid a Contracting Party from providing, by its internal law, a single legal status for all children and also does not forbid this party from taking special measures of protection for those children who do not live with their parents.

== Status ==
As of 2024, these are the Parties to the convention within the CoE:

Status of European Convention on the Legal Status of Children born out of Wedlock
Signatory	Signed	Ratified	In force	Reservations and declarations
Albania	✓	✓	✓	
Andorra				
Armenia				
Austria	✓	✓	✓	(Note: In pursuance of Article 14 § 1 of the Convention, the Republic of Austria reserves the right not to accord to a child born out of wedlock, as provided for in Article 9 of the Convention, the same right of succession in the estate of its father and of a member of its father’s family, as if it had been born in wedlock. (This reservation has not been renewed since 1990))
Azerbaijan				
Belgium				
Bosnia and Herzegovina				
Bulgaria				
Croatia				
Cyprus	✓	✓	✓	
Czech Republic	✓	✓	✓	(Note: In accordance with Article 1 of the European Convention on the Legal Status of Children born out of Wedlock, done in Strasbourg on 15 October 1975, the Czech Republic states that the Czech Law governing the legal status of children born out of wedlock fully conforms to the provisions of the Convention.)
Denmark	✓	✓	✓	(Note: In conformity with the provisions of Article 13, paragraph 1, the Convention shall not apply to the Faroe Islands and Greenland.)
Estonia				
Finland				
France	✓			
Georgia	✓	✓	✓	
Germany				
Greece	✓	✓	✓	
Hungary				
Iceland	✓			
Ireland	✓	✓	✓	
Italy	✓			(Note: The provisions of Article 4 of the Convention shall not preclude the application of different domestic Italian rules governing the subject. As regards Article 8 of the Convention, the right of access may not be granted to a person who no longer has parental authority over the minor as a result of the adoption of the latter by a third party. (At the time of signature))
Latvia	✓	✓	✓	
Liechtenstein	✓	✓	✓	(Note: The laws of Liechtenstein, which do not exclude the making of objections to voluntary recognition by a person who is the biological father, are reserved. (Reservation withdrawn in 1998) The laws of Liechtenstein, which do not grant in every case, with regard to the spouse, the same right of succession to children born out of wedlock as to children born in wedlock, are reserved. (Reservation withdrawn in 1998) The Principality of Liechtenstein declares that Articles 9 and 10 of the Convention shall not be interpreted in such a way as to grant to a child born out of wedlock a right to ascend the throne. This right can only be transmitted to a specific category of heirs.)
Lithuania	✓	✓	✓	
Luxembourg	✓	✓	✓	(Note: In pursuance of Article 14, paragraph 1, the Luxembourg Government reserves the right to apply Article 2 of the Convention in such a way that maternal affiliation follows automatically only from indication of the mother's name on the child's birth certificate, provided however that maternal affiliation may nevertheless be established judicially by means of a maternal affiliation suit if it is proved by due legal process that the child concerned is the one to whom the alleged mother gave birth.(At the time of signature))
Malta				
Moldova	✓	✓	✓	(Note: In accordance with Article 13, paragraph 1, of the Convention, the Republic of Moldova declares that it will not be bound by the provisions of the Convention with respect to the territory actually controlled by the local authorities of the self-proclaimed Trans-Dniester Republic until the final settlement of the conflict in this region.)
Monaco				
Montenegro				
Netherlands				
North Macedonia	✓	✓	✓	
Norway	✓	✓	✓	
Poland	✓	✓	✓	
Portugal	✓	✓	✓	
Romania		✓	✓	(Note: On 16 September 1992, the date on which, by virtue of Act No. 101, Romania acceded to the European Convention on the Legal Status of Children Born out of Wedlock, domestic Romanian legislation contained no regulations at variance with the provisions of the Convention. The main legal rules in force date from 1953 and are included in the Family Code. They satisfy a fundamental principle governing the regulations on the legal and social status of children as a whole, explicitly recognised in Article 44 (3) of the Constitution which specifies that "illegitimate children enjoy equality with legitimate children under the law".)
Russia (Note: On 25 February 2022 the Council of Europe suspended Russia's membership in the organization due to Russia's invasion of Ukraine. On 15 March, Russia announced the start of the process of withdrawal from the organization. On 16 March the Committee of Ministers of the Council of Europe decided to immediately expel Russia for armed aggression against Ukraine.)				
San Marino				
Serbia				
Slovakia				
Slovenia				
Spain				
Sweden	✓	✓	✓	
Switzerland	✓	✓	✓	
Turkey				
Ukraine	✓	✓	✓	(Note: The Permanent Representation of Ukraine to the Council of Europe presents its compliments to the Secretary General of the Council of Europe and has the honour to convey hereby, on behalf of the Government of Ukraine, the list of international treaties concerning international cooperation within the Council of Europe, signed/ratified by Ukraine, as well as to inform about the impossibility to guarantee the implementation by the Ukrainian Side in full of its obligations under the above mentioned international treaties of Ukraine for the period of the armed aggression of the Russian Federation against Ukraine and introduction of martial law on the territory of Ukraine, until full termination of the infringement of the sovereignty, territorial integrity and inviolability of borders of Ukraine.)
United Kingdom	✓	✓	✓	(Note: In accordance with Article 14, paragraph 1 of the said Convention, the Government of the United Kingdom reserves the right, in relation to England and Wales, to apply Article 9 only in relation to the estates of the father and mother of a child born out of wedlock.(This reservation has not been renewed since 2001) In accordance with Article 14, paragraph 1, of the Convention, the Government of the United Kingdom reserve the right, in relation to England and Wales and Northern Ireland, to apply Article 9 only in relation to the estates of the father and mother of a child born out of wedlock. (This reservation has not been renewed since 1996) The Convention shall extend to the Isle of Man with effect from 1 January 1986. Article 6, paragraph 1, of the Convention shall not apply to the Isle of Man. (This reservation has not been renewed since 1991) In accordance with Article 14, paragraph 1, of the Convention, the Government of the United Kingdom reserve the right not to apply Article 6, paragraph 1 of the Convention in relation to England and Wales. (This reservation has not been renewed since 1991) In accordance with Article 14, paragraph 1, of the Convention, the Government of the United Kingdom reserve the right not to apply Article 6, paragraph 1 of the Convention in relation to Northern Ireland. (This reservation has not been renewed since 1996) In accordance with Article 14, paragraph 1, of the Convention, the Government of the United Kingdom reserve the right not to apply Article 6, paragraph 2 in relation to Scotland. (This reservation has not been renewed since 1991)) (Note: In accordance with Article 14, paragraph 1, of the Convention, the Government of the United Kingdom reserve the right to apply Article 9 only in relation to the estates of the father and mother of a child born out of wedlock. (This reservation has not been renewed since 1991) In accordance with Article 13, paragraph 2, of the Convention, the Government of the United Kingdom hereby declares that the Convention shall extend to the Bailiwick of Guernsey, Herm and Jethou. In accordance with Article 14, paragraph 1, of the Convention, the Government of the United Kingdom hereby declares that Article 9 shall apply in Guernsey, Herm and Jethou only in relation to the testate succession in the estate of a father or mother of a child born out of wedlock. (This reservation has not been renewed since 2006) The Government of the United Kingdom also wish to declare their understanding that neither Article 9 nor Article 10 of the Convention is to be interpreted as conferring upon a child born out of wedlock any right of succession to the Crown or a title of honour or any right of inheritance to an entailed interest. (This reservation has not been renewed since 2006))

== Impact ==
=== Rulings of the European Court of Human Rights ===
The court determined in the case of Inze v. Austria, in 1987, that the applicant, who is a child born out of wedlock, must be legally heir to his mother's farm, on which he had worked until the age of 23. A violation of Article 14 of the EconvHR, and Article 1 of the Additional Protocols was found. Austria's reservation was determined to not be relevant to the case, as it only applied to the estate of the father and the father's family.

=== Further developments ===
The 6th Conference on Family Law took place in Strasbourg on 14 and 15 October 2002 on the theme of “The legal protection of the family in matters of succession”. The legal protection is important due to various reservations made by States to Article 9.

In 2011, a Draft Recommendation on the rights and legal status of children and parental responsibilities was written.
