= Strasbourg Convention =

Strasbourg Convention may refer to:

- The 1963 Convention on the Unification of Certain Points of Substantive Law on Patents for Invention
- The 1963 Convention on the Reduction of Cases of Multiple Nationality and on Military Obligations in Cases of Multiple Nationality
- The 1967 European Convention on the Adoption of Children
- The 1977 Convention on Products Liability in regard to Personal Injury and Death
- The 1981 Convention for the Protection of Individuals with regard to Automatic Processing of Personal Data
- The 1983 Convention on the Transfer of Sentenced Persons
- The 1990 CETS141 (Convention on Laundering, Search, Seizure and Confiscation of the Proceeds from Crime)
- The 1997 European Convention on Nationality
- The 1997 European Convention on the Suppression of Terrorism

== See also ==
- Strasbourg Agreement (disambiguation)
- Strasbourg
