= Ukrainian nationality law =

On Citizenship of Ukraine Про громадянство України

Verkhovna Rada
- Citation: 2235-III
- Territorial extent: Ukraine
- Passed by: 3rd Verkhovna Rada
- Passed: 18 January 2001
- Signed by: President of Ukraine
- Commenced: 1 March 2001

Related legislation
- Constitution of Ukraine
- Status: Amended

Ukrainian nationality law details the conditions by which a person holds nationality of Ukraine. The primary law governing these requirements is the law "On Citizenship of Ukraine", which came into force on 1 March 2001. In June 2025, Ukraine legalized multiple citizenship.

Any person born to at least one Ukrainian parent automatically receives Ukrainian citizenship at birth. Foreign nationals may naturalize after legally residing in the country for at least five years and demonstrating proficiency in the Ukrainian language.

Ukraine was previously a constituent republic of the Soviet Union and local residents were Soviet citizens. Following the dissolution of the Soviet Union in 1991, all post-Soviet states established separate citizenship laws. Although Ukrainians no longer hold Soviet citizenship, they remain eligible for facilitated naturalisation or a change of nationality in some other former Soviet republics.

== Terminology ==
The distinction between the meaning of the terms citizenship and nationality is not always clear in the English language and differs by country. Generally, nationality refers a person's legal belonging to a state and is the common term used in international treaties when referring to members of a state; citizenship refers to the set of rights and duties a person has in that nation.

In the Soviet context, nationality was used to describe ethnicity rather than the population of a state. Soviet citizenship law was extremely permissive and allowed virtually any person in the world to become a Soviet citizen with no specific requirements. Union Republics in the late Soviet era used differing methods to delineate their new national constituencies, based largely on the majority ethnic composition of that polity. The post-Soviet Ukrainian definition of national membership relies on a link to the territorial bounds of the modern state by birth, permanent residence, or close family connection. Any person who fell within that definition became part of the Ukrainian nation.

== History ==
=== Ukraine under Imperial Russia ===
Following the Third Partition of Poland in 1795, nearly all of Ruthenia (modern-day Ukraine) fell under control of the Russian Empire. The region was incorporated into the empire as "Little Russia". During this time, there were no general requirements to become a Russian subject other than becoming christened by the Russian Orthodox Church and swearing an oath of personal fealty to the Russian monarch.

Provincial governments held wide discretion in determining who could naturalize as Russian subjects until 10 February 1864, when the imperial government introduced a five-year residence requirement and shifted authority over naturalization from provincial authorities to the Ministry of Internal Affairs of the Russian Empire. The residence requirement could be reduced for individuals who performed an extraordinary service for the Russian state, were especially talented or highly skilled in a scientific field, or made significant investments in the empire. The term "citizenship" became introduced in this reform as a different name for the concept of subjecthood.

Russian women who married foreign men automatically lost Russian subject status. A formerly Russian widow or divorcée who lost had her Russian subject status through marriage could petition a provincial authority for restoration of that status. Other Russian subjects could separately apply for the end of their subjecthood through the Ministry of Internal Affairs with approval from the Emperor. Any person who became a foreign subject or citizen without prior government approval could be punished by the deprivation of their rights or banishment to Siberia.

=== Revolutionary Ukraine ===
The Ukrainian People's Republic (UPR) established Ukrainian citizenship for the first time when it adopted citizenship laws on 2 and 4 March 1918, just as Soviet Russia recognized the UPR's independence under the Treaty of Brest-Litovsk. The laws instituted jus soli, prohibited dual citizenship, and required "registration of citizenship through the process of proving one's right to citizenship through witnesses." The legislation was vulnerable to "undemocratic" abuse, and many provisions were "incorrectly formulated" so as to make compliance impossible. Therefore, the Central Council planned a revision.

The German-backed Ukrainian State seized control in April and adopted a law based on the UPR's proposed changes on 2 July. This law claimed as citizens all Russian subjects who resided in Ukraine and did not formally reject Ukrainian citizenship. The UPR resumed power in December. The autonomous Western Oblast of the UPR, whose territory remained in dispute with Poland, saw citizenship legislation enacted on 8 April 1919. This law likewise conferred citizenship on everyone who belonged to one of the oblast's communities and who did not reject it.

Poland occupied most of the Western Oblast's territory by July, and the UPR recognized the territory as part of Poland in April 1920. In September of the same year, the Ministry of Internal Affairs of the UPR, then in exile in Tarnów, stated in a letter that the Ukrainian State citizenship law remained valid. By November, the UPR had decisively lost the last of its territory, which was divided in 1921 between Poland, Soviet Russia, and the Ukrainian SSR.

=== Constituent Soviet republic ===
The Ukrainian Soviet Socialist Republic became a founding member of the Soviet Union (USSR) in 1922. Citizenship regulations were restructured under the authority of the All-Union government following adoption of the 1924 Constitution of the Soviet Union. Every person living within the borders of the USSR was a Soviet citizen unless they declared themselves as foreign citizens. Soviet citizens also held citizenship of the Union Republic in which they were permanently resident, although republican citizenship was symbolic and held no substantive meaning. Standard regulations in other countries required wives and children to hold the same citizenship as the male head of the family. Soviet legislation deviated from the contemporary international norm and allowed Soviet women who married foreign men to retain their Soviet citizenship after marriage. Any imperial Russian subjects who had permanently departed the Russian Empire before 7 November 1917 and had acquired foreign citizenship or applied for such status were deprived of Russian/Soviet citizenship by decree in 1933.

The first piece of legislation governing solely on the issue of citizenship was the 1938 Soviet Citizenship Law, which provided a redefinition for who held Soviet citizenship. Unlike previous regulations which automatically granted citizenship to virtually all residents of the USSR, this law defined Soviet citizens as anybody who had been a Russian subject at the time of the founding of the Russian Soviet Federative Socialist Republic in 1917 and had not subsequently lost Soviet citizenship, as well as those who had otherwise lawfully obtained citizenship. All other people resident in the USSR who neither held Soviet citizenship nor could prove foreign citizenship were treated as stateless persons. Citizenship could be deprived under this law as part of a court decision or by decree of the Presidium of the Supreme Soviet. All Soviet Jews who permanently migrated to Israel were stripped of Soviet citizenship by decree beginning in 1967.

Following adoption of the 1977 Constitution of the Soviet Union, which established the principle that all Soviet citizens would enjoy protection abroad from the Soviet government, a new citizenship law was enacted on 1 December 1978. This law prohibited the extradition of Soviet citizens to any foreign jurisdiction and formally barred holding multiple citizenships. Citizenship was held to be a unique relationship between a citizen and country, and any deviation from that was considered a violation of loyalty to the state, which led to a potential deprivation of citizenship. A 1981 Ukrainian Supreme Soviet decree allowed foreign citizens to acquire republican citizenship of the Ukrainian SSR (and consequently Soviet citizenship) but contained no mechanism for existing Soviet citizens to convert their existing republican citizenships.

During the reform period of glasnost and perestroika, Soviet citizenship law was revised for a final time in 1990. The modified legislation transferred responsibility for citizenship deprivation from the Presidium of the Supreme Soviet to the President of the Soviet Union and greatly limited the circumstances in which this power would be exercised. Soviet citizenship could now only be deprived from individuals who enlisted in foreign militaries or other governmental bodies, permanently lived abroad and failed to register at a Soviet consulate for at least five years, or had fraudulently acquired citizenship.

=== Transition and immediate post-Soviet period ===
In the waning days of the Union, the Ukrainian SSR adopted the Declaration of State Sovereignty of Ukraine, which established a separate citizenship from that of the Union. Requirements for this status were detailed in the 1991 citizenship law that defined the initial citizenry of the new state. Debate over this legislation in the Supreme Soviet was split between the nationalists and anti-reform communists. While the nationalists saw the future Ukrainian nation as a multinational state with a foundational core of ethnic Ukrainian citizens, the communists subscribed to a single pan-East Slavic identity that consisted of all Ukrainians, Russians, and Belarusians. The communists pushed for wording that emphasised ties to the rest of the Soviet Union, but the nationalists advocated for a stronger separation of Union and Ukrainian citizenships to accelerate the process towards independence.

Following the August Coup in Moscow and Ukraine's subsequent Declaration of Independence, the likelihood of a reformed Soviet Union diminished greatly. The communists in the Verkhovna Rada shifted towards supporting dual citizenship to facilitate the maintenance of close political ties with Russia and the possibility of a future union state. However, the nationalists feared that the extension of Russian jurisdiction over Ukrainians through citizenship would undermine Ukraine's newfound independence. A motion to add provisions allowing dual citizenship failed by only two votes in the legislature. The final version of the citizenship law that became effective on 13 November 1991 stated that dual citizenship would be allowed on bilateral agreement with another country, but no such treaty was ever signed. Having come into force prior to the dissolution of the Soviet Union, this law retained a provision that explicitly gave Ukrainian citizens the right to retain Soviet citizenship.

Any person who was a permanent resident of Ukraine and held no other citizenship automatically became Ukrainian citizens on 13 November 1991. Individuals who were born in the country, or whose parent or grandparent was born in Ukraine, were also eligible to acquire citizenship. Overseas residents who were employed in government service or studying abroad and were born or otherwise permanently resident in Ukraine could register as Ukrainian citizens within one year of the law's effective date (this deadline was extended several times until 31 December 1999). Registration eligibility was later expanded in 1997 to include any person who was not domiciled in Ukraine on 13 November 1991 but was born or permanently resident in the country and held no other foreign nationality. Any descendants of someone who registered as a Ukrainian citizen also received citizenship as part of this provision. Qualified individuals who failed to register by the end of 1999 nevertheless continue to be eligible for a facilitated acquisition of citizenship with no residence or language requirements.

==== Citizenship arrangements with other former Soviet states ====
As a result of the Soviet Union's collapse, large numbers of ethnic Russians became resident outside the boundaries of the Russian state. In order to give this population and other former Soviet citizens an opportunity to choose the country of their new affiliation, visa-free movement was established throughout the Commonwealth of Independent States (CIS) in 1992. Part of Russia's objectives in pursuing dual citizenship agreements with CIS member states in the 1990s was to provide Russians residing in the former Soviet Union with some sense of security from the Russian state so that they would be less likely to resettle in Russia during that period of prolonged economic crisis and restructuring. Ukraine and the other post-Soviet states were wary of Russia's intentions with extending citizenship to people within their borders and did not want to further expose themselves to Russian influence. Despite some support within the Russian State Duma for automatically extending Russian citizenship to all former Soviet citizens, the legislature ultimately rejected this to prevent causing unnecessary tension. The agreement on CIS-wide free movement later expired in 2000.

Ukraine and Russia attempted several times to negotiate a dual citizenship arrangement during the 1990s and in 2004 but these ultimately ended with no agreement. Ukraine's non-recognition of dual citizenship was instead reinforced in domestic law by a 1996 constitutional amendment that stated the country's adherence to a single citizenship doctrine. A 1997 change to the citizenship law further removed the clause that allowed dual citizenship through bilateral agreement with another country.

Rather than endorse a dual citizenship scheme, Ukraine signed bilateral agreements in the late 1990s and 2000s that simplified the process of changing citizenships with Belarus, Georgia, Kazakhstan, Kyrgyzstan, Tajikistan, and Uzbekistan. These treaties were concluded with the intention of preventing statelessness and dual citizenship. A person who had a close relative born or resident in a contracting state could acquire the citizenship of that other country and would automatically renounce that of their original state. These agreements had a marked effect on the return of formerly deported Crimean Tatars. Although about 150,000 former deportees had returned to Ukraine by 1991 and automatically became Ukrainian citizens at independence, those who entered the country after 1991 and had cancelled propiska in their previous country of residence effectively became stateless. The bilateral naturalisation agreements allowed a further 112,000 returnees to become Ukrainian citizens. Although proposed by Ukraine, Russia declined to participate in a similar bilateral arrangement.

=== Policies in independent Ukraine ===
Ukraine's 2001 revision of its citizenship law further expanded access to citizenship. Registration eligibility was expanded to include any person who had a grandparent, parent, or full siblings born or domiciled in the country before 16 June 1990 provided that they renounced any other nationalities they possessed within one year of registration. Individuals with half-siblings born or resident in the country also could register beginning in 2005, and the post-registration renunciation requirement was extended to two years as well. Former Soviet citizens permanently settled in Ukraine after 13 November 1991 and whose Soviet passports were stamped with "citizen of Ukraine" by Ministry of Internal Affairs officials became included in the initial post-independence definition of Ukrainian citizens. Other former Soviet citizens who held Ukrainian propiska became exempt from obtaining permanent residency before naturalising.

Although the original 1991 law largely prevented statelessness by including all permanent residents of Ukraine in the initial group of citizens, its failure to avert the same with the Crimean Tatar population prompted the involvement of the United Nations High Commissioner for Refugees, Organization for Security and Co-operation in Europe, and the Council of Europe in later revisions. In compliance with the European Convention on Nationality, the 2001 reforms established limited recognition of dual citizenship in situations where a Ukrainian involuntarily acquired another nationality. This includes any Ukrainian who acquires foreign nationality: concurrently at the time of their birth, if they are adopted by foreign citizens, and through marriage to a foreign citizen spouse. Ukraine later signed the Council of Europe Convention on the Avoidance of Statelessness in Relation to State Succession in 2006 and acceded to both the Convention Relating to the Status of Stateless Persons and Convention on the Reduction of Statelessness in 2013.

== Acquisition and loss of citizenship ==
In June 2025, Ukraine legalized multiple citizenship.

Individuals automatically receive Ukrainian citizenship at birth if at least one parent is a Ukrainian citizen, whether they are born within Ukraine or overseas. Children born in the country but do not acquire any citizenship from their parents at birth (or only acquire citizenship of a country from which a parent has fled from as a recognized refugee) are also Ukrainian citizens by birth. Abandoned children are treated as if they were born to Ukrainian parents if their origin cannot be determined. A child who is adopted by or comes under the legal guardianship of a Ukrainian citizen may also acquire citizenship.

Persons who are not citizens of Ukraine but were born or permanently resided before August 24, 1991 on the land that later became the territory of modern day Ukraine, or was part of the territory of previous Ukrainian states such as the Ukrainian People’s Republic can also claim Ukrainian citizenship on the basis of territorial origin. This right is extended to the children, grandchildren, full-blooded siblings and parents of the person who was born or resided in the territory of Ukraine before 1991.

Foreigners may naturalize as Ukrainian citizens after living in the country for a continuous period of at least five years. Applicants must have been issued an immigration permit and must demonstrate proficiency in the Ukrainian language. The residence requirement is reduced to two years if an applicant is married to a Ukrainian citizen, or if they hold refugee or asylum status. Naturalization candidates have additionally been required to pass a citizenship test since 21 April 2023.

Citizens who are permanently domiciled abroad can voluntarily relinquish their Ukrainian citizenship by making a declaration of renunciation, provided that the declarant already possesses another citizenship or a legal document from a foreign state specifying that another citizenship will be granted on the loss of their Ukrainian citizenship. Recognition of an individual's overseas residence requires the completion of an administrative process to become a legal non-resident of Ukraine. This process is typically only done when outgoing emigrants leave the country with the express intention of permanent settlement abroad and is difficult to complete for citizens who departed on non-immigrant visas. Ukrainians who did not undergo this process before settlement overseas and who no longer possess documentation for propiska (legal residency) are in practice barred from successfully renouncing Ukrainian citizenship.

Citizenship may be involuntarily deprived from naturalized persons who fraudulently acquired Ukrainian citizenship, and from those who voluntarily enter military service in another country without mandatory conscription. Loss of citizenship under these conditions does not occur automatically. The Ministry of Internal Affairs must formally present documentary evidence that individuals who fall under an applicable category already possesses a foreign nationality and all final decisions on deprivation must be approved by the President. The government rarely initiates this formal deprivation process due to its length and cost.

Between 2005 and mid-2017, 87,376 people lost Ukrainian citizenship. The vast majority of them lost citizenship voluntarily or under facilitated procedures for citizenship changes through bilateral agreements with other countries. Only 333 people were involuntarily stripped of their citizenship during this period of time.

== Multiple citizenship ==
On 18 June 2025, Ukraine Parliament approved a law to permit multiple citizenship for Ukrainians to combat demographic issues. President Volodymyr Zelenskyy introduced this bill in August 2024. Having only included five countries up until then, the list of countries whose citizens could hold dual citizenship was significantly expanded on 8 May 2026 to include 28 new states. Moldova became the 34th state on the list as it was officially announced on 26 June that year.
