= Mutual legal assistance treaty =

Treaty to enforce public or criminal laws

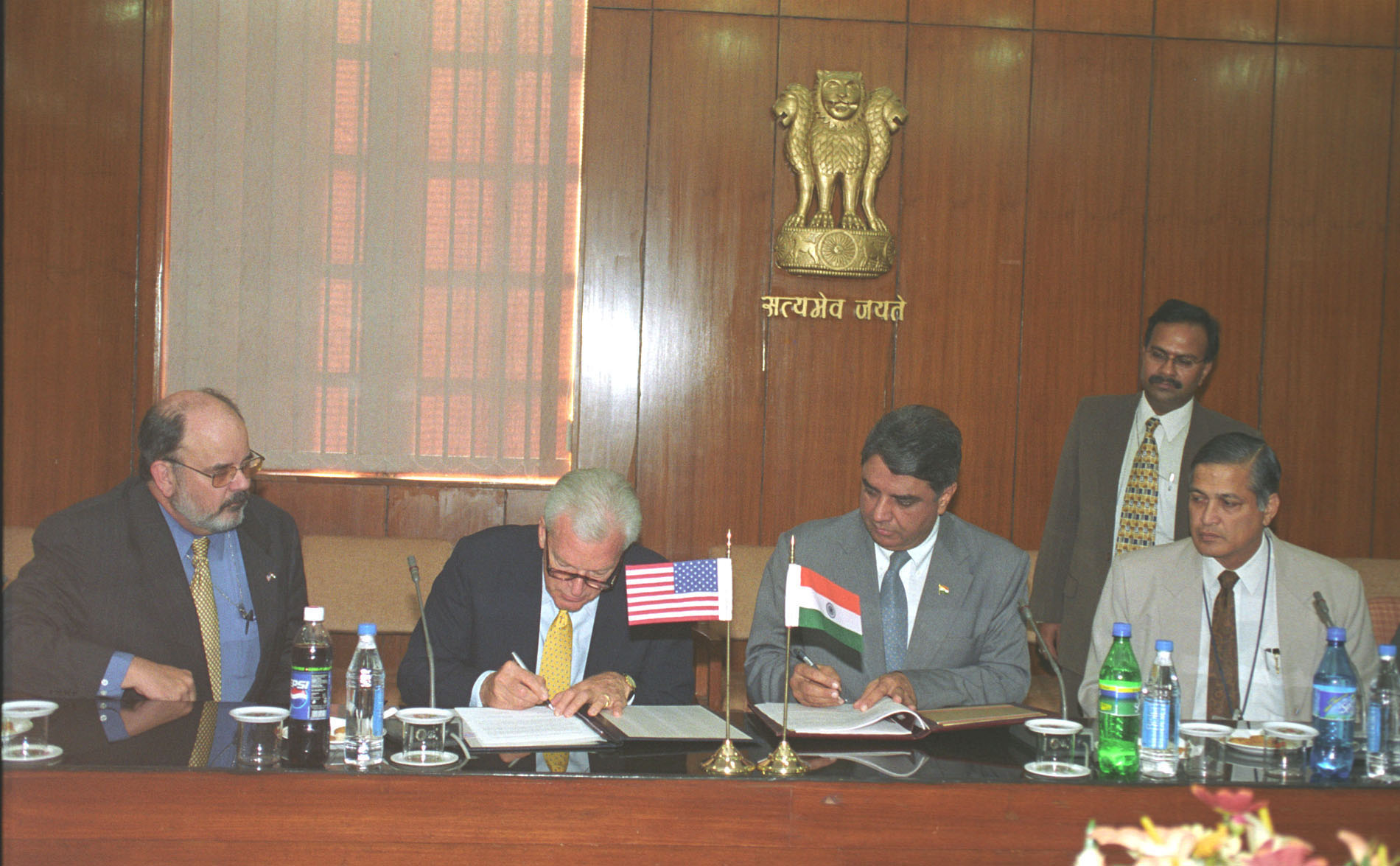
Signing of the Protocol of Exchange of the Instrument of Ratification of a MLAT between India and the United States in 2005

A mutual legal assistance treaty (MLAT) is an agreement between two or more countries for the purpose of gathering and exchanging information in an effort to enforce public or criminal laws. A mutual legal assistance request is commonly used to formally interrogate a suspect in a criminal case, when the suspect resides in a foreign country.

== Synopsis ==
Modern states have developed mechanisms for requesting and obtaining evidence for criminal investigations and prosecutions. When evidence or other forms of legal assistance, such as witness statements or the service of documents, are needed from a foreign sovereign, states may attempt to cooperate informally through their respective police agencies or, alternatively, resort to what is typically referred to as requests for “mutual legal assistance." The practice of mutual legal assistance developed from the comity-based system of letters rogatory, though it is now far more common for states to make mutual legal assistance requests directly to the designated Central Authority within each state. In contemporary practice, such requests may still be made on the basis of reciprocity but may also be made pursuant to bilateral and multilateral treaties that obligate countries to provide assistance.

This assistance may take the form of examining and identifying people, places and things, custodial transfers, and providing assistance with the immobilization of the instruments of criminal activity. With regards to the latter, MLATs between the United States and Caribbean nations do not cover U.S. tax evasion, and are therefore ineffective when applied to Caribbean countries, which usually act as offshore "tax havens".

Assistance may be denied by either country (according to agreement details) for political or security reasons, or if the criminal offence in question is not equally punishable in both countries. Some treaties may encourage assistance with legal aid for nationals in other countries.

Many countries are able to provide mutual legal assistance to other countries for a broad range of topics through their justice ministries even in the absence of a treaty, through joint investigations between law enforcement agencies in both countries, emergency disclosure requests, letters rogatory, etc. In some developing countries, however, domestic laws can actually create obstacles to effective law enforcement cooperation and mutual legal assistance.

For instance, the Convention on Mutual Administrative Assistance in Tax Matters is a convention to facilitate the entering into bilateral tax information exchange agreements between more than 90 states parties.

== Examples of multilateral MLATs ==
- Convention on Mutual Administrative Assistance in Tax Matters
- European Convention on Information on Foreign Law
- European Convention on Mutual Assistance in Criminal Matters
- European Convention on the International Validity of Criminal Judgments
- Inter-American Convention on Mutual Assistance in Criminal Matters
- United Nations Convention against Transnational Organized Crime
- Ljubljana-The Hague Convention on Mutual Legal Assistance (regarding international criminal law)

== See also ==
- United States Department of Justice
- Deportation
- Europol
- Extradition
- Interpol
- Judicial assistance
