= Agreement on the Transfer of Corpses =

1973 treaty between European nation states

- Type: Cross-border transport; health
- Signed: 26 October 1973
- Location: Strasbourg, France
- Effective: 11 November 1975
- Condition: 3 ratifications
- Signatories: 23
- Parties: 23
- Depositary: Secretary-General of the Council of Europe
- Languages: English and French

The Agreement on the Transfer of Corpses is a 1973 multilateral treaty whereby states agree to rules for the transport of human corpses across international borders. It is a treaty of the Council of Europe and as of 2013 has only been ratified by European states, but it is open to ratification by any state in the world. The Agreement was intended to replace and simplify the requirements of the 1937 International Convention on the Transport of Corpses.

== Content ==
The Agreement mandates that every corpse being transported across international borders shall be accompanied by a laissez-passer document issued by the state in which the transport begins. Transport may only be made in an impervious coffin that contains only the corpse and such personal effects as are to be buried or cremated with the corpse. If the person died of an infectious disease, the corpse must be wrapped in material that has been impregnated with an antiseptic solution. The Agreement also establishes the minimal standards for the coffins used for transporting corpses across international borders.

The Agreement does not apply to the transport of cremation ashes.

== Signature, entry into force, and ratifications ==
The Agreement was concluded in Strasbourg on 26 October 1973. Since then, it has been signed by 23 states. It entered into force on 11 November 1975 and has been ratified by the following 23 states:

- Andorra
- Austria
- Belgium
- Cyprus
- Czech Republic
- Estonia
- Finland (accession)
- France
- Greece
- Iceland
- Latvia
- Lithuania
- Luxembourg
- Moldova
- Netherlands
- Norway
- Portugal
- Slovakia
- Slovenia
- Spain
- Sweden
- Switzerland
- Turkey

Germany signed the Agreement in 1974 but has not ratified it. The most recent ratification was by the Czech Republic in February 2012.

== Relationship to 1937 Convention ==
The 1937 International Convention on the Transport of Corpses addresses the same issues as the 1973 Agreement. The 1973 Agreement simplifies some of the procedures and requirements that were first established in the 1937 Convention. For states that have ratified both treaties, the 1973 supersedes the 1937 Convention. However, the 1937 Convention remains in force for the following states that have ratified it but not the 1973 Agreement:

- Democratic Republic of the Congo
- Egypt
- Germany
- Italy
- Mexico
- Romania

== See also ==
- List of Council of Europe treaties
