= Strasbourg Agreement =

The Strasbourg Agreement can refer to:

- Strasbourg Agreement (1675), regarding the use of chemical weapons
- Strasbourg Agreement Concerning the International Patent Classification (1971)

== See also ==
- Strasbourg Convention (disambiguation)
