= Protocol on Mutual Legal Assistance in Criminal Matters =

- Type: Mutual legal assistance treaty
- Signed: June 25, 1996
- Location: San Luis, Argentina
- Signatories: Argentina; Brazil; Paraguay; Uruguay
- Depositaries: Government of Paraguay
- Languages: Portuguese; Spanish

Protocol on Mutual Legal Assistance in Criminal Matters (or Protocol of San Luis) is a MERCOSUR treaty signed by Argentina, Brazil, Paraguay and Uruguay adopted in San Luis province, Argentina, on 25 June 1996, with the goal of establishing a system of international criminal judicial cooperation among the States part of the treaty in criminal matters at the several levels of criminal cooperation excluding extradition, which has been regulated in the Agreement on Extradition between the States Parties of MERCOSUR of 1998.
