= Convention on the Manipulation of Sports Competitions =

2014 multilateral treaty

Macolin Convention
Convention on the Manipulation of Sports Competitions
- Drafted: 9 July 2014
- Signed: 18 September 2014
- Location: Macolin, Switzerland
- Effective: 1 September 2019
- Condition: 5 ratifications of which 3 from Council of Europe members
- Signatories: 43
- Parties: 15
- Depositary: Secretary General of the Council of Europe
- Languages: English and French

The Council of Europe Convention on the Manipulation of Sports Competitions, better known as the Macolin Convention, is a multilateral treaty that aims to prevent, detect, and punish match fixing in sport. The convention was concluded in Macolin/Magglingen, Switzerland, on 18 September 2014. At its conclusion, it was immediately signed by 15 states of the Council of Europe; it is open to ratification of Council of Europe states and other states that were involved in its negotiation. The treaty will enter into force after being ratified by five states, three of which must be Council of Europe states.

A major focus of the convention is to prevent and punish illegal sports betting operations and to prevent conflicts of interest in legal sports betting operators and sports organisations.

The Macolin Convention entered into force on 1 September 2019. It has been ratified by Norway, Portugal, Ukraine, Moldova, Switzerland, Italy, Greece, Belgium, France, Iceland, Lithuania, Spain, Sweden, Serbia, and San Marino. It has been signed by 40 other European States and by Australia, Morocco, and Russia.

== European Union ratification deadlock ==
Ratification by the European Union and many of its member states has been held up by the opposition of Malta, which objects to the convention's definition of "illegal sports betting" on the grounds that it goes beyond the scope of the treaty. A 2022 report by the French Senate linked this position to the economic weight of sports betting for Malta, which hosts many companies in the sector and offers them favourable tax conditions. The same report also pointed to institutional difficulties over the terms of the EU's accession to the convention.

In June 2020, a report to the Parliamentary Assembly of the Council of Europe by the Swiss rapporteur Roland Rino Büchel called for an end to "the years-long deadlock imposed by Malta" and noted that "the requirement for consensus within the European Union has hampered the implementation of the Convention".

== See also ==
- List of Council of Europe treaties
