= Convention for the Protection of the Architectural Heritage of Europe =

1987 treaty of the Council of Europe

Granada Convention
Convention for the Protection of the Architectural Heritage of Europe
- Drafted: 3 October 1985
- Location: Granada, Spain
- Effective: 1 December 1987
- Signatories: 34
- Ratifiers: 42
- Depositary: Secretary General of the Council of Europe
- Citations: ETS 121
- Languages: English and French

The Convention for the Protection of the Architectural Heritage of Europe (French: Convention pour la sauvegarde du patrimoine architectural de l'Europe), commonly known as the Granada Convention (French: Convention de Grenade), is a legally binding treaty that establishes a framework for architectural conservation in Europe. It was opened for signature in 1985 and entered into force on 1 December 1987. Of the forty-three member states of the Council of Europe, forty-two have ratified or acceded to the convention.

Adopted after three decades of cooperation among Council of Europe member states, the convention provides an important framework for safeguarding the cultural heritage of monuments and sites.

Together with the Framework Convention on the Value of Cultural Heritage for Society and the European Convention on the Protection of the Archaeological Heritage, the Granada Convention forms a central element of cultural heritage protection and policy development in Europe.

== Issues under the convention ==
The convention addresses the following objectives:

- Promote solidarity and cooperation among European parties in relation to heritage conservation.
- Incorporate principles of conservation policies within the framework of European cooperation.
- Strengthen and promote policies for the conservation and development of cultural heritage in Europe.

== Background ==
The origins of the convention can be traced to the European Cultural Convention signed in 1954. The first initiative for the protection of cultural heritage, promoted by the Parliamentary Assembly of the Council of Europe, began in 1963 with the establishment of Europa Nostra, which encouraged intergovernmental cooperation within Europe.

== Structure ==
=== Preamble ===
The preamble states the overall aim of the convention: to provide cultural references that enhance the European environment and to foster sustainable development, taking into account both economic growth and social progress. It affirms that member states of the Council of Europe, through the adoption of common principles, commit to permanent collaboration on conservation policies. This includes the establishment of minimum safeguard standards for architectural heritage. The preamble also notes that the Council of Europe has been active in matters of cultural and built heritage for over 30 years, and it sets out the purpose and guiding philosophy of European conservation.

=== Definition of architectural heritage ===
Article 1 provides three definitions of heritage, based on those established by the 1972 UNESCO Convention for the Protection of the World Cultural and Natural Heritage. These definitions cover monuments, groups of buildings, and sites.

=== Identification of properties to be protected ===
Article 2 requires the creation of inventories through surveys. These inventories document heritage as defined in Article 1 and provide the basis for assessing properties as the first step towards legal protection.

=== Statutory protection procedures ===
Articles 3, 4, and 5 outline the legal, political, and administrative measures to be taken by each Party to protect heritage properties. The application of these measures may vary by state or region. Article 4 specifies the legal provisions ensuring supervision of works that affect protected properties.

=== Ancillary measures ===
Articles 6, 7, and 8 describe the types of financial support that public authorities may provide to facilitate, encourage, and guarantee the maintenance and restoration of protected properties. They also address environmental considerations, such as public spaces and pollution control.

=== Sanctions ===
Article 9 requires Parties to ensure that infringements of heritage protection laws receive adequate responses, either through criminal or administrative measures.

=== Conservation policies ===
Articles 10 to 13 outline principles of integrated conservation, building on earlier work of the Council of Europe. They emphasise the principle of maintenance through use, as set out in Article 5 of the Venice Charter of ICOMOS. The articles also stress the need to balance use and conservation, ensuring that architectural and historical values are preserved. Article 13 highlights the importance of effective cooperation among the relevant administrative departments.

=== Participation and associations ===
Article 14 provides for the establishment of structures to facilitate cooperation between Parties or between concerned regions.

=== Information and training ===
Articles 15 and 16 emphasise the importance of public participation in conservation from an early stage, fostering appreciation and understanding of heritage. They also address the training of professionals and trades involved in conservation.

=== European coordination of conservation policies ===
Articles 17 to 21 define the coordination of European conservation policies. Articles 17 and 18 describe technical assistance systems under the Council of Europe. Article 19 highlights the importance of exchanges among heritage conservation professionals, while Article 20 recommends the creation of a monitoring committee to ensure effective implementation of the convention.

=== Final clauses ===
Articles 22 to 27 contain the final clauses typically included in Council of Europe conventions and agreements.

== Ratification ==
As of January 2025, forty-two states have ratified the convention, either by signing, acceding to it, or succeeding to it.

- Andorra
- Armenia
- Azerbaijan
- Belgium
- Bosnia and Herzegovina
- Bulgaria
- Croatia
- Cyprus
- Czech Republic
- Denmark
- Estonia
- Finland
- France
- Georgia
- Germany
- Greece
- Hungary
- Republic of Ireland
- Italy
- Latvia
- Liechtenstein
- Lithuania
- Luxembourg
- Malta
- Moldova
- Montenegro (Note: Initially acceded as part of Serbia and Montenegro.)
- Netherlands
- North Macedonia
- Norway
- Poland
- Portugal
- Romania
- Russia (Note: Initially acceded as the Soviet Union.)
- Serbia
- Slovakia
- Slovenia
- Spain
- Sweden
- Switzerland
- Turkey
- Ukraine
- United Kingdom

Five member states have not ratified the convention:

- Albania
- Austria
- Iceland
- Monaco
- San Marino

== See also ==
- Values (heritage)
- Cultural Heritage Management
- Cultural property law
- List of Council of Europe treaties
