= Convention on the Unification of Certain Points of Substantive Law on Patents for Invention =

1963 treaty of the Council of Europe

The Convention on the Unification of Certain Points of Substantive Law on Patents for Invention, also called Strasbourg Convention or Strasbourg Patent Convention, is a multilateral treaty signed by Member States of the Council of Europe on 27 November 1963 in Strasbourg, France. It entered into force on 1 August 1980, and led to a significant harmonization of patent laws across European countries.

This Convention establishes patentability criteria, i.e. specifies on which grounds inventions can be rejected as not patentable. Its intent was to harmonize substantive patent law but not procedural law. This convention is quite different from the European Patent Convention (EPC), which establishes an independent system for granting European patents.

The Strasbourg Convention has had a significant impact on the EPC, on national patent laws across Europe, on the Patent Cooperation Treaty (PCT), on the Patent Law Treaty (PLT) and on the WTO's TRIPS.

== Ratifications and accessions ==
Thirteen countries ratified the treaty or acceded to it: Belgium, Denmark, France, Germany, Ireland, Italy, Liechtenstein, Luxembourg, the Republic of Macedonia, Netherlands, Sweden, Switzerland, and United Kingdom.

== See also ==
- International Patent Institute (IIB)
- List of Council of Europe treaties
- Paris Convention for the Protection of Industrial Property
- Substantive Patent Law Treaty (SPLT)
- Unitary patent, a European patent that benefits from unitary effect in the participating member states of the European Union
