= European Convention on Mutual Assistance in Criminal Matters =

1959 international treaty

The European Convention on Mutual Assistance in Criminal Matters is a 1959 Council of Europe mutual legal assistance treaty. It has been ratified by 50 states including all 46 member states of the Council of Europe.

The parties to the Convention agree to offer each other "the widest measure of mutual assistance" in investigating crimes, procuring evidence, and in prosecuting criminal suspects. The Convention specifies the requirements that requests for legal assistance and letters rogatory from the "requesting state" to the "requested state" have to meet. The Convention also sets out rules for the enforcement of such letters rogatory by the authorities of the requested state.

The Convention was concluded in Strasbourg, France, on 20 April 1959 and entered into force on 12 June 1962. In 2009, San Marino became the 47th and final member state of the Council of Europe to ratify the Convention, making it one of the few universal Conventions amongst member states of the Council. The Convention has also been ratified by Chile, Russia, Israel, and South Korea.

== See also ==
- List of Council of Europe treaties
