= Lanzarote Convention =

European treaty to criminalise forms of child sexual abuse

Council of Europe Convention on the Protection of Children Against Sexual Exploitation and Sexual Abuse
- Signed: 25 October 2007
- Location: Lanzarote, Canary Islands, Spain
- Effective: 1 July 2010
- Condition: five ratifications, three of which are by Council of Europe states
- Signatories: 48
- Parties: 48
- Depositary: Secretary General of the Council of Europe
- Languages: English and French

The Council of Europe Convention on the Protection of Children Against Sexual Exploitation and Sexual Abuse, also known as the Lanzarote Convention, is a Council of Europe multilateral treaty whereby states agree to criminalise certain forms of sexual abuse against children. It is the first international treaty that addresses child sexual abuse that occurs within the home or family.

== Content ==
States that ratify the Convention agree to criminalise sexual activity with children below the legal age of consent, regardless of the context in which such behaviour occurs; it also mandates the criminalisation of child prostitution and pornography. The Convention sets out several measures to prevent child sexual exploitation and abuse, including the training and educating of children, monitoring of offenders, and the screening and training of people who are employed or volunteer to work with children.

== Conclusion and entry into force ==
The Convention was concluded and signed on 25 October 2007 in Lanzarote, Spain. All states of the Council of Europe have signed and ratified the Convention. The last state to ratify it is Ireland, in 2020. It came into force on 1 July 2010 after being ratified by five states.

== State parties ==
As of 11 May 2020, the treaty has been ratified by the following 48 states:

- Albania
- Andorra
- Armenia
- Austria
- Azerbaijan
- Belgium
- Bosnia and Herzegovina
- Bulgaria
- Croatia
- Cyprus
- Czech Republic
- Denmark
- Estonia
- Finland
- France
- Georgia
- Germany
- Greece
- Hungary
- Iceland
- Ireland
- Italy
- Latvia
- Liechtenstein
- Lithuania
- Luxembourg
- Macedonia
- Malta
- Moldova
- Monaco
- Montenegro
- Netherlands
- Norway
- Poland
- Portugal
- Romania
- Russia
- San Marino
- Serbia
- Slovakia
- Slovenia
- Spain
- Sweden
- Switzerland
- Tunisia
- Turkey
- Ukraine
- United Kingdom

Although it was specifically designed for states of the Council of Europe, the Convention is open to accession by any state in the world; as of 2019 it has been ratified by Tunisia.

== See also ==
- Optional Protocol on the Sale of Children, Child Prostitution and Child Pornography
- European system of international human rights law
- List of Council of Europe treaties
