= Data Privacy Day =

Data privacy in modern digital space

Data Privacy & Protection Day (Data Protection Day internationally)
- Date: 28 January
- Next time: 28 January 2027
- Frequency: annual
- First time: 2007

Data Privacy Day (known in Europe as Data Protection Day) is an international event that occurs every year on 28 January. The purpose of Data Privacy Day is to raise awareness and promote privacy and data protection best practices. It has been observed in the United States, Canada, Qatar, Nigeria, Israel and 47 European countries.

== Purpose ==
The Data Privacy Day educational initiative originally focused on raising awareness among businesses and users about the importance of protecting the privacy of their personal information online, particularly in the context of social networking. The educational focus has expanded over the years to include families, consumers and businesses. In addition to its educational initiatives, Data Privacy Day promotes events and activities that stimulate the development of technology tools that promote individual control over personally identifiable information; encourage compliance with privacy laws and regulations; and create dialogues among stakeholders interested in advancing data protection and privacy. The international celebration offers opportunities for collaboration among governments, industry, academia, nonprofits, privacy professionals and educators.

== History ==
The Convention for the Protection of Individuals with regard to Automatic Processing of Personal Data was opened for signature by the Council of Europe on 28 January 1981. The Budapest Convention on Cybercrime is also protecting the integrity of data systems and thus of privacy in cyberspace. Privacy including data protection is also protected by Article 8 of the European Convention on Human Rights.

The Council of Europe first held a European Data Protection Day in 2007. Two years later, on 26 January 2009, the United States House of Representatives passed House Resolution HR 31 by a vote of 402–0, declaring 28 January National Data Privacy Day. On 28 January 2009, the Senate passed Senate Resolution 25 also recognizing 28 January 2009 as National Data Privacy Day. The United States Senate also recognized Data Privacy Day in 2010 and 2011.

Participating organizations for the 28 January 2016 Data Privacy and Protection Day included Anti-Phishing Working Group, Carnegie Mellon University, Cyber Data-Risk Managers, EDUCAUSE, Georgetown University, Federal Trade Commission (FTC), Federal Communications Commission (FCC), Federal Bureau of Investigation (FBI), Identity Theft Council, the Privacy Commissioner of Canada, New York State Attorney General Office, the UK Information Commissioner, and Data Security Council of India.

== See also ==
- Data security
