= Faro Convention =

Council of Europe Framework Convention on the Value of Cultural Heritage for Society
- Signed: 27 October 2005
- Location: Faro, Portugal
- Effective: 1 June 2011
- Condition: 10 ratifications
- Signatories: 4
- Ratifiers: 26
- Depositary: Secretary General of the Council of Europe
- Languages: English and French

The Council of Europe Framework Convention on the Value of Cultural Heritage for Society, better known as the Faro Convention, is a multilateral Council of Europe treaty whereby states agree to protect cultural heritage and the rights of citizens to access and participate in that heritage.

== Content ==
The Faro Convention establishes rights and responsibilities to and for cultural heritage, explicitly in the context of Article 27 of the United Nations Declaration of Human Rights which guarantees the right "freely to participate in the cultural life of the community".

Article 1 of the convention states that "rights relating to cultural heritage are inherent in the right to participate in cultural life." Article 4 states that "everyone...has the right to benefit from the cultural heritage and to contribute towards its enrichment."

The convention also focuses on promoting sustainability, access and the use of digital technology in the context of cultural heritage.

== Conclusion and entry into force ==
The Convention was concluded and signed on 27 October 2005 in Faro, Portugal. The most recent signatory was San Marino in February 2024. It came into force on 1 June 2011 after being ratified by ten states.

== State parties ==
As of March 2026, the treaty has been ratified by the following 26 states:

- Armenia
- Austria
- Belgium
- Bosnia and Herzegovina
- Croatia
- Estonia
- Finland
- Georgia
- Hungary
- Italy
- Latvia
- Luxembourg
- Moldova
- North Macedonia
- Montenegro
- Norway
- Portugal
- Romania
- Serbia
- Slovakia
- Slovenia
- Spain
- Switzerland
- Ukraine
- Poland
- San Marino

== See also ==
- Convention for the Protection of the Architectural Heritage of Europe
