= Design Law Treaty =

Design Law Treaty
- Drafted: 2005–2024
- Signed: 22 November 2024
- Location: Riyadh
- Condition: 15 contracting parties
- Depositary: WIPO

The Design Law Treaty (DLT), also called the Riyadh Design Law Treaty (RDLT), is an international legal instrument adopted on 22 November 2024 by the World Intellectual Property Organization (WIPO) in Riyadh. The goal of the treaty is to harmonise part of the procedural aspects of design law.

The treaty aims to globally streamline the formalities related to industrial designs protection, in order to make it easier and more affordable for designers to protect their designs in their home markets and abroad.

Currently, the treaty is not in force anywhere since less than 15 parties have joined it.

== Preparation of the treaty ==
=== 2005 ===
The discussions over the DLT began in 2005, when, at its fifteenth session, the WIPO Standing Committee on the Law of Trademarks, Industrial Designs and Geographical Indications (SCT) agreed to start working on design registration formalities and procedures.

Work at the SCT kicked off with a questionnaire to gather information about design procedures and formalities in WIPO member states. Based on the returns to the questionnaire and on several observer organizations’ submissions, the SCT identified existing divergences, common trends and possible areas of convergence, as well as users’ preferred practices. To inform its work, the SCT also requested the Secretariat to prepare a number of information documents and to carry out a Study on the Potential Impact of the Work of the SCT on Industrial Design Law and Practice, including an analysis of the flexibilities for SCT Members in the draft Articles and draft Rules on Industrial Design Law and Practice.

=== 2005–2022 ===
Over several years, the SCT reviewed in detail a number of iterations of the draft Articles and draft Regulations. However, two outstanding issues prevented the WIPO General Assembly from agreeing to convene a diplomatic conference until the breakthrough decision of the 2022 WIPO General Assembly.

The first issue concerned technical assistance and capacity-building to implement the DLT.

The second issue relates to a proposal made in November 2015 by the African Group. The proposal consists in adding in Article 3(1)(a) of the draft DLT (which sets a maximum list of indications or elements to be included in an application for design protection) a non-mandatory requirement of disclosure of the origin or source of traditional cultural expressions, traditional knowledge or biological/genetic resources utilized or incorporated in an industrial design. This proposal, however, did not have the unanimous support of all Member States. In 2019, Ambassador Socorro Flores Liera, from Mexico, acting as facilitator, proposed a compromise solution. This compromise solution was to be discussed at the Diplomatic Conference.

A breakthrough came when the 2022 session of the WIPO General Assembly approved to convene a Diplomatic Conference to negotiate the Design Law Treaty (DLT).

=== 2023 ===
In preparation for the Diplomatic Conference, and as mandated by the 2022 WIPO General Assembly Decision, the Standing Committee on the Law of Trademarks, Industrial Designs and Geographical Indications (SCT) met in a Special Session “to further close any existing gaps to a sufficient level” from October 2 to 6, 2023, in Geneva (Switzerland). This session agreed on the text of the Basic Proposal to be considered by the Diplomatic Conference, consisting of the draft articles and draft rules, along with proposals made by delegations during that session. In addition, a Preparatory Committee of the Diplomatic Conference took place from October 9 to 11, 2023, also in Geneva, to examine the draft administrative provisions and final clauses of the treaty and to agree on the draft rules of procedure, the draft agenda, dates and venue for the Diplomatic Conference.

== Riyadh Diplomatic Conference of 2024 ==
=== Convening and organization ===
The Diplomatic Conference on the adoption of the DLT was held in Riyadh (Saudi Arabia) between 11 and 22 November 2024.

=== Adoption and signatures ===
At the end of the Diplomatic Conference, on 22 November 2024, the DLT was adopted, with 193 WIPO member states attending the signing ceremony.

The WIPO Director General Daren Tang stated, at the end of the Diplomatic Conference, on the occasion of this adoption: "After 20 years, and two long weeks – we made history today, and we welcome the 28th WIPO Treaty – the Riyadh Design Law Treaty".

== Ratifications and entry into force ==
The DLT must have 15 contracting parties to enter into force.

The following countries have joined the DLT:

1. Albania
2. El Salvador
3. Saudi Arabia
4. Georgia

== Legal provisions ==
The legal provisions of the DLT are as follows, as presented by the WIPO:

- set a maximum list of indications or elements that designers must submit with an application. [...]
- allow applicants to choose how they represent the design in an application (drawings, photographs or, if admitted by the IP office, video).
- allow applicants to include several designs in a single application, under certain conditions.
- set out requirements for the granting of a filing date. [...]
- provide for a grace period of 12 months following a first disclosure of the design, during which such disclosure will not affect its validity for registration.
- allow applicants to keep their designs unpublished for at least six months after having secured a filing date.
- provide relief measures and offer some flexibility to applicants to prevent them from losing their rights if they miss a deadline. [...]
- simplify the procedure for requesting the renewal of a design registration.
- further the introduction of e-filing systems for designs and the electronic exchange of priority documents.

== See also ==
- Patent Law Treaty
- Trademark Law Treaty (1994)
- Singapore Treaty on the Law of Trademarks
