= Council of Europe Convention on the Counterfeiting of Medical Products =

International criminal law treaty

MEDICRIME Convention
Council of Europe Convention on the Counterfeiting of Medical Products and Similar Crimes involving Threats to Public Health
- Signed: 28 October 2011
- Location: Moscow, Russia
- Effective: 1 January 2016
- Condition: 5 ratifications, including at least 3 Council of Europe member states
- Signatories: 22 signatures and 23 ratifications
- Parties: 23 (as of december 2024)
- Depositary: Secretary General of the Council of Europe
- Languages: French and English

The Council of Europe Convention on the Counterfeiting of Medical Products and Similar Crimes involving Threats to Public Health, also known as the MEDICRIME Convention, is an international criminal law convention, established by the Council of Europe. It focuses on combating the falsification of medicines and medical devices.

== History ==
The convention was approved by the Committee of Ministers of the Council of Europe in 2010 and made available for signing at a prominent conference held in Moscow on October 28, 2011. The official versions of the convention are in English and French, both of which have equal authenticity. Non-official translations in other languages are also accessible, but should be considered for informational purposes only.

Currently, the MEDICRIME Convention stands as the sole international legal instrument that enables the criminalization of counterfeit medical products.

Despite being developed by a European institution, this convention is open for signing and ratification by countries outside of Europe as well.

== Products covered by the convention ==
The scope of the MEDICRIME Convention encompasses various categories, such as medicines intended for human and veterinary use, as well as the ingredients, components, and materials utilized in the manufacturing of medicines. Additionally, it includes medical devices, accessories, and medicines employed in clinical trials.

== Key provisions ==
The treaty comprises 33 articles structured around three pillars:

1. Criminalizing the falsification of medicines and medical devices.
2. Safeguarding the rights of victims.
3. Promoting cooperation at national and international levels.

The convention focuses on criminal law aspects and does not address unintentional quality defects or violations of intellectual property rights. While the term "counterfeit" may be used to refer to a false representation regarding identity and/or source, the preferred term within the medical context is "falsification," as the primary aim is to protect public health.

=== Criminalizing the falsification of medicines and medical devices ===
The convention addresses certain acts that are deemed dangerous to public health and criminalizes them. Only intentional acts are considered punishable offenses.

According to Article 5 of the convention, the intentional manufacturing of falsified medical products, active substances, excipients, parts, materials, and accessories is classified as a criminal offense.

Article 6 states that the intentional supply (including brokering, procuring, selling, donating, offering for free, and promoting), possession for the purpose of supply, import, and export of falsified medical products, active substances, excipients, parts, materials, and accessories are criminal offenses.

Article 7 specifies that intentionally producing false documents and tampering with existing ones are criminal offenses.

Article 8 identifies offenses that are considered similar to falsification due to their significant threat to public health. This includes the intentional manufacturing or placing on the market of medicinal products without authorization as well as the inclusion of medical devices that do not comply with conformity requirements.

=== Protecting victims’ rights ===
The convention strengthens the rights of victims by guaranteeing their access to pertinent information, supporting their recovery, and facilitating their compensation, among other provisions. Victims are not obligated to press charges or provide evidence of harm in order for an investigation to be initiated; the potential risk to public health is considered sufficient.

=== Encouraging national and international co-operation ===
Promoting and facilitating cooperation at both national and international levels is a significant aspect of the convention. Given the diverse range of stakeholders involved in addressing the growing occurrence of such crimes, including health authorities, law enforcement agencies, customs services, and the judiciary, it is important to encourage and facilitate synergies and collaboration among them. States that are parties to the convention are urged to establish a mechanism that enables seamless information exchange and cooperation within and across borders.

== Parties ==
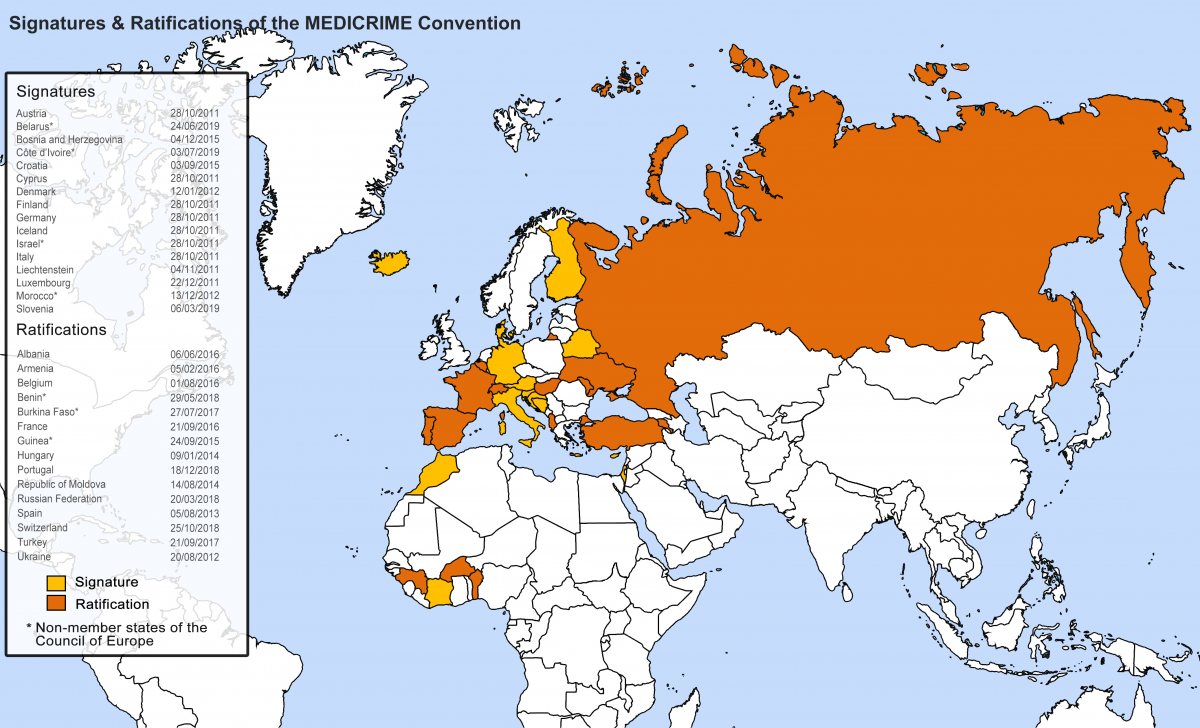
Signatures and ratifications of the Council of Europe MEDICRIME Convention (CETS No. 211)

As of May 2026, the Convention on the Falsification of Medical Products and Similar Crimes involving Threats to Public Health has been ratified by 23 state parties.

Additionally, 22 countries have signed the convention but have not yet ratified it. The Committee of Ministers of the Council of Europe has extended invitations to Cameroon and Senegal to join the MEDICRIME convention.

State Parties	Signatory	Ratification	Entry into effect
Albania	17/12/2015	06/06/2016	01/10/2016
Germany	28/10/2011		
Armenia	20/09/2012	05/02/2016	01/06/2016
Austria	28/10/2011		
Belgium	24/07/2012	01/08/2016	01/11/2016
Benin	29/05/2018	29/05/2018	01/09/2018
Belarus	24/06/2019	28/09/2020	01/01/2021
Bosnia-Herzegovina	04/12/2015	18/09/2020	01/01/2021
Burkina Faso	16/02/2017	27/07/2017	01/11/2017
Cyprus	28/10/2011	05/09/2023	01/01/2024
Congo	05/06/2023		
Côte d'Ivoire	03/07/2019		
Croatia	03/09/2015	20/09/2019	01/01/2020
Denmark	12/01/2012		
Spain	08/10/2012	05/08/2013	01/01/2016
Ecuador	07/05/2021		
Finland	28/10/2011		
France	28/10/2011	21/09/2016	01/01/2017
Greece	18/05/2022		
Guinea	10/10/2012	24/09/2015	01/01/2016
Hungary	26/09/2013	09/01/2014	01/01/2016
Iceland	28/10/2011		
Israel	28/10/2011		
Italy	28/10/2011		
Liechtenstein	04/11/2011		
Lithuania	21/04/2022		
Luxemburg	22/12/2011		
North Macedonia	09/09/2021		
Morocco	13/12/2012	19/04/2022	01/08/2022
Moldavia	20/09/2012	14/08/2014	01/01/2016
Niger	19/02/2021	10/03/2022	01/07/2022
Norway	12/04/2023		
Portugal	28/10/2011	18/12/2018	01/04/2019
Russia	28/10/2011	20/03/2018	01/07/2018
Serbia	02/10/2019		
Slovakia	24/10/2023		
Slovenia	06/03/2019	03/05/2022	01/09/2022
Switzerland	28/10/2011	25/10/2018	01/02/2019
Togo	16/01/2023		
Tunisia	07/02/2024		
Turkey	29/06/2012	21/09/2017	01/01/2018
Ukraine	28/10/2011	20/08/2012	01/01/2016
Chad	11/09/2024		
Chile	27/11/2024		

In July 2017, Burkina Faso became the 10th country to ratify the convention, triggering the establishment of the Committee of the Parties. This committee, named the MEDICRIME Committee, is the convention’s monitoring body and is tasked with facilitating the implementation and follow-up of the convention in the state parties as well as the collection, analysis, and exchange of information, experience, and good practice between states to improve their capacity to prevent and combat the counterfeiting of medical products and similar crimes involving threats to public health. Its first meeting took place in December 2018, and it adopted its rules or procedure in its second meeting on December 12–13, 2020.

== See also ==
- Anti-Counterfeiting Trade Agreement
- List of Council of Europe treaties
- 2025 Counterfeit medication scandal
