= Trademark Law Treaty (1994) =

- Signed: October 28, 1994
- Effective: August 1, 1996
- Signatories: 42 (initial)

The Trademark Law Treaty (TLT) is a 1994 treaty entered into by a large number of countries establishing procedures for recognizing trademarks registered in other member countries. It operates under the auspices of the World Intellectual Property Organization.

== Purpose ==
The treaty was established "with objectives to reduce the complexities in the multitude of registration procedures and to increase predictability of application outcomes" through "simplification and harmonization of certain features of these trademark registration procedures and formalities". According to the United States Patent and Trademark Office, the Trademark Law Treaty "simplifies and harmonizes trademark application and registration procedures by member states. It facilitates renewals, the recordation of assignments, name and address changes, and powers of attorney".

== Adoption ==
The treaty was adopted on October 27, 1994, and signed by 42 countries on October 28, 1994, with three additional countries signing in November of that year, and 12 more signing in 1995. The first five countries for which the treaty entered into force were the Czech Republic, Moldova, Sri Lanka, Ukraine, and the United Kingdom, all on August 1, 1996.

By the 2000s, it became apparent that the terms of the treaty were outdated in light of the intervening development of the internet as a means of conveying information about products and businesses, leading to the enactment of the Singapore Treaty on the Law of Trademarks.

== See also ==
- Patent Law Treaty
- Design Law Treaty
