= European Convention on the International Classification of Patents for Invention =

1954 Council of Europe treaty

The European Convention on the International Classification of Patents for Invention was signed on December 19, 1954, in Paris, France, by members of the Council of Europe. It entered into force on August 1, 1955, and it was denounced by all Parties and ceased to be in force as from February 18, 1999. The Convention created the International Classification of Patents for Invention. The convention is written in English and French, both texts being equally authoritative.

The convention, along with the European Convention relating to the Formalities required for Patent Applications of 1953, resulted from the work of the Council of Europe's Committee of Experts in patent matters in the early 1950s.

== See also ==
- List of Council of Europe treaties
- Strasbourg Agreement Concerning the International Patent Classification of March 24, 1971
- International Patent Classification
