= European Convention on the Repatriation of Minors =

1970 Council of Europe treaty

- Signed: 28 May 1970
- Location: The Hague
- Effective: 28 July 2015
- Signatories: 7
- Parties: 3
- Depositary: Council of Europe
- Languages: English, French

The European Convention on the Repatriation of Minors is a 1970 Council of Europe treaty which allows a state to request that other states return minors to its legal jurisdiction.

== Content ==
A state party to the Convention is empowered to demand from any state party the repatriation of any minor from the first state (the "requesting state") who is present in the second state (the "requested state"). A repatriation can be requested in three circumstances:

1. the presence of the minor in the requested state is against the will of the legal guardians of the minor;
2. the presence of the minor in the requested state is incompatible with a measure of protection or re-education taken in respect of the minor by government authorities of the requesting State; or
3. the presence of the minor is necessary in the requesting state because there proceedings there with a view to taking measures of protection and re-education in respect of the minor.

If the requested state has legislation outside of the Convention which allows for the repatriation of minors upon request, the Convention also allows repatriation in cases where the requesting state deems the minor's presence in the requested state to be incompatible with the interests of the minor or the interests of the requesting state.

== Conclusion, signatures, and ratifications ==
The Convention was concluded in The Hague, Netherlands, on 28 May 1970. It was opened for ratification or accession by all states, including states not part of the Council of Europe. On the date of conclusion, it was signed by Austria, Belgium, France, West Germany, Luxembourg, and the Netherlands. It was later signed by Italy (1971), Turkey (1974), Greece (1980), and Malta (2015).

To enter into force, the Convention required three states to ratify or accede to it. In 1976, Turkey was the first country to ratify. Italy ratified the Convention in 1995 and Malta ratified in 2015. As a result, the Convention entered into force on 28 July 2015.
