= Singapore Treaty on the Law of Trademarks =

International treaty

- Parties Signed, but not ratified
- Signed: 28 March 2006
- Location: Singapore
- Effective: 16 March 2009
- Condition: 10 ratifications
- Signatories: 59
- Parties: 58
- Depositary: Director-General of the World Intellectual Property Organization
- Languages: English, Arabic, Chinese, French, Russian and Spanish

The Singapore Treaty on the Law of Trademarks is a treaty adopted by the World Intellectual Property Organization in Singapore on 28 March 2006. It entered into force on 16 March 2009, following the ratification or accession of ten countries, namely Singapore, Switzerland, Bulgaria, Romania, Denmark, Latvia, Kyrgyzstan, United States, Moldova, and Australia. The treaty establishes common standards for procedural aspects of trademark registration and licensing.

The treaty was built on the Trademark Law Treaty of 1994 (TLT), however the Singapore Treaty was meant to have a wider scope of application and addresses more recent developments in the field of communication technologies.

As of September 2026, there are 58 contracting parties to the treaty, which includes 54 states plus the African Intellectual Property Organization and the Benelux Organization for Intellectual Property.

== See also ==
- Patent Law Treaty
- Design Law Treaty
- Trademark Law Treaty (1994)
