= European Convention on the International Validity of Criminal Judgments =

1970 Council of Europe treaty

The European Convention on the International Validity of Criminal Judgments is a 1970 treaty of the Council of Europe whereby the states that agree to the treaty recognise the validity of criminal judgments and sentences handed down in other states that have ratified the treaty. The treaty also allows penal sentences to be served in the country of a person's residence if both the sentencing country and the country of residence are parties to the treaty.

The convention was concluded on the 25 May 1970 in The Hague, Netherlands. It entered into force on 26 July 1974. As of January 2020, it has been signed by 28 European states and ratified by 23 of them. The states that have signed but not ratified the convention are Germany, Greece, Italy, Luxembourg, and Portugal.

The following states have ratified the convention:

- Albania
- Austria
- Belgium
- Bulgaria
- Cyprus
- Denmark (extended to the Faroe Islands, but not to Greenland)
- Estonia
- Georgia
- Iceland
- Latvia
- Lithuania
- Moldova
- Montenegro
- Netherlands (for the Kingdom in Europe only)
- Norway (extended to Bouvet Island, Peter I Island, and Queen Maud Land)
- Romania
- San Marino
- Serbia
- Slovenia
- Spain
- Sweden
- Turkey
- Ukraine

== See also ==
- List of Council of Europe treaties
