= Substantive Patent Law Treaty =

Proposed international patent law treaty

The Substantive Patent Law Treaty (SPLT) is a proposed international patent law treaty aimed at harmonizing substantive points of patent law. In contrast with the Patent Law Treaty (PLT), signed in 2000 and now in force, which only relates to formalities, the SPLT aims at going far beyond formalities to harmonize substantive requirements such as novelty, inventive step and non-obviousness, industrial applicability and utility, as well as sufficient disclosure, unity of invention, or claim drafting and interpretation.

Delegations did not reach agreement as to the modalities and scope of the future work of the committee. As a result, the negotiations were put on hold in 2006.

== See also ==
- Patent Cooperation Treaty (PCT)
- Patent Law Treaty (PLT)
- World Intellectual Property Organization (WIPO)
- Paris Convention for the Protection of Industrial Property
- Strasbourg Convention (1963)
- Agreement on Trade-Related Aspects of Intellectual Property Rights (TRIPs Agreement)
