= Council of Europe Convention on the Avoidance of Statelessness in Relation to State Succession =

2006 treaty

- Drafted: 15 March 2006
- Signed: 19 March 2006
- Location: Strasbourg
- Effective: 1 May 2009
- Condition: Ratification by 3 Council of Europe member states
- Parties: 7
- Depositary: Secretary General of the Council of Europe
- Citations: CETS 200
- Languages: English; French

The Council of Europe Convention on the Avoidance of Statelessness in Relation to State Succession is a treaty that aims to ensure that people are not left without a nationality when one or more states replace their state of nationality. Such cases occur when individuals lose the nationality of the replaced state but do not acquire that of any replacing state. This convention builds on the European Convention on Nationality to establish detailed rules to prevent these cases.

In response to a growing risk of statelessness from a "wave" of state succession in Eastern Europe in the 1990s and 2000s, the United Nations General Assembly encouraged states to consider developing legal instruments to regulate the ensuing issues of nationality. This treaty that was drafted and signed in March 2006 and became effective in May 2009 remains the only "positive response" to that encouragement to date.

== Parties and signatories ==
States parties States that have signed but not ratified

The treaty has seven states parties and two signatories that have not ratified. The states parties are Austria, Hungary, Luxembourg, Moldova, Montenegro, the Netherlands, and Norway. The signatories are Germany and Ukraine. All are members of the Council of Europe. In 2019, the Commissioner for Human Rights noted that many members had not joined international "instruments on statelessness and nationality", and "only seven" had joined this convention. The Commissioner urged members to do so as part of a campaign to eradicate statelessness.
