= Ljubljana–Hague Convention =

Ljubljana–Hague Convention on Mutual Legal Assistance
The Ljubljana – The Hague Convention on International Cooperation in the Investigation and Prosecution of Genocide, Crimes against Humanity, War Crimes and other International Crimes
- Drafted: 26 May 2023
- Signed: 14 February 2024
- Location: The Hague, Netherlands
- Depositary: Kingdom of Belgium

The Ljubljana–Hague Convention on Mutual Legal Assistance (full name: The Ljubljana – The Hague Convention on International Cooperation in the Investigation and Prosecution of Genocide, Crimes against Humanity, War Crimes and other International Crimes) is an effort to streamline the prosecution of offenders against international criminal law through cooperation between states on matters such as information sharing, extradition, jurisdiction, and the definitions of international crimes.

It also has a special list of other serious crimes, like torture or forced disappearances, that countries can choose to include if they want to. This means countries can pick and choose to cover more crimes mentioned in Article 2(2)- States Parties can extend the Convention's scope to other international crimes listed in Annexes A to H, making the rulebook flexible.

== Parties ==
It was agreed to by 68 states on 26 May 2023.

As of February 2025, it has been signed by the following states:

Albania, Argentina, Austria, Belgium, Bulgaria, Central African Republic, Chile, Costa Rica, Croatia, Cyprus, Czech Republic, Democratic Republic of Congo, Danmark, Finland, France, Germany, Ghana, Republic of Ireland, Kosovo, Liechtenstein, Lithuania, Luxembourg, Malta, Moldova, Mongolia, Montenegro, Netherlands, North Macedonia, Norway, Poland, Rwanda, Senegal, Slovenia, Sweden, Switzerland, Ukraine, Uruguay.
