= Convention for the Protection of Individuals with Regard to Automatic Processing of Personal Data =

1981 Council of Europe treaty

- Signed: 28 January 1981
- Location: Strasbourg, France
- Effective: 1 October 1985
- Condition: 5 ratifications
- Signatories: 47
- Ratifiers: 55
- Depositary: Secretary General of the Council of Europe
- Citations: ETS 108
- Languages: English and French

The Convention for the Protection of Individuals with Regard to Automatic Processing of Personal Data aka Convention 108 is a 1981 Council of Europe treaty that protects the right to privacy of individuals, taking account of the increasing flow across frontiers of personal data undergoing automatic processing.

All members of the Council of Europe have ratified the treaty. Being non–Council of Europe states, Argentina, Cabo Verde, Mauritius, Mexico, Morocco, Senegal, Tunisia, and Uruguay have acceded to the treaty.

Since 1985, this data protection convention has been updated, and a new instrument on artificial intelligence has been added. The Council of Europe approved a proposed modernization of the agreement in 2018. The modernization included an obligation to report when data breaches occur, additional accountability for data storers, and new rights for the algorithmic decision making.

== See also ==
- General Data Protection Regulation
- Directive 95/46/EC on the protection of personal data
- Data privacy
- Data Privacy Day
- Information privacy
- List of Council of Europe treaties
