= European Convention on Information on Foreign Law =

1968 Council of Europe treaty

The European Convention on Information on Foreign Law is a 1968 Council of Europe treaty whereby states agree to procedures for the mandatory provision of information when a state requests information on the legal system of another state.

== Content ==
States that ratify the Convention appoint a single body to receive requests from other state parties regarding information on the "law and procedure in civil and commercial fields as well as on their judicial organisation". When a request for such information is received from a judicial authority in another state party, the Convention makes it mandatory of the state to provide information in response to the request. States may by individual agreement or declaration expand the categories of information that must be provided.

== Creation and state parties ==
The convention was concluded in London on 7 June 1968 and entered into force 17 December 1969. As of 2019, 43 of the 47 member states of the Council of Europe have ratified the convention; it has also been ratified by Belarus, Costa Rica, Mexico, and Morocco. The four Council of Europe states that have not ratified the convention are Andorra, Armenia, Ireland, and San Marino.

== Additional Protocol ==
On 15 March 1978 the Additional Protocol to the European Convention on Information on Foreign Law was concluded in Strasbourg. The Additional Protocol expands the categories of information that must be provided to encompass "substantive and procedural law and judicial organisation in the criminal field, including prosecuting authorities, as well as on the law concerning the enforcement of penal measures".

The Additional Protocol entered into force on 31 August 1979. As of 2013, it has been ratified by 38 Council of Europe states plus Belarus, Mexico, and Morocco.

== See also ==
- List of Council of Europe treaties
