= Strasbourg Agreement Concerning the International Patent Classification =

1971 international patent law treaty

- Signed: 24 March 1971
- Effective: 7 October 1975
- Condition: see Article 13 of the Agreement
- Parties: 68
- Depositary: Director-General of WIPO
- Language: English, French

The Strasbourg Agreement Concerning the International Patent Classification (or IPC), also known as the IPC Agreement, is an international treaty that established a common classification for patents for invention, inventors' certificates, utility models and utility certificates, known as the "International Patent Classification" (IPC). The treaty was signed in Strasbourg, France, on 24 March 1971; it entered into force on 7 October 1975 and was amended on 28 September 1979. The Agreement and the certified statement were registered by the World Intellectual Property Organization on 28 February 1980.

States that are parties to the Paris Convention for the Protection of Industrial Property (1883) may become party to the Strasbourg Agreement. As of June 2026, there were 68 contracting parties to the Strasbourg Agreement. The Holy See, the Iran and Liechtenstein signed the Agreement in 1971 but have not ratified it.

== See also ==
- European Convention on the International Classification of Patents for Invention (1954)
