= European Convention relating to the Formalities required for Patent Applications =

1953 multilateral treaty

The European Convention relating to the formalities required for patent applications was signed at Paris on December 11, 1953. Its aim was to "simplify and unify, as far as it is possible, the formalities required by the various national legislations for patent applications". It was open to the signature of the members of the Council of Europe, came into force on June 1, 1955, and, after it came into force, became open to accession by all States which are members of the International Union for the Protection of Industrial Property. There were 21 ratifications or accessions to the convention, including Israel and South Africa. Since then, all but five of the states parties have denounced the convention (many of them in 1977 or 1978).

The convention, along with the European Convention on the International Classification of Patents for Invention of 1954, resulted from the work of the Council of Europe's Committee of Experts in patent matters in the early 1950s.

== See also ==
- List of Council of Europe treaties
- Patent Law Treaty (PLT), signed in 2000
