= Patent Law Treaty =

2000 patent treaty

The Patent Law Treaty (PLT) is a treaty adopted by the World Intellectual Property Organization (WIPO) on 1 June 2000 in Geneva, Switzerland. It entered into force on April 28, 2005. It aims at harmonizing and streamlining formal procedures such as the requirements to obtain a filing date for a patent application, the form and content of a patent application, and representation. The treaty "does not establish a uniform procedure for all parties to the PLT but leaves parties free to require fewer or more user-friendly requirements than those provided in the PLT." As of July 2026, the PLT had 44 contracting states, that includes the European Patent Organisation (EPO) and the Eurasian Patent Organization (EAPO).

== History ==
The adoption of the Patent Cooperation Treaty in 1970 simplified the filling of patent applications by harmonizing certain procedural requirements at the international level; however, many countries continued to differ in the patentability requirements they imposed in their national laws. Thus, it became clear that there was also a need to harmonize the substantive requirements across the various jurisdictions in order to further improve and standardize the international patent system.

Negotiations to achieve such harmonization began in the mid-1980s. One of the first attempts was a draft of an instrument called the Patent Harmonization Treaty, which was discussed in a diplomatic conference held in The Hague in 1991. However, the negotiations were abandoned in 1993 due to the opposition of the United States to accepting the “first-to-file” principle, and also because in a parallel way the TRIPS Agreement had been negotiated, which included many similar provisions to those taken in the draft of the Patent Harmonization Treaty.

Two years later, during the meetings of the WIPO General Assembly and the Paris Union Assembly held between September 25 and October 3, 1995, it was agreed to convene a committee of experts to discuss a new draft of patent law treaty prepated by WIPO. Such committee held its first session in Geneva from December 11 to 15, 1995 with the representation of 67 states members of WIPO or the Paris Union, and representatives of European Communities, the European Patent Office, the Organization of African Unity and the World Trade Organization as observers.

The treaty negotiations lasted another four years until, in September 1999, during the Thirty-Fourth Series of Meetings of the WIPO Assembly of Member States, a resolution was adopted to convene a diplomatic conference for the adoption of the Patent Law Treaty (PLT).

The Diplomatic Conference for the Adoption of the PLT was held in Geneva, Switzerland from May 11 to June 2, 2000. The Patent Law Treaty was adopted on June 1, 2000 and opened for signature on June 2, 2000. That day, 47 countries signed.

=== Adoption process per country ===
==== France ====
Prior to the entry into force of the treaty in France, a bill was submitted on 14 January 2009 at the French Senate proposing the ratification of the PLT by France. In March 2009, a report from French Senator Rachel Mazuir recommended the ratification of the PLT, as soon as possible, by France. On 24 July 2009, the government was authorized to ratify the PLT. The PLT then entered into force for France on 5 January 2010.

==== United States ====
The Treaty was transmitted from the President to the Senate in 2006. The Senate Foreign Relations Committee issued its Executive Report 110-6 in November 2007. Non-self-executing portions of the PLT were implemented as statute by the Patent Law Treaties Implementation Act of 2012, Pub. Law 112-211 (Dec. 12, 2012). The PLT was ratified by the United States on 18 September 2013, and the ratification instrument was forwarded to WIPO. The Patent Office's implementing regulations were proposed at 78 Fed. Reg. 21788 (Apr. 11, 2013) and issued as a Final Rule at 78 Fed. Reg. 62367 (Oct. 21, 2013).

==== Mexico ====
Article 20(7)(3) of the proposed new NAFTA, in December 2019, stated that "Each Party shall give due consideration to ratifying or acceding to the PLT, or, in the alternative, shall adopt or maintain procedural standards consistent with the objective of the PLT".

== Contracting parties ==
Contracting States to the Patent Law Treaty and dates of entry into force
Contracting Party	Signature	Instrument	In Force
Albania	—	Accession: February 17, 2010	May 17, 2010
Algeria	June 2, 2000	—	—
Antigua and Barbuda	—	Accession: March 25, 2019	June 25, 2019
Armenia	—	Accession: June 17, 2013	September 17, 2013
Australia	—	Accession: December 16, 2008	March 16, 2009
Austria	June 2, 2000	—	—
Bahrain	—	Accession: September 15, 2005	December 15, 2005
Belarus	—	Accession: July 21, 2016	October 21, 2016
Belgium	June 2, 2000	—	—
Bosnia and Herzegovina	—	Accession: February 9, 2012	May 9, 2012
Brazil	June 2, 2000	—	—
Burkina Faso	May 11, 2001	—	—
Burundi	June 2, 2000	—	—
Canada	May 21, 2001	Ratification: July 30, 2019	October 30, 2019
Ivory Coast	July 20, 2000	—	—
Croatia	June 2, 2000	Ratification: December 20, 2004	April 28, 2005
Cuba	June 2, 2000	—	—
Czech Republic	June 2, 2000	—	—
North Korea	June 2, 2000	Ratification: May 22, 2018	August 22, 2018
Denmark	June 2, 2000	Ratification: March 16, 2004	April 28, 2005
Estonia	June 2, 2000	Ratification: April 14, 2003	April 28, 2005
Eswatini	June 2, 2000	—	—
Eurasian Patent Organization	—	Accession: December 17, 2025	March 17, 2026
European Patent Organisation	May 17, 2001	—	—
Finland	—	Accession: December 6, 2005	March 6, 2006
France	September 14, 2000	Ratification: October 5, 2009	January 5, 2010
Gambia	June 2, 2000	—	—
Germany	May 29, 2001	—	—
Ghana	June 2, 2000	—	—
Greece	June 2, 2000	—	—
Haiti	June 2, 2000	—	—
Hungary	June 2, 2000	Ratification: December 12, 2007	March 12, 2008
Ireland	May 31, 2001	Ratification: February 27, 2012	May 27, 2012
Israel	June 2, 2000	—	—
Italy	June 2, 2000	—	—
Japan	—	Accession: March 11, 2016	June 11, 2016
Kazakhstan	—	Accession: July 19, 2011	October 19, 2011
Kenya	June 2, 2000	—	—
Kyrgyzstan	June 2, 2000	Ratification: April 24, 2002	April 28, 2005
Latvia	June 2, 2000	Ratification: March 12, 2010	June 12, 2010
Lebanon	June 2, 2000	—	—
Liberia	June 2, 2000	Ratification: October 4, 2016	January 4, 2017
Liechtenstein	—	Accession: September 18, 2009	December 18, 2009
Lithuania	—	Accession: November 3, 2011	February 3, 2012
Luxembourg	June 2, 2000	—	—
Madagascar	June 2, 2000	—	—
Malawi	June 2, 2000	—	—
Monaco	June 28, 2000	—	—
Montenegro	—	Accession: December 9, 2011	March 9, 2012
Netherlands	May 31, 2001	Ratification: September 27, 2010	December 27, 2010
Nigeria	June 2, 2000	Ratification: December 19, 2002	April 28, 2005
North Macedonia	—	Accession: January 22, 2010	April 22, 2010
Oman	—	Accession: July 16, 2007	October 16, 2007
Poland	June 2, 2000	—	—
Portugal	June 2, 2000	—	—
Moldova	June 2, 2000	Ratification: September 27, 2001	April 28, 2005
Romania	June 2, 2000	Ratification: January 28, 2005	April 28, 2005
Russia	—	Accession: May 12, 2009	August 12, 2009
San Marino	October 10, 2000	—	—
São Tomé and Príncipe	June 2, 2000	—	—
Saudi Arabia	—	Accession: May 3, 2013	August 3, 2013
Serbia	—	Accession: May 20, 2010	August 20, 2010
Slovakia	—	Accession: July 16, 2002	April 28, 2005
Slovenia	June 2, 2000	Ratification: May 8, 2002	April 28, 2005
Spain	June 2, 2000	Ratification: August 6, 2013	November 6, 2013
Sudan	June 2, 2000	—	—
Sweden	May 17, 2001	Ratification: September 27, 2007	December 27, 2007
Switzerland	June 2, 2000	Ratification: March 31, 2008	July 1, 2008
Togo	June 2, 2000	—	—
Turkey	June 2, 2000	—	—
Turkmenistan	—	Accession: April 19, 2021	July 19, 2021
Uganda	June 2, 2000	—	—
Ukraine	—	Accession: March 31, 2003	April 28, 2005
United Kingdom	June 2, 2000	Ratification: December 22, 2005	March 22, 2006
United States	June 2, 2000	Ratification: September 18, 2013	December 18, 2013
Uzbekistan	—	Accession: April 19, 2006	July 19, 2006
Zambia	June 2, 2000	—	—

== See also ==
- Paris Convention for the Protection of Industrial Property
- Patent Cooperation Treaty (PCT)
- Substantive Patent Law Treaty (SPLT)
- Treaty on Intellectual Property, Genetic Resources and Associated Traditional Knowledge (GRATK)
- European Convention relating to the Formalities required for Patent Applications (1953)
- Trademark Law Treaty (1994)
- Design Law Treaty
- Singapore Treaty on the Law of Trademarks
