= European Convention on Recognition and Enforcement of Decisions concerning Custody of Children and on Restoration of Custody of Children =

1980 Council of Europe treaty

- Parties: Blue
- Signed: 20 May 1980
- Location: Luxembourg
- Effective: 1 September 1983
- Condition: 3 ratifications
- Signatories: 35
- Parties: 37
- Depositary: Secretary General of the Council of Europe
- Languages: English and French

The European Convention on Recognition and Enforcement of Decisions concerning Custody of Children and on Restoration of Custody of Children is an international treaty of the Council of Europe that deals with international child abduction. Like the Hague Abduction Convention it was drafted in 1980 and entered into force in 1983.

Starting 1 March 2005 the European Convention has been largely superseded by the Revised Brussels II Regulation and mostly only operates with countries which are not members of the European Union or in respect to certain orders which pre-date the Revised Brussels II.

Both the Hague Convention and the European Convention have the same purpose; to deter international child abduction and to secure the return of children wrongfully removed or retained from their home country. Although they are both founded on the well recognized principles that decisions regarding the care and welfare of children are best made in the country within which they have the closest connection, and that orders made in that home country should be recognized and enforced in other countries, the two Conventions have different ways of achieving those goals.

The European Convention works on the principle of the mutual recognition and enforcement of orders made in contracting states. Accordingly, there must be in existence an order of a court or other authority with the necessary jurisdiction in a Convention Country, which can be recognized and enforced in the receiving state.

Even prior to the Revised Brussels II, the European Convention was rarely used in abduction cases where a child's return was sought because it only operates where an order already exists. It has more frequent application to the enforcement of access orders.

== See also ==
- International child abduction
- Hague Abduction Convention
- List of Council of Europe treaties
