= European Convention on the Adoption of Children =

- Type: Convention
- Signed: 1967
- Effective: April 1968
- Depositary: Council of Europe
- Languages: English, French

The European Convention on the Adoption of Children (CETS No. 058) is a treaty of the Council of Europe that sets common legal standards for the adoption of children among its member states. Its aim is to ensure that adoptions are carried out in the best interests of the child, while providing legal certainty and harmonisation of national adoption laws.

The convention was originally adopted in 1967 and was revised in 2008 (CETS No. 202, effective September 2011) to reflect changes in family structures, social attitudes, and international child protection standards.

The convention complements other international instruments on child protection and adoption, including the Convention on the Rights of the Child and the Hague Adoption Convention. While the Hague Convention primarily addresses intercountry adoption, the European Convention on the Adoption of Children focuses on substantive standards of adoption law within Europe.

== Content ==
=== Original convention (1967) ===
The original convention established a set of essential and supplementary provisions that Parties undertook to incorporate into their domestic law. It applies not only to the adoption of children from States Parties, but also to the adoption of children originating from other states.

Under the essential provisions, adoption:

- must be granted by a judicial or administrative authority;
- requires the free and informed consent of the child's parents or legal representatives, subject to conditions laid down by law; and
- must be authorised solely in the interests of the child.

The convention further regulated the legal effects of adoption. In particular, following adoption:

- the adopter acquires, in respect of the adopted child, the same rights and obligations as a parent in relation to a child born in lawful wedlock;
- as a general rule, the child may acquire the surname of the adopter;
- in matters of succession, the adopted child is treated as a child of the adopter born in lawful wedlock; and
- acquisition of the nationality of the adoptive parents by the child is facilitated.

In addition to these core rules, the convention contained supplementary provisions to which Parties could give effect voluntarily. These concerned, among other matters, the inclusion of social and legal aspects of adoption in the training of social workers, the possibility of adoption without disclosure of the adopter's identity to the child's family, and the conduct of adoption proceedings in camera.

=== Revised convention (2008) ===
The revised convention sought to take account of social and legal developments and reaffirming that the best interests of the child must take precedence over all other considerations.

It introduced a number of new or strengthened provisions, including:

- the requirement of the father's consent in all cases, including where the child was born out of wedlock;
- the requirement of the child's consent where the child has sufficient understanding;
- the extension of eligibility to adopt to heterosexual unmarried couples who have entered into a registered partnership in states that recognise such institutions, while leaving states free to extend adoption to same-sex couples or same-sex partners living together in a stable relationship;
- a revised balance between the adopted child's right to know their origins and the right of the biological parents to remain anonymous; and
- minimum age requirements for adopters, set between 18 and 30 years, with a preferred minimum age difference of at least 16 years between adopter and child.
