= European Convention on Nationality =

1997 Council of Europe treaty

- Signed: 6 November 1997
- Location: Strasbourg
- Effective: 1 March 2000
- Condition: 3 ratifications
- Parties: 21
- Citations: ETS 166
- Languages: English; French

The European Convention on Nationality (E.T.S. No. 166) was signed in Strasbourg on 6 November 1997. It is a comprehensive convention of the Council of Europe dealing with the law of nationality. The convention is open for signature by the member States of the Council of Europe and the non-member States which have participated in its elaboration and for accession by other non-member States. The Convention came into force on 1 March 2000 after ratification by 3 countries. As of 2021, the convention has been signed by 29 countries and ratified by 21 of those countries.

== Provisions ==
Article 4(d) provides that neither marriage nor dissolution of marriage shall automatically affect the nationality of either spouse, nor shall a change of nationality by one spouse during marriage automatically affect the nationality of their spouse. Common practice among states at the beginning of the 20th century was that a woman was to have the nationality of her husband; i.e., upon marrying a foreigner the wife would automatically acquire the nationality of her husband, and lose her previous nationality. Even after the nationality of a married woman was no longer dependent on the nationality of her husband, legal provisions were still retained which automatically naturalised married women, and sometimes married men as well. This led to a number of problems, such as loss of the spouses' original nationality, the spouse losing the right to consular assistance (since consular assistance cannot be provided to nationals under the jurisdiction of a foreign state of which they are also nationals), and becoming subject to military service obligations. Article 4d addresses this situation.

Article 5 provides that no discrimination shall exist in a state's internal nationality law on the grounds of "sex, religion, race, colour or national or ethnic origin". It also provides that a state shall not discriminate amongst its nationals on the basis of whether they hold their nationality by birth or acquired it subsequently.

Article 6 relates to the acquisition of nationality. It provides for nationality to be acquired at birth by descent from either parent to those born within the territory of the state. (States may exclude partially or fully children born abroad.) It also provides for nationality by virtue of birth in the territory of state; however, states may limit this to only children who would otherwise be stateless. It requires the possibility of naturalisation, and provides that the period of residence required for eligibility cannot be more than ten years lawful and habitual residence. It also requires to "facilitate" the acquisition of nationality by certain persons, including spouses of nationals, children of its nationals born abroad, children one of whose parents has acquired the nationality, children adopted by a national, persons lawfully and habitually resident for a period before the age of eighteen, and stateless persons and refugees lawfully and habitually resident on its territory.

Article 7 regulates the involuntary loss of nationality. It provides that states may deprive their nationals of their nationality in only the cases of voluntary acquisition of another nationality, fraud or failure to provide relevant information when acquiring nationality, voluntary military service in a foreign military force, or adoption as a child by foreign nationals. It also provides for the possibility of loss of nationality for nationals habitually residing abroad. Finally, it provides loss of nationality for "conduct seriously prejudicial to the vital interests of the State Party".

Article 8 provides nationals with the right to renounce their nationality, providing they do not thereby become stateless. States may however restrict this right with respect to nationals residing abroad.

== Status ==
Countries that: Ratified Signed, not ratified Not signed Non-members of the Council of Europe

As of 14 March 2014, the following countries have signed or ratified the convention:

Status of the European Convention on Nationality
Signatory	Signed	Ratified	In force
Albania	✓	✓	✓
Austria	✓	✓	✓
Bosnia and Herzegovina	✓	✓	✓
Bulgaria	✓	✓	✓
Croatia	✓		
Czech Republic	✓	✓	✓
Denmark	✓	✓	✓
Finland	✓	✓	✓
France	✓		
Germany	✓	✓	✓
Greece	✓		
Hungary	✓	✓	✓
Iceland	✓	✓	✓
Italy	✓		
Latvia	✓		
Luxembourg	✓		
Malta	✓		
Moldova	✓	✓	✓
Montenegro	✓	✓	✓
Netherlands	✓	✓	✓
Norway	✓	✓	✓
Poland	✓		
Portugal	✓	✓	✓
Romania	✓	✓	✓
Russia	✓		
Slovakia	✓	✓	✓
Sweden	✓	✓	✓
North Macedonia	✓	✓	✓
Ukraine	✓	✓	✓
