= Multilateral treaty =

Treaty between 3 or more sovereign states

A multilateral treaty or multilateral agreement is a treaty to which two or more sovereign states are parties. Each party owes the same obligations to all other parties, except to the extent that they have stated reservations. Examples of multilateral treaties include the Convention Relating to the Status of Refugees, the United Nations Convention on the Law of the Sea, the Geneva Conventions, and the Rome Statute of the International Criminal Court.

== Relationship to bilateral treaties ==
A bilateral treaty is a treaty between two states. A bilateral treaty may become a multilateral treaty when additional new parties succeed or accede to it. Pope Francis argues in his encyclical letter Fratelli tutti (2020) that "preference should be given to multilateral agreements between states, because, more than bilateral agreements, they guarantee the promotion of a truly universal common good and the protection of weaker states.

== Plurilateral treaties ==
A plurilateral treaty is a special type of multilateral treaty. A plurilateral treaty is a treaty between a limited number of states with a particular interest in the subject of the treaty. The primary difference between a plurilateral treaty and other multilateral treaties is that the availability of reservations is more limited under a plurilateral treaty. Due to the limited nature of a plurilateral treaty, the full cooperation of the parties to the treaty is required in order for the object of the treaty to be met. As a result, reservations to plurilateral treaties are not allowed without the consent of all other parties to the treaty. This principle is codified in international law by article 20(2) of the Vienna Convention on the Law of Treaties:

When it appears from the limited number of the negotiating states and the object and purpose of a treaty that the application of the treaty in its entirety between all the parties is an essential condition of the consent of each one to be bound by the treaty, a reservation requires acceptance by all the parties.

An example of a plurilateral treaty is the Antarctic Treaty, signed on 1 December 1959.

== See also ==
- List of multilateral free trade agreements
