= London Naval Conference =

The London Naval Conference may refer to:

- The London Naval Conference 1908–1909, which promulgated a declaration on the laws of naval warfare
- The London Naval Conference 1930, which produced the London Naval Treaty
- The London Naval Conference 1935, which produced the Second London Naval Treaty

== See also ==
- Naval conference (disambiguation)
- London Conference (disambiguation)
- Treaty of London (disambiguation)
