= Treaty of London =

The Treaty of London or London Convention or similar may refer to:

- First Treaty of London (1358), a peace treaty between England and France which lapsed shortly after it was signed
- Second Treaty of London (1359), a peace treaty between England and France which the French did not ratify
- Treaty of London (1474), an alliance between England and Burgundy against France
- Treaty of London (1518), a non-aggression pact between Burgundy, France, England, the Holy Roman Empire, the Netherlands, the Papal States and Spain
- Treaty of London (1604), a conclusion of the Anglo-Spanish War
- Treaty of London (1641), between England and Scotland
- Treaty of London (1700), also known as the Second Partition Treaty
- Convention of London (1786), which allowed British settlers in Belize to cut and export timber
- Convention of London (1814), or the Anglo-Dutch Treaty of 1814, which returned some colonies to the Netherlands
- Treaty of 1818 or London Convention of 1818, between the United States of America and the United Kingdom
- Treaty of London (1824) or Anglo-Dutch Treaty of 1824, which resolved disputes from the 1814 treaty
- Treaty of London (1827), an alliance between Britain, France, and Russia, for the end of Ottoman action in Greece
- Treaty of London (1832), which followed the London Conference of 1832, between Britain, France and Russia, creating an independent Kingdom of Greece
- Treaty of London (1839), which recognised the independence and neutrality of Belgium
- Convention of London (1840), which granted Muhammad Ali Pasha hereditary control over Egypt
- London Straits Convention (1841), which closed the Bosporus and the Dardanelles to warships
- Treaty of London (1854), an alliance between Britain, France and Ottoman Empire against Russian Empire
- Convention of London (1861), between Britain, France and Spain, which agreed upon a course of action towards obtaining loan repayments from Mexico
- Treaty of London (1864), which united the Ionian Islands with Greece
- Treaty of London (1867), which guaranteed the neutrality of Luxembourg
- Treaty of London (1871), between Prussia, Austria, Turkey, Britain and Italy, which reversed the neutralization of the Black Sea
- London Convention (1884), between the United Kingdom and the South African Republic
- Treaty of London (1890), between the United Kingdom, the German Empire and the Kingdom of Portugal, over territorial claims in Southern Africa
- Convention for the Preservation of Wild Animals, Birds and Fish in Africa (1900)
- Treaty of London (1913), which ended the First Balkan War
- Treaty of London (1915), between the Entente powers and the Kingdom of Italy
- London Naval Treaty (1930), which established limits on naval fleets and construction programmes
- Convention Relative to the Preservation of Fauna and Flora in their Natural State (1933)
- London Convention on the Definition of Aggression (1933)
- Second London Naval Treaty (1936), which furthered naval arms control limits
- Anglo-Soviet Treaty, signed in London on 26 May 1942
- London Protocol (1944), agreement between the Allies of World War II on dividing Germany into three occupation zones after the war
- Treaty of London (1945), the legal basis for the Nazi trials
- Treaty of London (1946), which ended the British mandate over Transjordan
- Treaty of London (1949), which created the Council of Europe
- Treaty of London (1956), which promised independence to British Malaya
- London Convention on the Prevention of Marine Pollution by Dumping of Wastes and Other Matter (1972)
- Convention on Limitation of Liability for Maritime Claims, agreed in London, 1976

== See also ==
- Anglo-Dutch Treaty (disambiguation)
- Anglo-Irish Treaty (1921), which established a semi-independent Irish Free State
- Jay Treaty (1794), between Britain and the US, to resolve various issues arising from the 1776 American Revolution
- London Agreement (disambiguation)
- London Declaration (disambiguation)
- London Protocol (disambiguation)
- List of conferences in London
- List of treaties
