= List of conferences in London =

List of conferences in London (chronological):

- London Conference of 1830 – guaranteed the independence of Belgium
- London Conference of 1832 – convened to establish a stable government in Greece
- London Conference of 1838–1839 – preceded the Treaty of London (1839)
- London Conference of 1847 – Establishment of the Communist League
- London Conference of 1852
- London Conference of 1864 (25 April 1864 – 25 June 1864) – establishing Armistice and negotiations about Peace in Second Schleswig War
- London Conference of 1866 – the final in a series of conferences that led to Canadian Confederation
- London Conference of 1867 – preceded the Treaty of London (1867)
- London Conference of 1881 – French anarchist movement
- First Pan-African Conference (1900)
- 2nd Congress of the Russian Social Democratic Labour Party (1903) – Bolshevik-Menshevik split
- London Conference of 1908
- London Naval Conference 1908–1909
- London Conference of 1912–1913 – also known as the London Peace Conference
- London Conference of 1914 – was scheduled in August by London bankers and was supposed to avoid an escalation that led to World War I; conference never took place
- Conference of London (1920) – discussion of the partitioning of the Ottoman Empire
- London Conference of 1921 – about German reparations
- Conference of London (1921–1922) – dealing with the Treaty of Sèvres
- London Naval Conference 1930
- First London Naval Treaty (1930)
- Round Table Conferences (India) (1930). Followed by two further conferences in 1931 and 1932
- London Economic Conference (1933)
- London Naval Conference 1935
- Second London Naval Disarmament Conference (1935)
- Second London Naval Treaty (1936)
- London Conference (1939) – on Palestine
- London Conference of 1945 – set out the rules of procedure for the Nuremberg Trials; the official document which resulted was the London Charter of the International Military Tribunal
- London Conference of 1946–47 – on the future of Palestine
- London 6-Power Conference (1948) – post-WW-II conference of the Western Allies
- London Conference of 1954 – one of two related conferences to determine the status of West Germany
- London Conference of 1959
- London Conference of 1964 – peace talks between the Turkish Cypriots and the Greek Cypriots
- London Conference (1995)
- London Conference on Nazi Gold (1997)
- International Conference on Afghanistan (2006) – 31 January 2006, the Government of Afghanistan presented its Interim National Development Strategy and launched the Afghanistan Compact
- International Conference on Afghanistan (2010) – 28 January 2010: international conference trying to find a new Afghanistan Compact
- London Conference on Libya – 29 March 2011
- London Conference on Somalia – 23 February 2012
- London Conference on the Illegal Wildlife Trade – 13 February 2014
- London Conference on Intelligence – 2014-2017: private conference for research on human intelligence, including race and intelligence and eugenics. The conference was moved to Skanderborg, Denmark in 2018.
- London Conference on the Illegal Wildlife Trade – 2018

== See also ==
- London Naval Conference (disambiguation)
- London Agreement (disambiguation)
- London Declaration (disambiguation)
- London Protocol (disambiguation)
- Treaty of London (disambiguation)
