= Anglo-Dutch Treaty =

Anglo-Dutch Treaty may refer to:

- Anglo-Dutch Treaty of 1814, also known as the Convention of London
- Anglo-Dutch Slave Trade Treaty, 1818 treaty
- Anglo-Dutch Treaty of 1824, also known as the Treaty of London
- Anglo-Dutch Gold Coast Treaty (1867), 1867 treaty
- Anglo-Dutch Treaties of 1870–1871, three related treaties
