= London Declaration (disambiguation) =

The London Declaration was a declaration issued by the 1949 Commonwealth Prime Ministers' Conference.

London Declaration may also refer to:

- The London Declaration concerning the Laws of Naval War (1909)
- The Declaration of St James's Palace (1941)
- The London Declaration on Combating Antisemitism (2009)
- The London Declaration for Global Peace and Resistance against Extremism (2011)
- The London Declaration on Neglected Tropical Diseases (2012)

== See also ==
- List of conferences in London
- London Agreement (disambiguation)
- London Protocol (disambiguation)
- Treaty of London (disambiguation)
