= Naval conference =

Naval conference can refer to:

- London Naval Conference (1908–1909)
- Washington Naval Conference, 1921–1922
- Geneva Naval Conference, 1927
- London Naval Conference 1930, leading to the London Naval Treaty
- London Naval Conference 1930, leading to the Second London Naval Treaty

== See also ==
- London Naval Conference (disambiguation)
