= London Protocol =

London Protocol can refer to one of many treaties signed in London, England:

== Treaties ==
- Eight Articles of London (1814), secret protocol awarding the territory of modern Belgium and the Netherlands to William I of the Netherlands
- London Protocol (1828), statement of war aims of European powers in Greek War of Independence
- London Protocol (1829), amendment of protocol of 1828 expanding Greek borders
- London Protocol (1830), recognized Greece as an independent, sovereign state
- London Protocol (1832), ratified and reiterated terms of Treaty of Constantinople
- London Protocol (1852), altered succession of duchies of Schleswig and Holstein to maintain personal union with Denmark
- London Protocol (1862), reiterated terms of Anglo-Japanese Treaty of Amity and Commerce
- London Protocol (1877), British pledge of neutrality in Russo-Turkish War in exchange for limitation of Russian war aims
- London Protocol (1944), Allied agreement to divide Nazi Germany into three occupation zones after World War II
- 1996 Protocol to the London Convention on the Prevention of Marine Pollution by Dumping of Wastes and Other Matter (1972), international agreement limiting dumping of hazardous waste at sea
- London Agreement (2000), reduced requirements to translate patents granted under European Patent Convention, entered into force in 2008

== Other uses ==
- London Protocol (2004), protocol established at Imperial College London for responding to clinical incidents

== See also ==
- London Agreement (disambiguation)
- London Declaration (disambiguation)
- List of conferences in London
- Treaty of London (disambiguation)
