= London Declaration =

1949 Commonwealth document about India

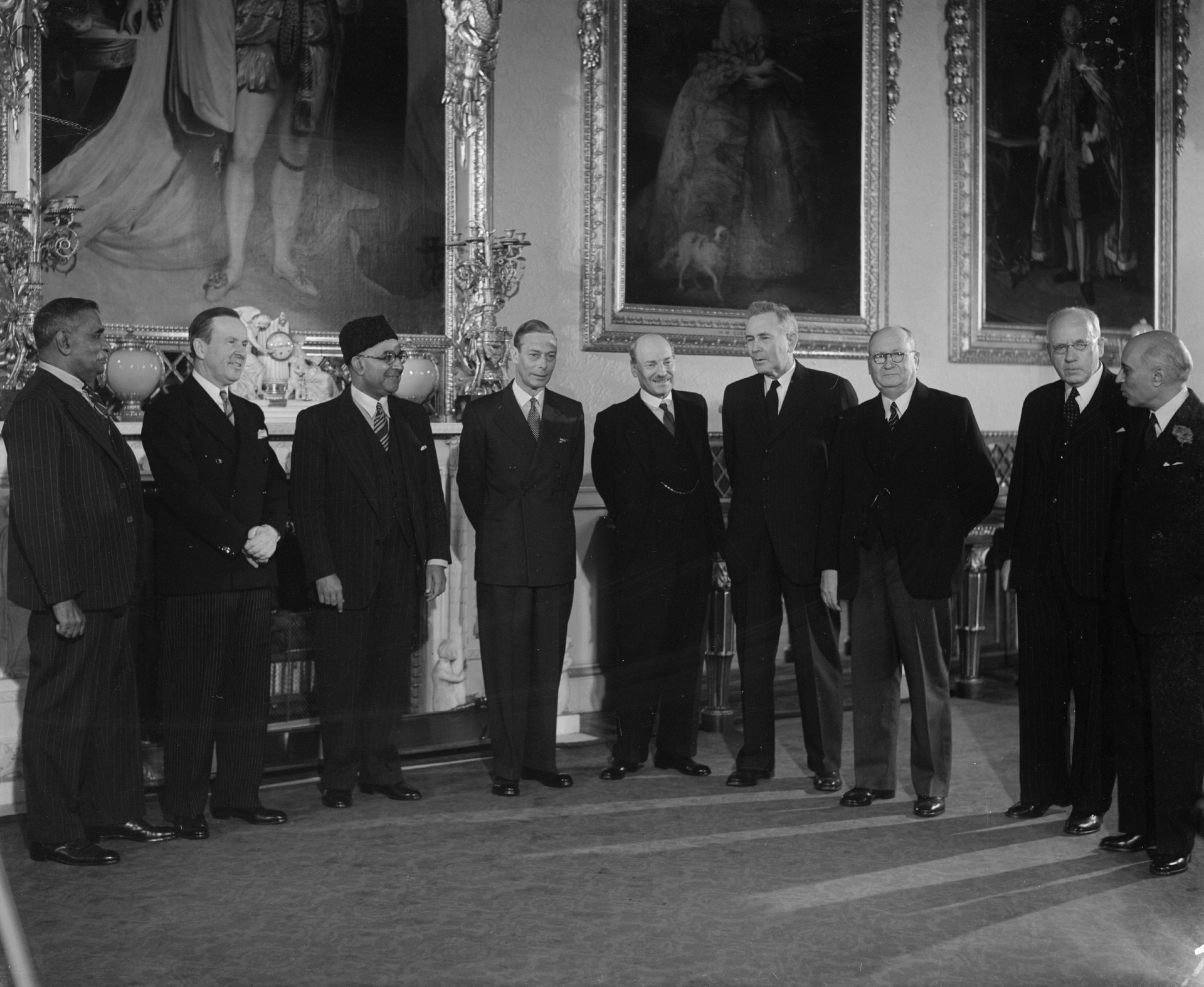
The Commonwealth Prime Ministers with the King at Buckingham Palace for the Commonwealth Prime Ministers' Conference, 1949.

The London Declaration was issued by the 1949 Commonwealth Prime Ministers' Conference regarding India's continued membership of the Commonwealth of Nations, an association of independent states formerly part of the British Empire, in anticipation of India's transition to a republican constitution.

The declaration was drafted jointly by V. K. Krishna Menon, a constitutional advisor to Prime Minister Jawaharlal Nehru, and Sir Norman Brook, the British Cabinet secretary. The declaration stated the prime ministers' agreement to India's continued membership in the organization after it became a republic. By that declaration, the Government of India had expressed its acceptance of the King as a symbol of the free association of its independent member nations and head of the Commonwealth.

The declaration dealt only with India, which was considered an exceptional case, and reaffirmed that the other members of the Commonwealth owed a common allegiance to the Crown, with an initial acceptance of the King as the head of the Commonwealth. However, it did establish a precedent that republicanism is compatible with membership in the organization. The London Declaration marked the birth of the modern Commonwealth of Nations.

== History ==
The declaration stated vis-à-vis India:

The Government of India have ... declared and affirmed India's desire to continue her full membership of the Commonwealth of Nations and her acceptance of the King as the symbol of the free association of its independent member nations and as such the Head of the Commonwealth.

This formula has since been deemed a sufficient precedent for all other countries.

The issue had been discussed at the 1948 Prime Ministers' Conference, whose agenda was dominated by the imminent decisions of two states—India and Ireland—to declare themselves republics. At the meeting, Indian Prime Minister Jawaharlal Nehru proposed a Ten Point Memorandum on the settlement between India and the Commonwealth. The Cabinet Committee on Commonwealth Relations recognised that Nehru's proposals could not constitute a basis for continued Commonwealth membership and that a further conference would be required.

On 16 May 1949, during the Constituent Assembly Debates for the composition of a republican constitution, Nehru declared in the assembly that:

We join the Commonwealth obviously because we think it is beneficial to us and to certain causes in the world that we wish to advance. The other countries of the Commonwealth want us to remain there because they think it is beneficial to them. It is mutually understood that it is to the advantage of the nations in the Commonwealth and therefore they join. At the same time, it is made perfectly clear that each country is completely free to go its own way; it may be that they may go, sometimes go so far as to break away from the Commonwealth...Otherwise, apart from breaking the evil parts of the association, it is better to keep a co-operative association going which may do good in this world rather than break it.

At the next conference, in April 1949, Nehru, seeking above all to avoid two-tiered membership, conceded a more agreeable three-point programme, based upon common Commonwealth citizenship, a declaration of India's continued membership, and recognition of the monarch in a separate capacity than that as monarch. This met general agreement, particularly with the new South African Premier Daniel François Malan, and, during the next two days, the draft was crafted into a final agreement. To avoid criticism about eliminating the word British from the name of the Commonwealth, Nehru conceded a reference to the "British Commonwealth of Nations" in the opening paragraph of the document as an historically appropriate reference.

News of the agreement was hailed by all those of the opposition party in the British House of Commons, including Winston Churchill and Clement Davies. By contrast, Jan Smuts, who had been defeated by Malan in the South African general election the previous year and was considered second only to Churchill as a Commonwealth statesman, was strongly opposed. In the South African context, with which Smuts was mainly concerned, republicanism was mainly identified with Afrikaner conservatism and with tighter racial segregation. The London conference – concerned mainly with India and, to some degree, with Ireland, which had recently declared itself a republic – paid little attention to the implications for South Africa.

India became a republic in 1950 and remained a member of the Commonwealth. However, Ireland, which was in the same situation, having passed The Republic of Ireland Act 1948, declared itself a republic on 18 April 1949, ten days before the declaration, and therefore quit the Commonwealth.

== Text of the Declaration ==
The Governments of the United Kingdom, Canada, Australia, New Zealand, South Africa, India, Pakistan and Ceylon, whose countries are united as Members of the British Commonwealth of Nations and owe a common allegiance to the Crown, which is also the symbol of their free association, have considered the impending constitutional changes in India.

The Government of India have informed the other Governments of the Commonwealth of the intention of the Indian people that under the new constitution which is about to be adopted India shall become a sovereign independent republic. The Government of India have however declared and affirmed India's desire to continue her full membership of the Commonwealth of Nations and her acceptance of The King as the symbol of the free association of its independent member nations and as such the Head of the Commonwealth.

The Governments of the other countries of the Commonwealth, the basis of whose membership of the Commonwealth is not hereby changed, accept and recognise India's continuing membership in accordance with the terms of this declaration.

Accordingly the United Kingdom, Canada, Australia, New Zealand, South Africa, India, Pakistan and Ceylon hereby declare that they remain united as free and equal members of the Commonwealth of Nations, freely co-operating in the pursuit of peace, liberty and progress.

== See also ==
- Commonwealth of Nations membership criteria
- London Declaration (disambiguation)
