= Mixed Commission Court =

A Mixed Commission Court was a joint court set up by the British government with Dutch, Spanish or Portuguese representation following treaties agreed in 1817 and 1818. By 1820 there were six such courts. This occurred during a period often referred to as Pax Britannica, a period of British hegemony following the defeat of the Napoleonic Empire.The different courts condemned more than 600 ships and they released almost 80.000 slaves. The establishment of the Caribbean courts meant a new stage in the fight against slavery, a stage configurated through bilateral agreements, which provided legal security and involved at least in intention the slave powers. Besides, the location of the courts and the fate of the emancipated were very influenced by the actions against the slave trade emanating from the Vice admiralty Courts, their predecessors.

== Courts ==
- Anglo-Portuguese court in Rio de Janeiro, Brazil – after Brazilian independence in 1822 this became an Anglo-Brazilian court which operated until 1845
- Anglo-Spanish court in Havana, Cuba
- Anglo-Dutch court in Suriname
- Anglo-Portuguese, Anglo-Spanish and Anglo-Dutch courts in Freetown, Sierra Leone. The Vice Admiralty Court, Sierra Leone had been founded in 1807 following the passing of the Abolition of the Slave Trade Act. This court was superseded by the Mixed Commission Court in 1817. The Court was located in a building in Gloucester Street previously used to house the Governor.

=== Anglo-Portuguese Courts ===
During the Congress of Vienna on 21 January 1815 the British agreed to pay the Portuguese Prince Regent £300,000 in reparations for Portuguese ships seized by the British "cruizers" prior to 1 June 1814, on the basis that they were engaged in the slave trade. The next day they entered into a further treaty which prohibited Portuguese ships from engaging in the slave trade along the coast of Africa north of the equator.This was tied to a loan of £600,000 and the treaty was to be ratified within five months. Over two years later on 28 July 1817 an Additional Convention was added which included the first provision for Mixed Commissions formed of an equal number of individuals of the two nations. One was to be located in a British possession and the other in a Portuguese possession, with one on the coast of Africa, and the other on the coast of Brazil. A further Mixed Commission was also set up on a similar basis in London. While the treaty allowed Portuguese slave traders to continue their business south of the equator, the trade was forbidden to the north. The £300,000 mentioned in 1815 had not been paid, but the British agreed to pay it in two instalments of £150,000, as well as 5% interest since the earlier convention in January 1815. Full documentation of the treaty was to be available in English and Portuguese on all British ships. Further regulations governing the Mixed Commissions:

- Each commission was to have two Commissary Judges and two Commissioners of Arbitration, in both cases one appointed by each country.
- The host country shall provide a registrar who would keep records of the Commission's activities.
- The judges should examine the documents of the seized ship and question the captain and key crew members as well as the person who seized the ship before declaring whether the ship had been seized lawfully or not. If they could not agree, one of the Commissioners of Arbitration would be chosen by lot and after further discussion the matter would be resolved by the majority of the three people.
- Where the court determined that the ship should be liberated, the relevant parties could claim damages. However if the vessel was condemned, the enslaved Africans on board would be delivered to the government which owned the territory where the court was located to be employed as servants or free labourers. The ship and any other goods would be sold by public sale with the proceeds being split between the two governments.

=== Anglo-Dutch Courts ===
These were established by the Anglo-Dutch Slave Trade Treaty of 1818. The Mixed Commission Court in Freetown sentenced in total 22 Dutch vessels during its existence between 1819 and 1862. The Mixed Commission Court in Paramaribo sentenced only one vessel during its existence between 1819 and 1845, namely, the Nueve of Snauw in 1823.

=== Anglo Spanish Courts ===
These courts were established by the Anglo-Spanish treaty of 1817 in Sierra Leone and in La Habana. The Sierra Leone Court was the most important and in the case of the Spanish vessels, it sentenced from its start in 1819 to 1845, 251 vessels that carried out more than 25.000 slaves. The Havana Court sentenced between 1824 and 1841 an amount of 10.391 slaves. Many of these slaves were abused after their emancipation.
