= Treaty of London (1518) =

1518 non-aggression pact between major European nations

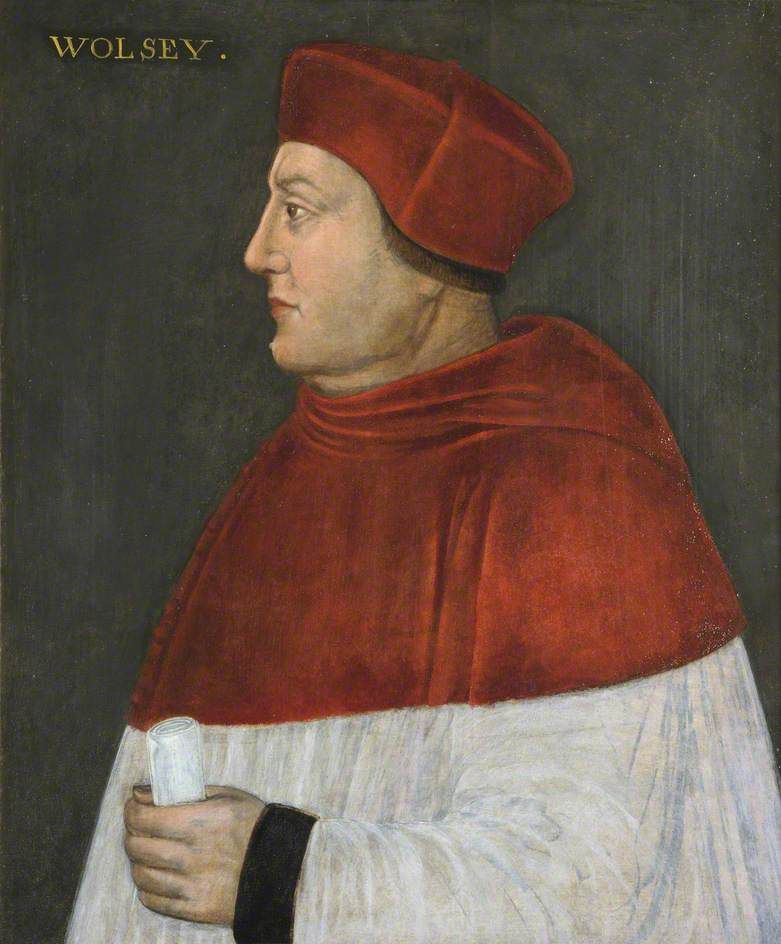
Cardinal Wolsey, the principal designer of the Treaty of London (1518)

The Treaty of London (Dutch: Verdrag van Londen, French: Traités de Londres, Italian: Trattato di Londra, Spanish: Tratado de Londres) in 1518 was a non-aggression pact between the major European states. The signatories were France, England, the Holy Roman Empire, the Netherlands, the Papal States and Spain, all of whom agreed not to attack one another and to come to the aid of any that were under attack.

The treaty was designed by Cardinal Wolsey and so came to be signed by the ambassadors of the nations concerned in London. Pope Leo X originally called for a five-year peace while the monarchs of Europe helped him fight back the rising power of the Ottoman Empire, which was encroaching into the Balkans. Wolsey was very keen on instead making lasting peace and persuaded Henry VIII to avoid war and to take a more diplomatic route in foreign affairs.

== Background ==
In the 15th century, peace was established for 50 years in the Italian Peninsula, which was divided into many small city-states. Only the small War of Ferrara between the Republic of Venice and the Papal States for the control of Ferrara caused a temporary lapse in the peace.

The mostly-peaceful period came to an end with the French invasion of 1494. A succession of small wars followed, and in 1518, the political possibilities of a peace treaty seemed a realisation.

== Terms ==
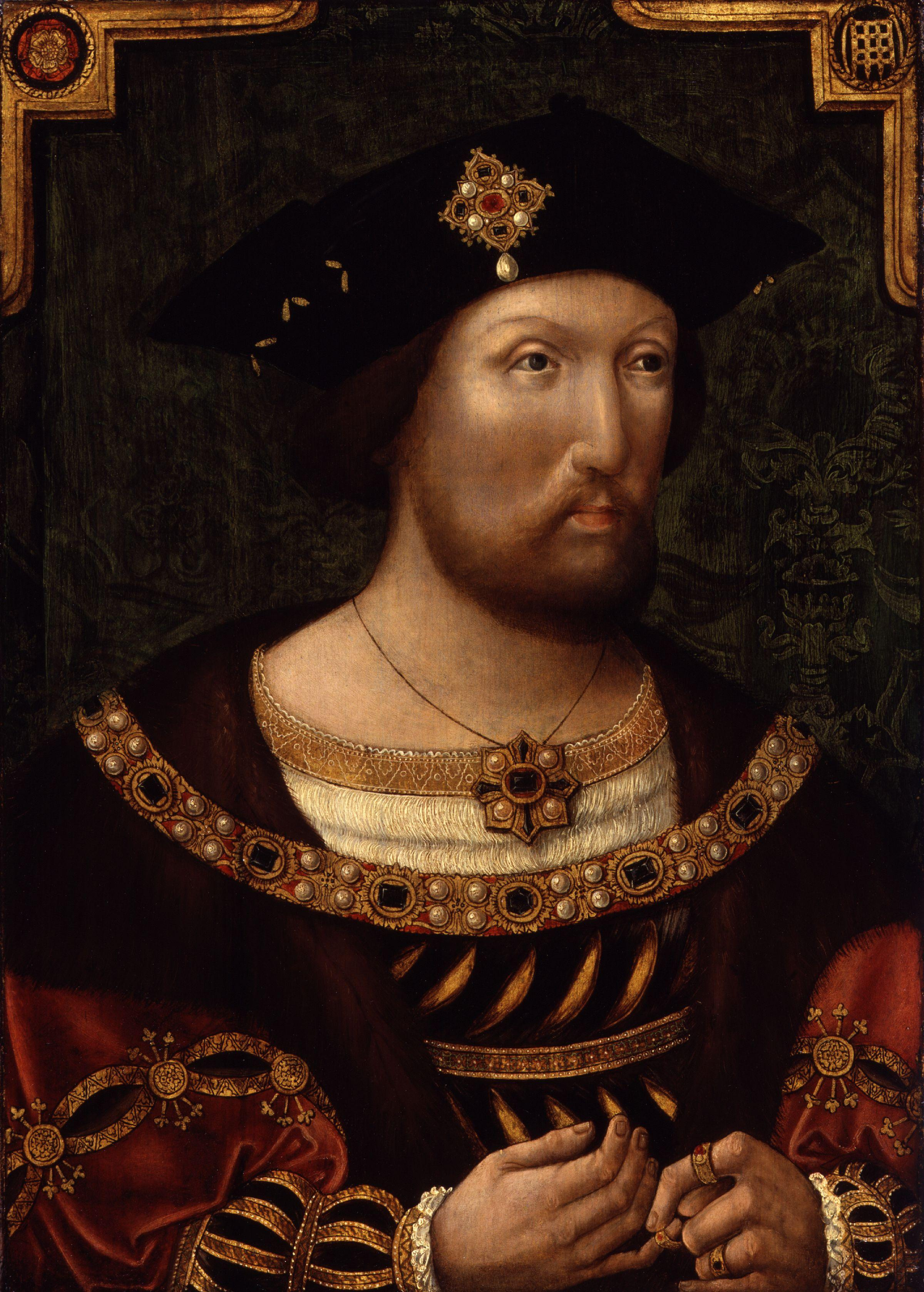
The 1518 Treaty reflected considerable glory upon the reign of King Henry VIII (depicted c. 1520).

All countries in Europe were invited to London, excluding the Grand Principality of Moscow and the Ottoman Empire. The treaty hoped to bind the 20 leading states of Europe into peace with one another and thus end warfare between the states of Europe.

In October 1518, the Treaty was initiated between representatives from England and France. It was then ratified by other European states and the Pope. The agreement established a defensive league based upon certain terms. The central tenet was that states with an active foreign policy needed to commit to a stance of non-aggression. As a corollary tenet, signatory states also needed to promise to make war collectively upon any state that broke the terms of the treaty.

At the time, the Treaty was considered a triumph for Thomas Wolsey. It allowed Henry VIII to increase his standing greatly in European political circles.

== Legacy ==
The peace the treaty brought was very brief. Wars broke out in a few years, including wars between Denmark and Sweden and also an alliance of England and Spain against France. The peace movement, however, continued for next centuries and became part of the Enlightenment movement in the 18th century.

Some historians have been skeptical that the signatories of the treaty genuinely intended to comply with the commitments of the treaty, while other historians have argued that there was a genuine sense of Christian unity at the time and a common sense of threat posed by the Ottoman Empire.

== See also ==
- List of treaties
- Treaties of London
- George of Poděbrady for an earlier proposal of similar nature
