= Treaty of London (1946) =

1946 treaty between the United Kingdom and Transjordan

- Type: Bilateral treaty
- Signed: 22 March 1946
- Location: London, England, UK
- Original signatories: United Kingdom; Transjordan
- Ratifiers: United Kingdom; Transjordan

The Treaty of London was signed between the United Kingdom and the Emirate of Trans-Jordan on 22 March 1946 and came into force on 17 June 1946.

The treaty concerned the sovereignty and independence of the Arab state of Transjordan (officially written as Trans-Jordan), which would now be known as the Hashemite Kingdom of Transjordan, with Emir Abdullah I as its king. However, Britain would still maintain military bases within the country and continue to subsidise and support the Arab Legion, as the treaty was designed to give Britain as much freedom of action as possible.

The Treaty of London superseded the former Anglo-Transjordan mandate, the Organic Law of 1928. This former mandate liberalised several restrictions on Transjordan. However, the United Kingdom controlled financial matters and most foreign policy issues. It was then considered a step towards future independence.

Transjordan's impending independence was recognised on 18 April 1946 by the League of Nations during the last meeting of that organisation.

On 25 May 1946, Transjordan became the "Hashemite Kingdom of Transjordan" when the ruling 'Amir' was re-designated as 'King' by the parliament of Transjordan on the day it ratified the Treaty of London. 25 May is still celebrated as independence day in Jordan. However, officially the mandate for Transjordan ended on 17 June 1946 when, in accordance with the Treaty of London, the ratifications were exchanged in Amman and Transjordan gained full independence.

When King Abdullah applied for membership in the newly formed United Nations, his request was vetoed by the Soviet Union, citing that the nation was not "fully independent" of British control. This resulted in another treaty in March 1948 with Britain in which all restrictions on sovereignty were removed. Despite this, Jordan only became a full member of the United Nations on 14 December 1955 as part of a wider compromise in which 16 countries joined on the same day.

== See also ==
- List of treaties
- Treaties of London
- Jordan–United Kingdom relations
