= London Agreement =

The London Agreement may refer to one of the following agreements signed in London:

- The Anglo-German Naval Agreement (1935), which regulated the size of the Kriegsmarine in relation to the Royal Navy
- The London Charter of the International Military Tribunal (1945), which set down the laws and procedures by which the Nuremberg trials were to be conducted
- The London Agreement of 1949, which established the International Authority for the Ruhr
- The London Agreement on German External Debts (1953)
- The London-Zürich Agreements (1959), regarding Cyprus
- The Peres–Hussein London Agreement (1987), signed by Shimon Peres and King Hussein of Jordan
- The London Agreement (2000), which relates to the language provisions under the European Patent Convention

== See also ==
- London Declaration (disambiguation)
- London Protocol (disambiguation)
- List of conferences in London
- Treaty of London (disambiguation)
