= London Conference on the Illegal Wildlife Trade =

International conference in London (2014, 2018)

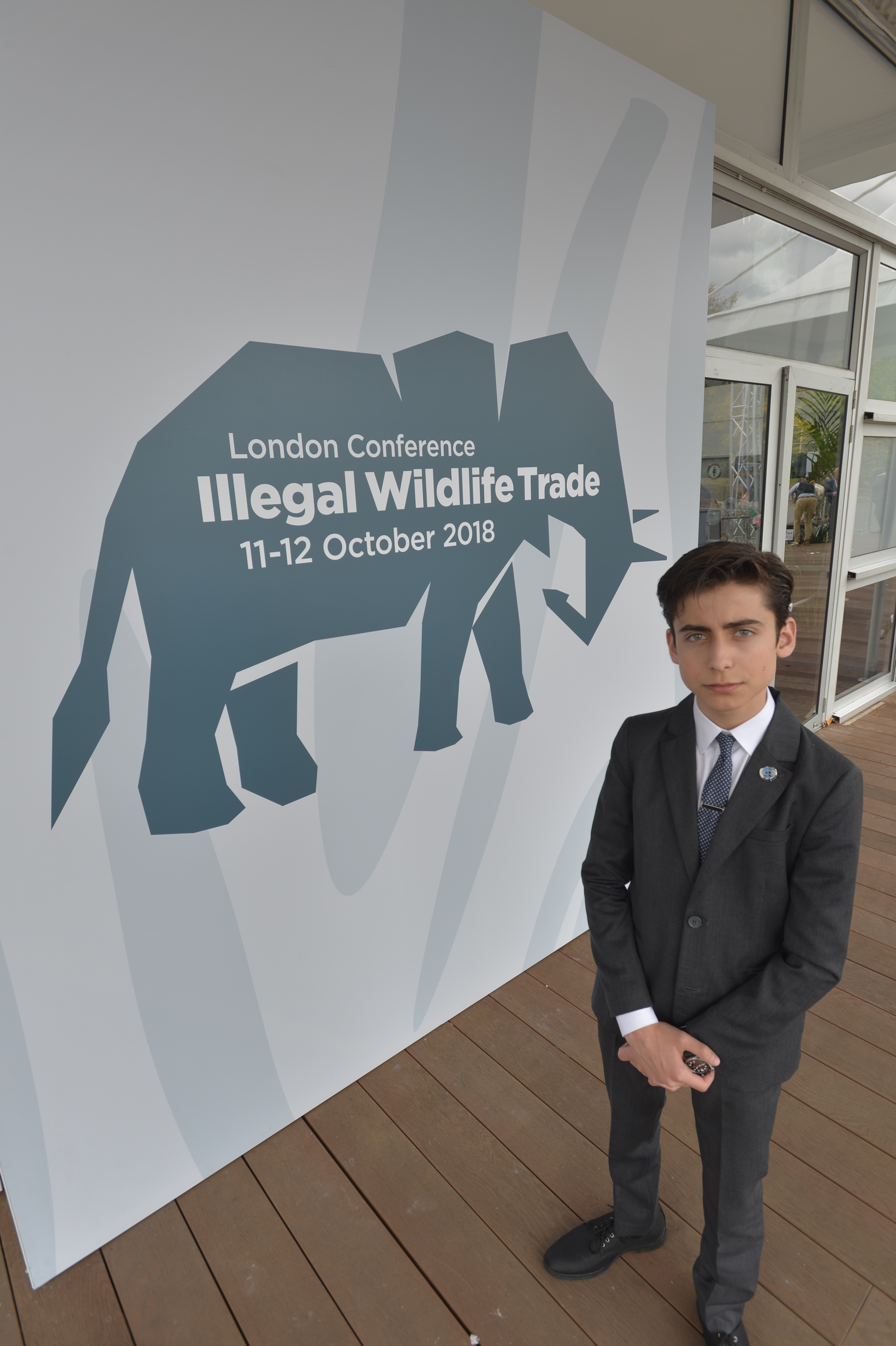
Aidan Gallagher, UN Environment Goodwill Ambassador

The London Conference on the Illegal Wildlife Trade was an international conference held on 12–13 February 2014 in London. A declaration to protect wildlife was signed by 46 countries and 11 international organizations. The declaration calls for increasing enforcement of laws against poaching, reducing demand for wildlife products, and the "sustainable utilization" of wildlife.

It was held again 11–12 October 2018.
