= London Declaration concerning the Laws of Naval War =

International code of maritime law

The London Declaration concerning the Laws of Naval War was a proposed international code of maritime law, especially as it relates to wartime activities, in 1909 at the London Naval Conference by the leading European naval powers, the United States and Japan, after a multinational conference that occurred in 1908 in London. The declaration largely reiterated existing law, but dealt with many controversial points, including blockades, contraband and prize, and showed greater regard to the rights of neutral entities.

The declaration was signed by most of the great powers of the day: Austria-Hungary, France, Germany, Italy, Japan, Russia, the United Kingdom, and the United States. (It was also signed by the Netherlands and Spain.) However, no state ever ratified the declaration and consequently it never came into force. The United States insisted that the belligerent nations fighting in World War I abide by the Declaration, while the British and Germans increasingly ignored it.

The British geostrategist and naval historian Sir Julian Corbett argued strongly against the provisions of the Declaration, which sought to outlaw 'general capture' of enemy commerce on the high seas during wartime. In his earlier 1907 essay 'The Capture of Private Property at Sea', he argued that the curtailment of the Royal Navy's right to seize enemy shipping would have a detrimental impact on Britain's ability to wage economic warfare against a continental enemy, economic warfare being the single most important function of the Navy, in his view. The arguments he set out gained currency within the Navy and British government, and would eventually prevail with Britain's decision not to ratify the Declaration and the successful waging of maritime economic warfare, including 'general capture', against Germany during the First World War.

In any case, the London Declaration was greatly deficient in referring only to surface ships and completely ignoring submarine warfare, which was to play a major role in both World Wars.

== See also ==
- 1856 Declaration of Paris, similar treaty that was also violated during WWI.
