= History of the Jews in Leipzig from 1933 to 1939 =

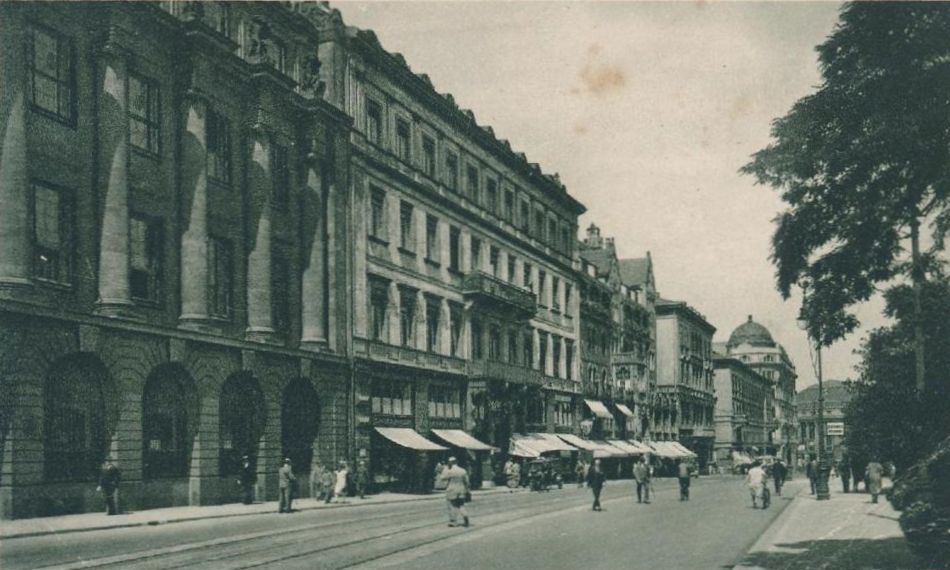
Leipzig in 1933

Leipzig is the largest city in the German state of Saxony, and one of the largest cities in Germany. It is located in the northern half of Germany, south of Berlin. The history of Leipzig from 1933 to 1939, is affected by the actions of the Nazi regime. From the beginning of the Nazi Party's rise to power in 1933, to the beginning of World War II in 1939, Leipzig was an important city to the regime. Thousands of Jews were transported to and from this city as Adolf Hitler's plans for the Jewish people evolved. Between the years of 1933 to 1939, Jews suffered from the implementation of over 400 anti-Jewish policies, laws, and regulations. However, other than the history of the Holocaust, Leipzig has a rich Jewish history and culture.

== 1933 ==
Relations were strengthened with south-eastern European countries once the Nazis rose to power, because Nazi leaders orchestrated agreements and under-hand deals. Because of Germany's relatively large size compared to other European countries, it was easier to gain economic power in trade, especially the power they had from the Leipzig Trade Fair, and use that as leverage to force countries like Yugoslavia, Romania, and Bulgaria to tolerate German power. Eventually, after the Nazi party's rise to power in 1933, the Trade Fair was no longer as valuable to Nazi Germany and its economy because it relied on foreign goods to maintain its military strength. As the Nazi party began implementing anti-Jewish policies and expelling Jews, mainly male, from their high positions in the arts and academics, Jewish women began to lead the households, maintain the mental health of her family members, and urge them to immigrate and escape the evils coming. April 7, 1933 the Law for the Restoration of the Professional Civil Service was passed by Nazi leaders. This law allowed for the dismissal of Jews and other "politically unreliable" people from their positions in civil service including lawyers and doctors. The Saxon Ministry for Popular Education issued a directive to the schools of Leipzig, Germany in April 1933 that effectively called for the further segregation of Jews and "Aryans" in school that would later lead to more a more violent separation between the groups.

== 1934 ==
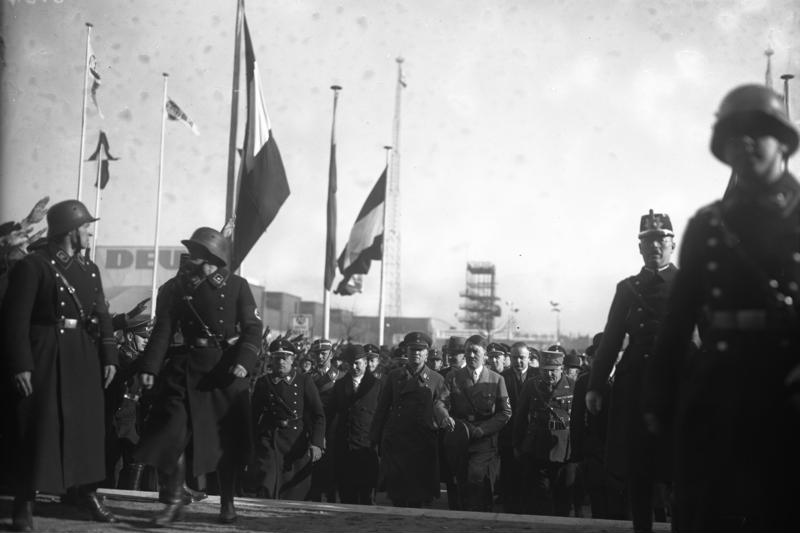
Adolf Hitler and Martin Mutschmann at the Leipzig Trade Fair in 1934

At the Leipzig Trade Fair in 1934, the Economics Minister and Reichbank director, Hjalmar Schacht, included the agreements and deals from the 1933 Nazi rise to power in the New Plan for foreign trade. Adolf Hitler was determined to rearm the German military lead to foreign crises regarding foreign currency, but his determination harmed the economy. It was only the Leipzig Trade Fair that saved the German economy; because of its established reputation and network among other European countries, Germany was able to regulate trade licenses and prioritize importation to ultimately improve their exportation success and prevent further deficit. As the economy worsened, so did tensions for the Jews. Because of activity that was deemed rebellious or against the Nazi regime, 1,600 people were arrested in Leipzig towards the end of 1934. Jewish youth in various youth groups were prohibited from wearing uniforms and displaying pennants like their "Aryan" peers to help create a distinction between "Aryan" and "non-Aryan". This rampant antisemitism caused Jews to flee the country. Eight hundred Jews emigrated from Leipzig to Palestine between the years of 1933 and 1935 to seek freedom from their religious persecution and escape the Nazi regime. To combat the antisemitic policies and decrees, Jews joined together in an attempt to save their culture. In December, over 575 Jews made up the Cultural Organization of the German Jews, or Kulturbund Deutscher Juden Ortsgruppe Leipzig as it later became known as, which was an organization dedicated to keeping Jewish culture alive and providing an outlet to Jews whose lifestyles were being stifled.

== 1935 ==
Nazi propaganda infiltrated the city and served as a reminder to Jews that they were inferior, and advertisements to Aryan Germans of a better Germany. Later, the Nuremberg Laws were passed in 1935. These included two laws designed to further the divide between the Nazi Aryan race and Jews and to allow for the legal persecution of Jews. The Reich Citizenship Law was the first of the Nuremberg Laws which stripped Jews of their German citizenship and the Law for Protection of German Blood and German Honor was the second of the Nuremberg Laws which outlawed the union of a Jew and a German through marriage. Later, all Jews were expelled from schools in the state of Saxony by order of the Saxon education ministry and were to be transferred to various religious schools. On June 8, 1935 Jews were banned from all public baths and pools. In October, the Gemeinde, a German township, created a "Lehrhaus" to accommodate the Jewish children who were barred from public academics and extracurriculars. The Lehrhaus had taken on most of the duties relating to education and it allowed exiled Jewish scholars to act as teachers.

== 1936 ==
The divide between Jewish children and "Aryan" children was deepened in 1939 when "Aryan" schoolchildren were directed, "to hold their nose if they meet a Jew in the street, because the Jews stink fearfully." The synagogues in Leipzig were threatened in September when the Leipzig police force responded to complaints by the Gemeinde about the amount of synagogues in Leipzig by calling in a lawyer to help them shut them down. By 1936, the activities of the Kulturbund was shut down and it was required that they be approved by the Managing Director of the National Chamber of Culture, or Geschäftsführer of the Reichskulturkammer, after Wilhelm Gustloff, the head of the Foreign Section of the Swiss NSDAP, was assassinated by the Jewish David Frankfurter. This organization was another way for the Nazis to control the lives of the Jewish people by regulating their culture and activities. Jews were accused of being too political during one of their worship services and were thus barred from practicing their religion in any Gemeinde hall. By 1936, many Rabbis had fled the country and emigrated to other European nations so they could freely practice their faith.

== 1937 ==
The Ministry of Education, along with the Berlin and Leipzig deans of the philosophy sector, discussed the higher education of Jews and concluded that since Jews were allowed to attend college, they were allowed the right to earn a doctorate degree. However, on April 15, 1937, this conclusion lead to a decision made by the Minister of Education, that outlawed Jews from obtaining a doctorate degree. The Gestapo notified the two members of Gemeinderrabbiner, Goldschimdt and David Ochs, that Leipzig had too many synagogues and advised that they be shut down before then were closed by force. Eventually, even youth meetings were banned.

== 1938 ==
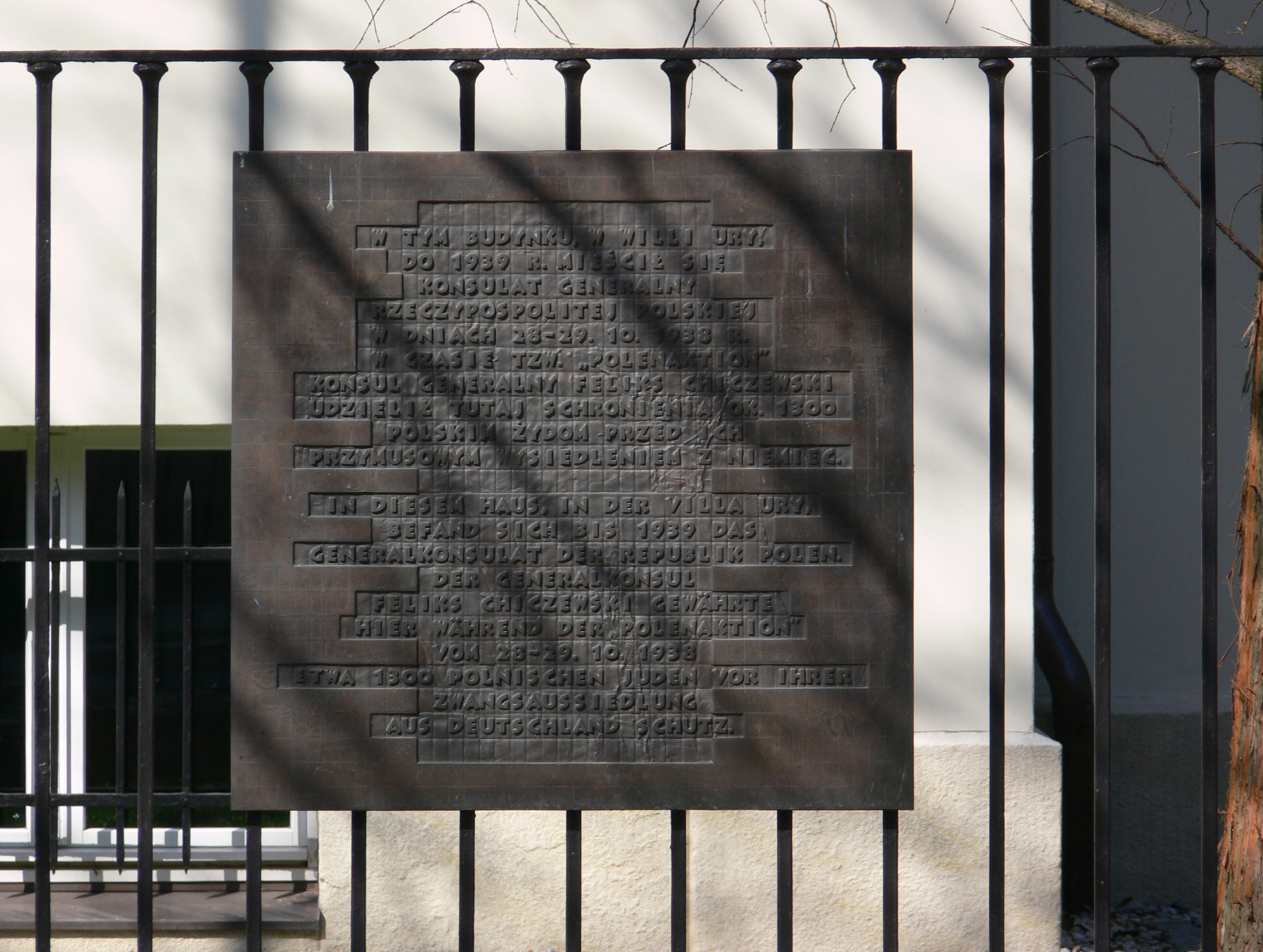
Memorial plaque at the former Polish Consulate, where 1,300 Polish Jews found shelter in 1938

Several south-eastern countries such as Yugoslavia, Bulgaria, Romania, Greece, and Hungary all began selling products in Leipzig by 1938 which helped Germany follow through with its promise to prioritize importation which in turn helped to improve the German economy. Yugoslavia began selling higher priority items at the Leipzig Trade Fair in the late 1930s and increased its participation in the fair. Further segregation was implemented as police force requested that benches in the Rosenthal be reserved for Aryans only and marked as such. The Orthodox Rabbi, David Ochs spoke at the Lehrhaus and urged his audience of 700 Jews to emigrate to Palestine by speaking of the educational and religious freedoms it offered. In October 1938, the authorities initiated the expulsion of Polish Jews from Germany. The Polish Consulate sheltered 1,300 Polish Jews, preventing their deportation. Kristallnacht, an attack on the Jews of Germany and Austria, occurred in November and forever changed the lives of Jews in Leipzig by opening their eyes to the true antisemitic opinions of their neighbors. November 1938 is when the deportation of German Jews began. Jews and other non-Germans were prohibited by the German government from holding positions in the Gemeinde in early April which resulted in the loss of 51 of the 149 members. By 1939, 22% of the Jews in Leipzig were expelled, detained, or removed by other means.

== 1939 ==
Hungary, Bulgaria, Romania, and Yugoslavia made up 15% of the total amount of foreign participants at the Leipzig Trade Fair by 1939. Throughout the 1930s, the Leipzig Trade Fair and Germany's close relations with the south-eastern countries saved it from complete economic collapse and also allowed for the mobilization of Nazi Germany. It was required of the Gestapo to ban Jews from all parks to avoid the "automatic disadvantage" that the presence of Jews causes for the "German-blooded children". The population of Jews in Leipzig dropped from 11,000 in 1933 to 4,470 by 1939. Jews were forced from their homes to homes for Jews called "Judenhaus".

In September 1939 Germany launched the invasion of Poland starting World War II. During the invasion, mass arrests of local Polish activists were carried out in the city (see also Nazi crimes against the Polish nation). The Polish Consulate was seized by Germany. The Polish library of the consulate was confiscated.

== Bibliography ==
- Gross, Stephen (2012). "Selling Germany in South-Eastern Europe: Economic Uncertainty, Commercial Information and the Leipzig Trade Fair 1920-40". Contemporary European History. 21 (1): 19–39. doi:10.1017/S096077731100052X. S2CID 163461376.
- Kaplan, Marion A. Between Dignity and Despair: Jewish Life in Nazi Germany. New York: Oxford University Press (1998).
- Miron, Guy (2013). ""Lately, Almost Constantly, Everything Seems Small to Me": The Lived Space of German Jews under the Nazi Regime". Jewish Social Studies. 20 (1): 121–49. doi:10.2979/jewisocistud.20.1.121. S2CID 151446207.
- von Papen, Maria Patricia. ""Scholarly" Antisemitism during the Third Reich: The Reichsinstitut's Research on the "Jewish Question," 1935–1945." Order No. 9930850, Columbia University (1999).
- Willingham, Robert Allen, II. "Jews in Leipzig: Nationality and Community in the 20th Century." Order No. 3185972 The University of Texas at Austin (2005). Ann Arbor: ProQuest.
