= Anglo-Dutch Slave Trade Treaty =

1818 treaty between the United Kingdom and Netherlands

Treaty between His Britannic Majesty and His Majesty the King of the Netherlands, for preventing their Subjects from engaging in any Traffic in Slaves
- Signed: 4 May 1818
- Location: The Hague, Netherlands
- Parties: United Kingdom; Netherlands
- Languages: English, French

Full text
- Treaty between His Britannic Majesty and His Majesty the King of the Netherlands, for preventing their Subjects from engaging in any Traffic in Slaves at Wikisource

The Anglo-Dutch Slave Trade Treaty (Dutch: Brits-Nederlands verdrag ter wering van de slavenhandel) was a treaty signed between the United Kingdom and the Kingdom of the Netherlands signed on 4 May 1818, aimed at preventing slave trade carried out through Dutch vessels. The treaty allowed both parties to search vessels of the other for on-board slaves. Among other things, the treaty established two Mixed Commission Courts, one with a seat in Freetown, Sierra Leone and another in Paramaribo, Suriname, which had the power to sentence slavers.

The treaty was amended and provided with additional articles by treaties concluded on 31 December 1822, 25 January 1823, 7 February 1837 and 31 August 1848.

== Background ==
In June 1814, William I of the Netherlands, who had been proclaimed Sovereign Prince of the United Kingdom of the Netherlands in 1813 and would become King of the Netherlands on 16 March 1815, forbade Dutch participation in the slave trade by sovereign decree. That was endorsed by the Final Act of the Congress of Vienna on 9 June 1815. It is often argued that William I forbade the slave trade under British pressure, as his return to the Netherlands had not been possible without British support. By abolishing slave trade, William I hoped to regain the Dutch colonies now under British control. That objective was, for the most part, achieved with the Anglo-Dutch Treaty of 1814.

In May 1818, a comprehensive treaty was concluded between the Netherlands and the United Kingdom, which allowed the Royal Navy and the Royal Netherlands Navy to inspect vessels they suspected of carrying slaves. If slaves were indeed found on board, both navies were allowed to detain the crew and bring them before one of the Mixed Courts of Justice.

== Mixed Commission Courts ==
The Mixed Commission Court in Freetown sentenced in total 22 Dutch vessels during its existence between 1819 and 1862.

The Mixed Commission Court in Paramaribo sentenced only one vessel during its existence between 1819 and 1845, namely, the Nueve of Snauw in 1823.
