= Ort der Vielfalt =

Government initiative in Germany

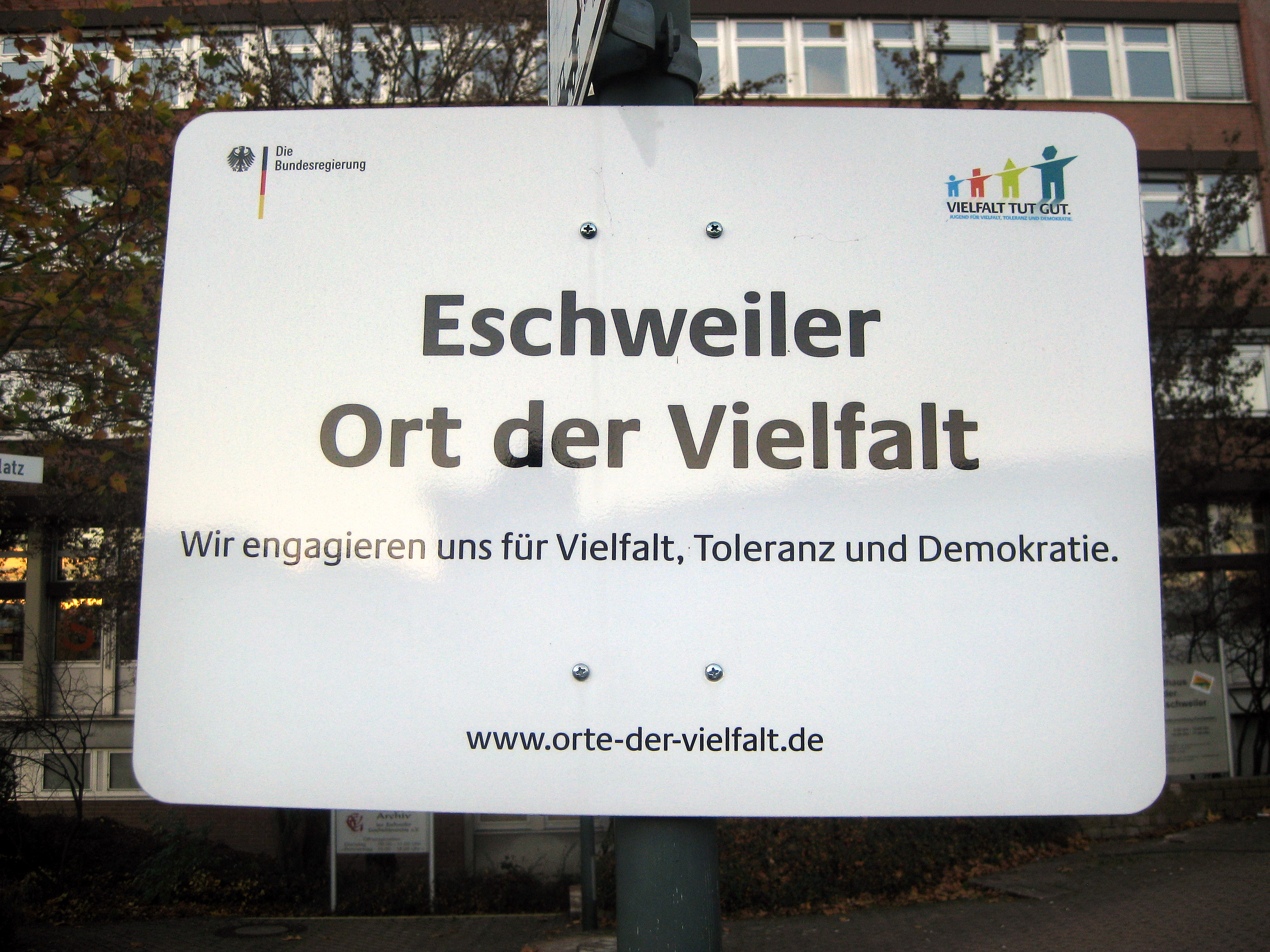
Sign "Ort der Vielfalt" in Eschweiler

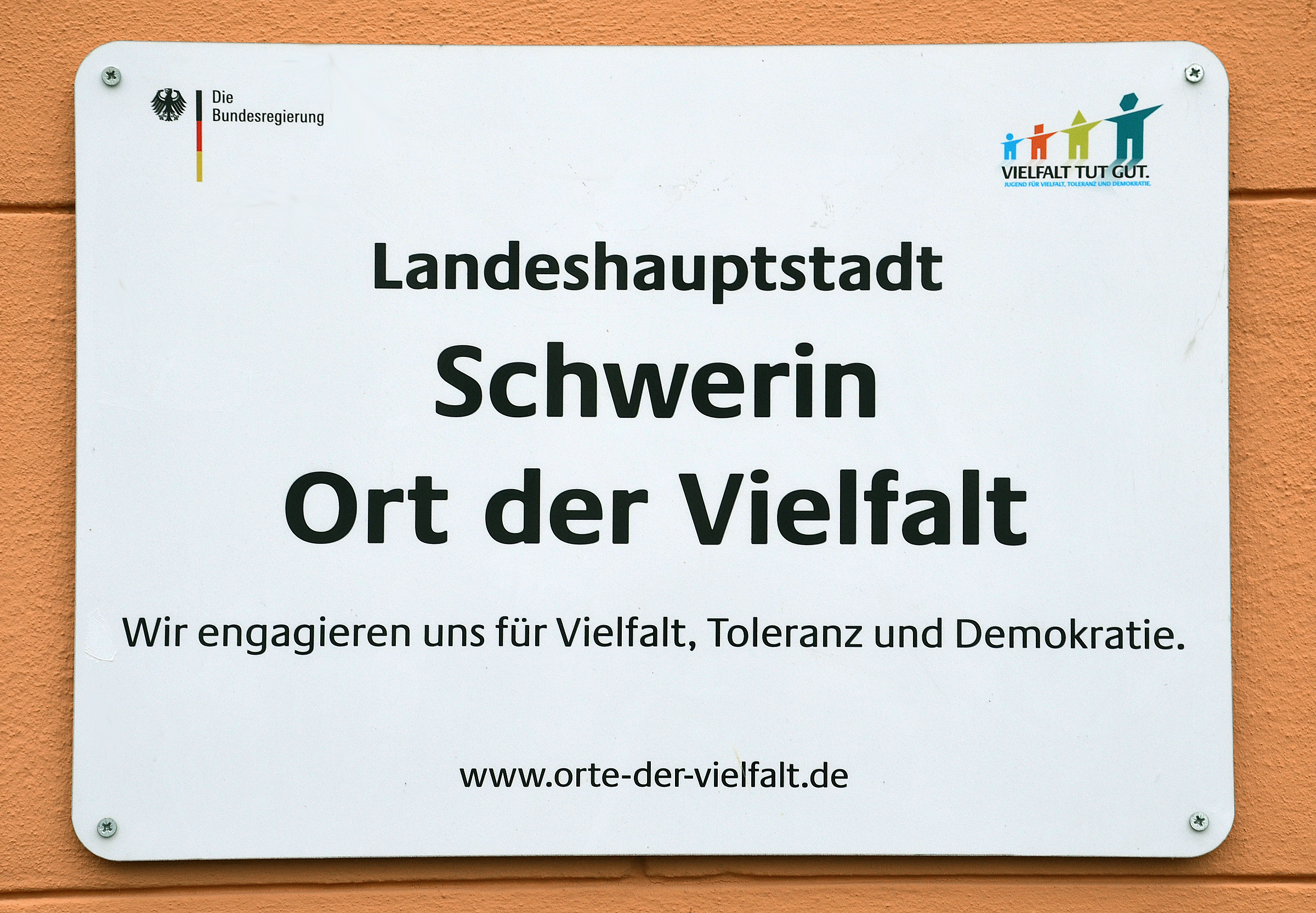
Under the logo "Variety is good. Youth for Diversity, Tolerance and Democracy" the award for Schwerin as "Place of Diversity"

Ort der Vielfalt (German pronunciation: [ˈɔʁt deːɐ̯ ˈfiːlfalt], lit. 'place of diversity') is an initiative launched in 2007 by the Federal Ministry of Family Affairs, Senior Citizens, Women and Youth, the Federal Ministry of the Interior and the Federal Government Commissioner for Migration, Refugees and Integration with the aim of strengthening the commitment of communities, towns and districts in Germany to cultural diversity. This initiative comes from the federal programmes Vielfalt tut gut. Jugend für Vielfalt, Toleranz und Demokratie (German for Variety is good. Youth for diversity, tolerance and democracy) and kompetent. für Demokratie – Beratungsnetzwerke gegen Rechtsextremismus (German for competent. for democracy - advisory networks against right-wing extremism). Since 1 January 2011, the Federal Programme Toleranz fördern – Kompetenz stärken (Promoting Tolerance - Strengthening Competence) has again been continuing the two federal programmes under one roof.

The initiative is supported by the federal states, the local umbrella organisations, business, trade unions and other organisations. Committed communities, towns and districts are awarded a "Place of Diversity" sign.

== List of "Ort der Vielfalt"-municipalities ==
=== Since 23 September 2008 ===
- Altmarkkreis Salzwedel
- Anhalt-Bitterfeld, Landkreis
- Augsburg
- Bad Bentheim
- Bad Wildungen
- Blankenfelde-Mahlow
- Bomlitz
- Bützow
- Dahme-Spreewald, Landkreis
- Darmstadt
- Demmin, Landkreis
- Eberswalde
- Erding
- Erding, Landkreis
- Forchheim, Landkreis
- Freiberg, Region
- Friedrichshain-Kreuzberg, Bezirk in Berlin
- Fürstenwalde/Spree
- Göppingen
- Goslar
- Günzburg, Landkreis
- Halberstadt
- Harz, Landkreis
- Herford
- Herzogenrath
- High Fläming Nature Park
- Kaufbeuren
- Kiel
- Kyffhäuserkreis
- Leipzig
- Lichtenberg, Bezirk in Berlin
- Limburg-Weilburg, Landkreis
- Löbau-Zittau, Region
- Lübben (Spreewald)
- Lüneburg
- Magdeburg
- Minden
- Mittweida, Region
- Muldental, Region
- Murrhardt
- Neukölln, Bezirk in Berlin
- Neumarkt in der Oberpfalz
- Neustadt in Holstein
- Nordhausen
- Oranienburg
- Pankow, Bezirk in Berlin
- Pirna
- Pößneck
- Rehlingen-Siersburg
- Rems-Murr-Kreis
- Riesa
- Rüdersdorf bei Berlin
- Saale-Holzland-Kreis
- Sächsische Schweiz, Region
- Sinsheim
- Sonneberg, Landkreis
- Tempelhof-Schöneberg, Bezirk in Berlin
- Weimar
- Wiesbaden-Biebrich
- Wolgast
- Wunsiedel
- Wuppertal

=== Since 25 May 2009 ===
- Aachen
- Bad Kreuznach
- Bad Langensalza
- Bad Nenndorf
- Bad Pyrmont
- Bamberg
- Bautzen, Landkreis
- Bernkastel-Wittlich, Landkreis
- Blankenburg (Harz)
- Böblingen
- Bremen
- Burg
- Burgenlandkreis
- Calw
- Charlottenburg-Wilmersdorf, Bezirk in Berlin
- Cham (Oberpfalz)
- Cham, Landkreis
- Chemnitz
- Coswig (Sachsen)
- Dorfen
- Dormagen
- Dortmund
- Duisburg
- Düren, Kreis
- Düsseldorf
- Eisenach
- Eisleben
- Elbe-Elster, Landkreis
- Erfurt
- Erlangen
- Eschweiler
- Falkenberg/Elster
- Falkensee
- Görlitz
- Görlitz, Landkreis
- Gröditz
- Halle (Saale)
- Hennigsdorf
- Hohenstücken, Ortsteil in Brandenburg (Havel)
- Jena
- Jülich
- Karlsruhe
- Koblenz
- Köln
- Kusel, Landkreis
- Lauchhammer
- Lauenburg/Elbe
- Lauterbach (Hessen)
- Lehrte
- Lohra
- Lübbenau/Spreewald
- Ludwigshafen am Rhein
- Ludwigslust, Landkreis
- Mansfeld-Südharz, Landkreis
- Marburg
- Marl
- Marzahn-Hellersdorf, Bezirk in Berlin
- Merzig-Wadern, Landkreis
- Miesbach
- Mölln
- Morbach
- Münster
- Nordhorn
- Nordvorpommern, Landkreis
- Osterode am Harz, Landkreis
- Ostprignitz-Ruppin, Landkreis
- Prenzlau
- Pulheim
- Rathenow
- Sulzbach-Rosenberg
- Sächsische Schweiz-Osterzgebirge, Landkreis
- Sangerhausen
- Schönebeck
- Schöneiche bei Berlin
- Schweich an der Römischen Weinstraße
- Schwerin
- Sebnitz-Kirnitzschtal
- Senftenberg
- Starnberg, Landkreis
- Straubing
- Strausberg
- Stuttgart
- Treptow-Köpenick, Bezirk in Berlin
- Trier
- Trier-Saarburg, Landkreis
- Uckermark, Landkreis
- Uecker-Randow, Landkreis
- Vlotho
- Vogtlandkreis
- Unstrut-Hainich-Kreis
- Werder (Havel)
- Wildau
- Wittmund
- Würzburg
- Zwickau

=== Since 10 October 2010 ===
- Hamburg-Mitte (borough of Hamburg)

=== Since 21 October 2010 ===
- Altona, Hamburg
- Amelinghausen (Samtgemeinde)
- Bad Doberan, Landkreis
- Bad Dürkheim
- Bad Liebenwerda
- Birkenfeld
- Braunschweig
- Celle
- Dessau-Roßlau
- Dresden
- Düren
- Eislingen/Fils
- Freital
- Fürth
- Gardelegen
- Großräschen
- Hanau
- Hermannsburg
- Hoyerswerda
- Ilm-Kreis
- Lohne (Oldenburg)
- Mainz
- Mannheim
- Märkisch-Oderland, Landkreis
- Müritz, Landkreis
- Nieder-Olm, Verbandsgemeinde
- Nienburg/Weser
- Nordwestmecklenburg, Landkreis
- Oberspreewald-Lausitz, Landkreis
- Ohrdruf
- Ostalbkreis
- Perleberg
- Quedlinburg
- Rothenburg ob der Tauber
- Saarbrücken
- Schneeberg
- Schorndorf
- Schwalm-Eder-Kreis
- Sulzbach/Saar
- Unterlüß
- Verden an der Aller
- Verden, Landkreis
- Wadern
- Weiden in der Oberpfalz
- Weilburg an der Lahn
- Wernigerode
- Wutha-Farnroda
