= Wöchentliche Zeitung aus mancherley Orten =

German magazine

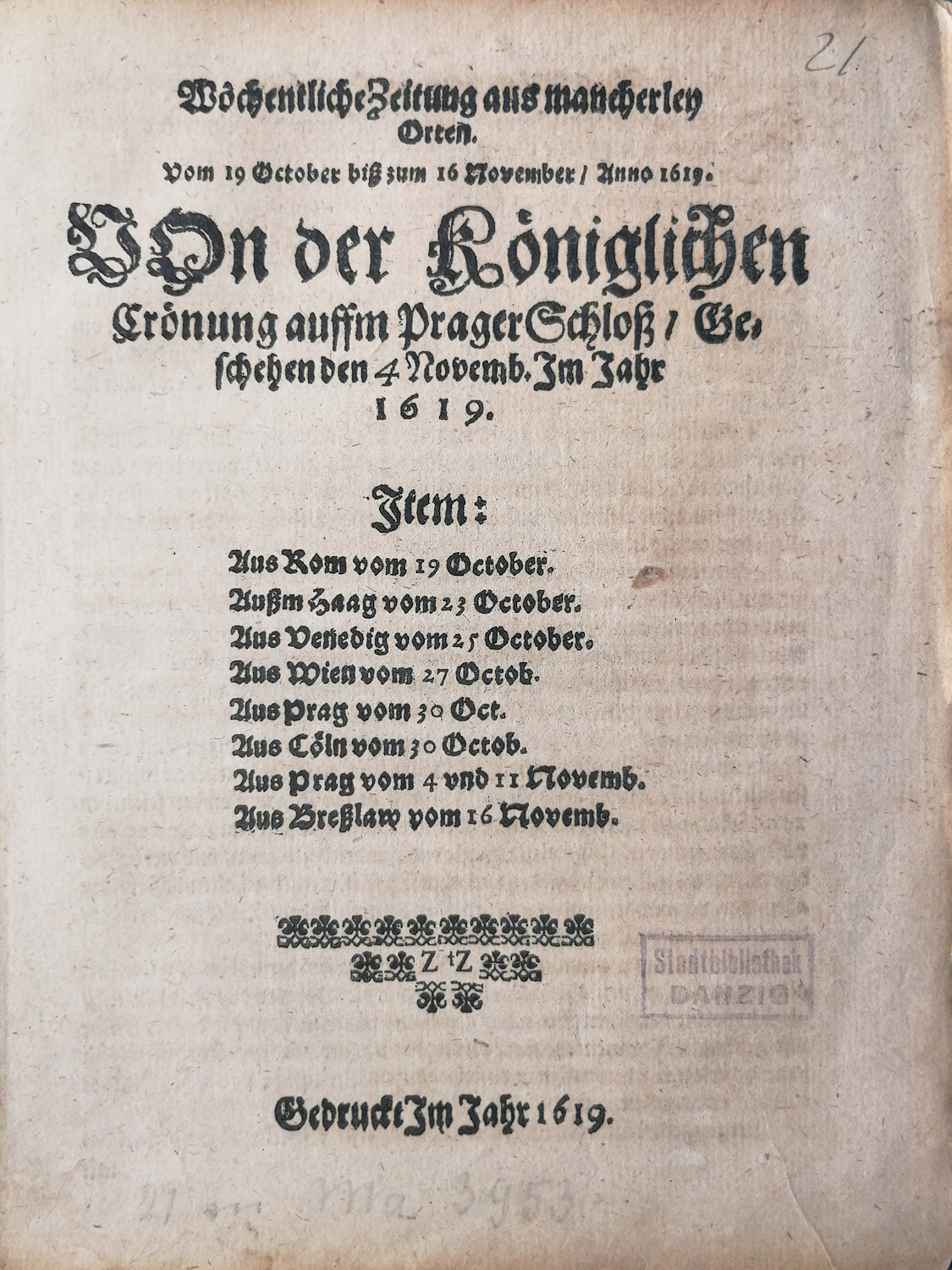
- Wöchentliche Zeitung aus mancherley Orten issue in 1619
- Founded: 1618
- Ceased publication: 1625
- Political alignment: Independent
- Language: German
- Headquarters: Gdańsk, Poland

Wöchentliche Zeitung aus mancherley Orten was a German newspaper published in Gdańsk from 1618 to 1625.
