= Anglo-Dutch Treaty of 1814 =

1814 treaty ending British occupation of Dutch colonies

- Type: Bilateral treaty
- Signed: 13 August 1814; 212 years ago
- Signatories: United Kingdom of Great Britain and Ireland; Sovereign Principality of the United Netherlands

Full text
- Anglo-Dutch Treaty of 1814 at Wikisource

The Anglo-Dutch Treaty of 1814 (also known as the Convention of London; Dutch: Verdrag van Londen) was signed by the United Kingdom and the Netherlands in London on 13 August 1814. It was signed by Lord Castlereagh on behalf of the British government and Hendrik Fagel on behalf of the Dutch government. The treaty restored several of the Dutch colonies occupied by British forces during the Napoleonic Wars, although several others were permanently ceded to Britain. It also included Dutch acknowledgement of British opposition to the Atlantic slave trade and agreements to improve the Low Countries' defences. Disputes arising from the treaty resulted in the signing of the Anglo-Dutch Treaty of 1824.

== Terms ==
=== Colonial possessions ===
The treaty returned many of the Dutch colonies Britain occupied during the Napoleonic Wars to the Netherlands, specifically Surinam, Curaçao, Aruba, Saba, Sint Eustatius, Sint Maarten, Dutch Suratte, Dutch Bengal (with the exception of the district of Bernagore), Dutch Coromandel, Dutch Malacca and the Dutch East Indies. The Dutch agreed to cede several captured colonies to Britain, including the Dutch Cape Colony, Dutch Malabar, Demerara, Essequibo and Berbice. In exchange for the cession of Dutch Malabar, Britain ceded Bangka Island to the Netherlands. Dutch subjects were granted trading rights in Demerara, Essequibo and Berbice, while Britain agreed to pay an annual fee to the Netherlands in exchange for the cession of Bernagore.

=== Cooperation ===
The treaty also included a declaration issued by the Dutch government on 15 June 1814 noting that slave ships were no longer permitted in British-controlled ports. William I of the Netherlands had issued a royal decree in June 1814 which abolished Dutch involvement in the Atlantic slave trade, and the British and Dutch governments were both in agreement regarding their opposition to the trade. Britain and the Netherlands also agreed to spend £2,000,000 each on improving defences in the Low Countries, while a further set of funds, up to £3,000,000, are mentioned for the "final and satisfactory settlement of the Low Countries in union with Holland." Disputes arising from the treaty resulted in the signing of the Anglo-Dutch Treaty of 1824.

== See also ==
- Anglo-Dutch Slave Trade Treaty
- Anglo-Dutch Treaty of 1824
- Anglo-Dutch Treaties of 1870–1871
