= London Naval Conference (1908–1909) =

(First) London Naval Conference
- Date: 4 December 1908 to 26 February 1909
- Location: London
- Participants: United Kingdom, United States, France, Japan and others
- Outcome: Declaration of London made but not effective

The London Naval Conference (4 December 1908 – 26 February 1909) was a continuation of the debates of the 2nd Hague Conference, with the United Kingdom hoping for the formation of an International Prize Court. Ten nations sent representatives, the main naval powers of Europe and the United States and Japan. The conference met from December 4, 1908 to February 26, 1909. The agreements were issued as the Declaration of London, containing seventy-one articles it restated much existing international maritime law.

The signatories' governments did not all ratify the Declaration and it never went into effect. During the First World War the neutral United States under President Wilson pushed for the major antagonists to respect the treaty, hoping that the good protection in the Declaration for neutral vessels would be enforced.

The most influential figures at the conference were Renault of France, Kriege of Germany, and Crowe of Great Britain.
