= London Protocol (1944) =

1944 agreement to divide post-war Germany

In the London Protocol signed on 12 September 1944, the Allies of World War II (then without France) agreed on dividing Germany into three occupation zones after the war.

== History ==
=== The 1st EAC Zone Protocol ===
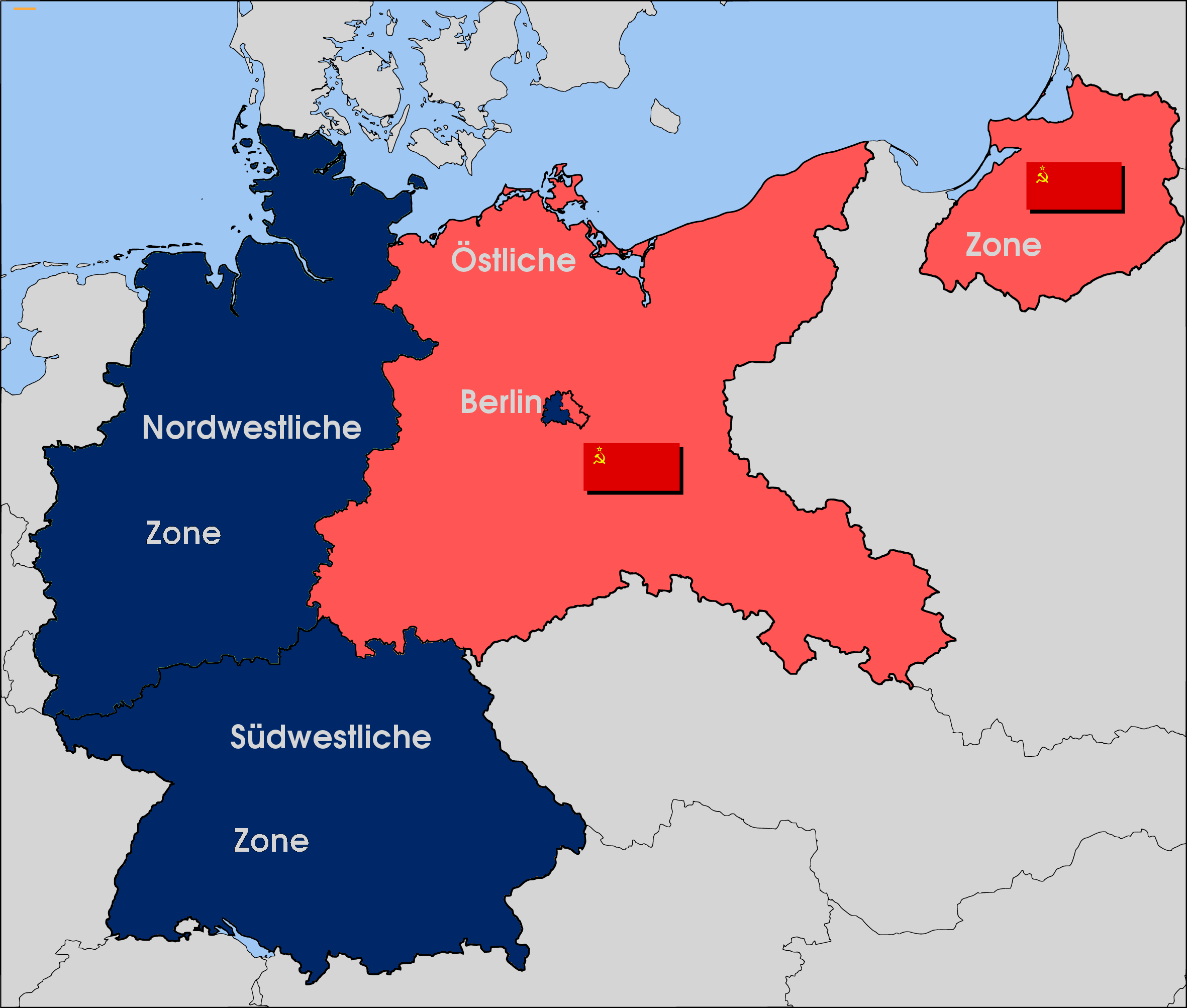
EAC planning of occupation zone borders in Germany, 1944

The first zone protocol was drawn up at the meeting of the European Advisory Commission (EAC) on 12 September 1944 and signed by John Gilbert Winant (USA), William Strang (UK) and Fedor Gusev (USSR) at Lancaster House in London, and described the first notions of the boundary between the zones to be created: Eastern, Northwestern, and Southwestern zones in Germany, and the three parts of the area of Greater Berlin. The basis of the ideas were the borders of Germany from 31 December 1937 and Greater Berlin from 27 April 1920.

The north-western and south-western zones in Germany and Greater Berlin had not yet been assigned as British or American sub-areas. The relevant text passages provided for this were only documented with spaces, whereas the eastern zone and the north-eastern zone of Greater Berlin were already marked directly with "USSR".

In terms of borders, the western borders of Thuringia, Anhalt and the Prussian province of Saxony were referred to. This meant that the areas east of the Werra and west of the Elbe were not – as was often published – "exchanged for West Berlin", but the areas in the west of the Elbe were already intended to be part of the Eastern Zone.

Original text:

Eastern Zone: The territory of Germany (including the province of East Prussia) situated to the East of a line drawn from the point on Lübeck Bay where the frontiers of Schleswig-Holstein and Mecklenburg meet, along the western frontier of Mecklenburg to the frontier of the province of Hanover, thence, along the eastern frontier of Braunschweig; thence along the western frontier of Anhalt; the western frontier of the Prussian province of Saxony and the western frontier of Thuringia to where the latter meets the Bavarian frontier; then eastwards along the northern frontier of Bavaria to the 1937 Czechoslovak frontier, will be occupied by the armed forces of the USSR, with the exception of the Berlin area, for which a special system of occupation is provided below.

The Soviet zone was supposed to encompass the eastern part of Germany, including the explicitly mentioned East Prussia, and no cession of areas to Poland was planned.

The border between the two western zones (and here not yet assigned to any occupying power) was defined as follows:

Northwestern Zone: The territory of Germany situated to the west of the defined above, and bounded on the south by a line drawn from the point where the western frontier of Thuringia meets the frontier of Bavaria; then westwards along the southern frontiers of the Prussian provinces of Hessen-Nassau and Rhine Province to where the latter meets the frontier of France will be occupied by the armed forces of ------.
Southwestern Zone: All the remaining territory of Western Germany situated to the south of the line defined in the description of the North-Western zone will be occupied by the armed forces of ------.

This would have meant that the present-day states of Bavaria and Baden-Württemberg as well as the Palatinate, which previously belonged to Bavaria, and the southern part of the People's State of Hesse would have come to the southwestern (i.e. later American) zone, the Rhine province belonging to Prussia and the province of Hesse-Nassau and the northern part of the People's State of Hesse (Upper Hesse province) to the north-western, i.e. later British. The people's state of Hesse would have been divided by the layout of the occupation zones. This would have cut up the Frankfurt am Main area.

=== The (supplementary) 2nd EAC zone protocol ===
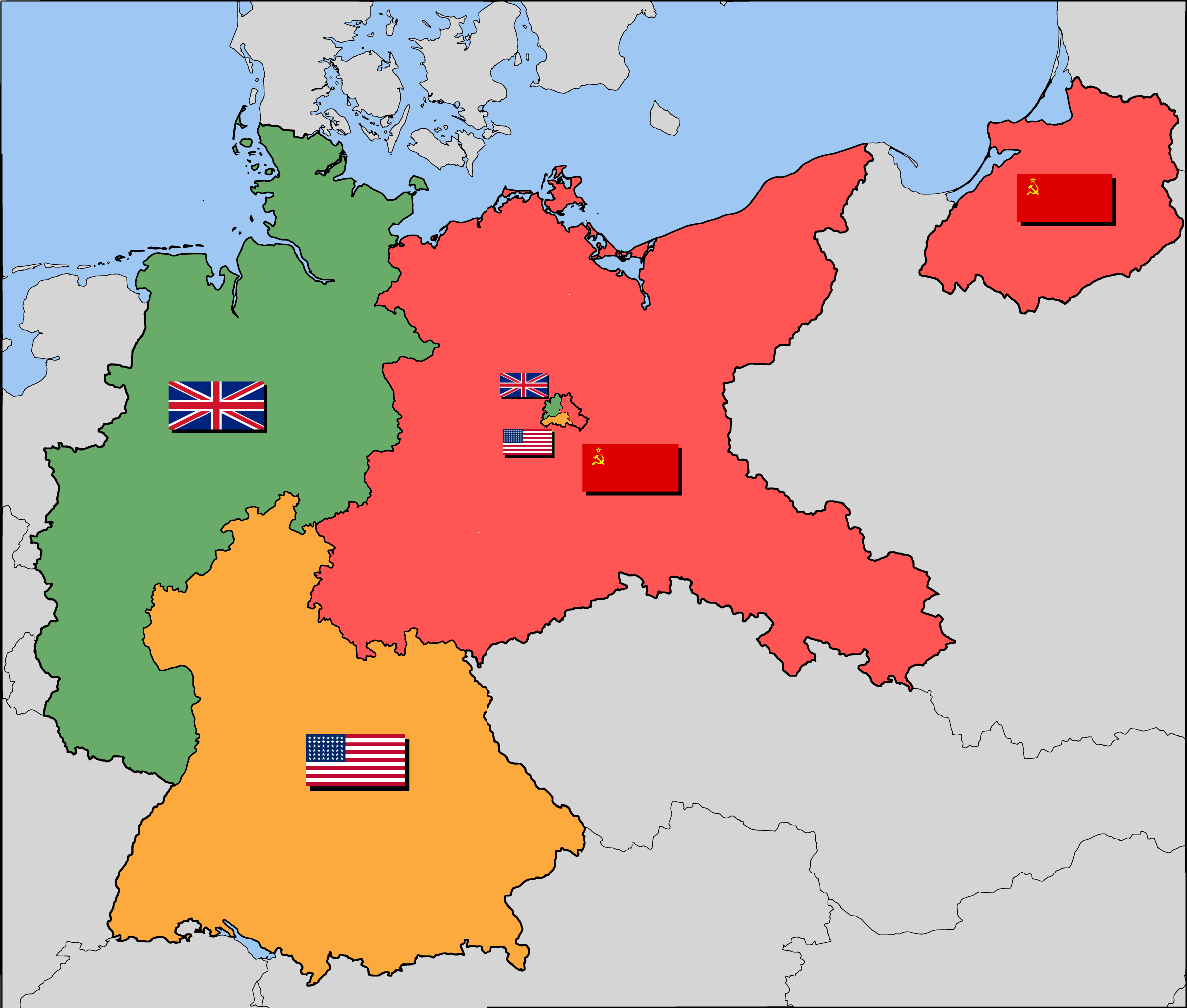
Occupation zone borders in Germany, 1944

The main points of this smaller protocol, also drawn up in London on 14 November 1944, were:

- Allocation of the north-west zone of Germany and the areas of Berlin to the British occupation (replacement of the spaces mentioned)
- Allocation of the south-west zone of Germany and the areas of Berlin to the American occupation (replacement of the spaces mentioned)
- First ideas about the joint use of the ports of Bremen and Bremerhaven
- More detailed description of the intended boundaries between the individual zones

The demarcation between the two western zones had been corrected as follows:

North-Western Zone: The territory of Germany situated to the west of the line defined in the description of the Eastern zone, and bounded on the south by a line drawn from the point where the frontier between the Prussian provinces of Hanover and Hessen-Nassau meets the western frontier of the Prussian province of Saxony; thence along the southern frontier of Hanover; that along the north-western, western and southern frontiers of Hessen-Nassau to the point where the River Rhine leaves the latter; thence along the center of the navigable channel of the River Rhine to the point where it leaves Hessen-Darmstadt; because along the western frontier of Baden to the point where this frontier becomes the Franco-German frontier will be occupied by armed forces of the United Kingdom. [...] South-Western Zone: The territory of Germany situated to the south of a line commencing at the junction of the frontiers of Saxony, Bavaria, and Czechoslovakia and extending westward along the northern frontier of Bavaria to the junction of the frontiers of Hessen-Nassau, Thuringia and Bavaria; thence north, west and south along the eastern, northern, western and southern frontiers of Hessen-Nassau to the point where the River Rhine leaves the southern frontier of Hessen-Nassau; thence southwards along the center of the navigable channel of the River Rhine to the point where it leaves Hessen-Darmstadt; Thence along the western frontier of Baden to the point where this frontier becomes the Franco-German frontier will be occupied by armed forces of the United States of America.

The description is confusing because the flow direction of the Rhine is reversed in it and the points "where the River Rhine leaves the southern frontier of Hesse-Nassau" are actually the ones where the river flows into this province. However, the People's State of Hesse ("Hessen-Darmstadt") is mentioned for the first time in the Second Protocol, while it did not appear in the first Protocol.

In terms of content, the Prussian province of Hesse-Nassau was now assigned to the (now called American) southwest zone, while the Bavarian Palatinate was assigned to the (now officially British) northwest zone. This resolved the above-described conflict of a zone border right through the Frankfurt metropolitan area. By defining the Rhine as a zone boundary in the Hessian people's state, the Hesse state was now divided along the river; the parts of the Rheinhessen province on the left bank of the Rhine were assigned to the British zone, the remaining parts of the state to the American zone. The city of Mainz, situated on both sides of the river, and its half on the right bank of the Rhine, was particularly affected by this the south-west zone, as the districts on the left bank of the Rhine including the city center were assigned to the north-west zone.

=== The (supplementary) 3rd EAC zone protocol ===
The main points of this last of the protocols, written on 26 July 1945, were:

- The geographical allocation and description of a new French zone of occupation, known as the West Zone, the proposed occupation area for troops of the French Republic (from 1949 Troupes d’occupation en Allemagne, TOA) in Germany,
- the regulation of the assignment of the Bavarian district of Lindau on Lake Constance to the western zone, which was previously part of the south-western zone intended for the occupation by US armed forces. This should allow a direct transition for French troops to the French zone in Austria, as well
- a regulation of US-American rights of use of an enclave around Bremen, so that the transfer to the ports of Bremen should be made easier for the occupying forces of the US. The area initially included Bremen, Wesermünde (from 1947 Bremerhaven), the Wesermarsch, Osterholz and the western part of the Cuxhaven district.

The introduction of a proposed, but not yet planned in detail, French occupation zone was entirely at the expense of the areas of the two previous western zones.

The zone protocol was sent to the governments of the four allied powers on 26 July. Details of the boundaries of the French sector in the northwest part of Greater Berlin were not included, only the statement that this sector should be formed from the two sectors of the United Kingdom and the United States. [8th]

The territories of the new or previous zones (excluding the eastern ones) were planned in the third protocol as follows:

North-Western Zone: The territory of Germany situated to west of the line defined in the description of the Eastern (Soviet) Zone, and bounded on the south by a line drawn from the point where the frontier between the Prussian provinces of Hanover and Hessen-Nassau meets the western frontier of the Prussian province of Saxony; thence along the southern frontier of Hanover; that along the south-eastern and south-western frontiers of the Prussian province of Westphalia and along the southern frontiers of the Prussian government districts of Cologne and Aachen to the point where this frontier meets the Belgian-German frontier will be occupied by armed forces of the United Kingdom.

South-Western (United States) Zone: The territory of Germany situated to the south and east of a line commencing at the junction of the frontiers of Saxony, Bavaria and Czechoslovakia and extending westward along the northern frontier of Bavaria to the junction of the frontiers of Hessen-Nassau, Thuringia and Bavaria; then north and west along the eastern and northern frontiers of Hessen-Nassau to the point where the frontier of the district of Dill meets the frontier of the district of Oberwesterwald; then along the western frontier of the district of Dill, the north-western frontier of the district of Oberlahn, the northern and western frontiers of the district of Limburg-an-der-lahn, the north-western frontier of the district of Untertaunus and the northern frontier of the district of Rheingau; then south and east along the western and southern frontiers of Hessen-Nassau to the point where the River Rhine leaves the southern frontier of Hessen-Nassau; then southwards along the center of the navigable channel of the River Rhine to the point where the latter leaves Hessen-Darmstadt; Thence along the western frontier of Baden to the point where the frontier of the district of Karlsruhe meets the frontier of the district of Rastatt; that is southeast along the southern frontier of the district of Karlsruhe; thence north-east and south-east along the eastern frontier of Baden to the point where the frontier of Baden meets the frontier between the districts of Calw and Leonberg; that south and east along the western frontier of the district of Leonberg, the western and southern frontiers of the district of Böblingen, the southern frontier of the district of Nürtingen and the southern frontier of the district of Göppingen to the point where the latter meets the Reichsautobahn between Stuttgart and Ulm; that along the southern boundary of the Reichsautobahn to the point where the latter meets the western frontier of the district of Ulm; that south along the western frontier of the district of Ulm to the point where the latter meets the western frontier of the State of Bavaria; that south along the western frontier of Bavaria to the point where the frontier of the district of Kempten meets the frontier of the district of Lindau; then south-west along the western frontier of the district of Kempten and the western frontier of the district of Sonthofen to the point where the latter meets the Austro -German frontier will be occupied by armed forces of the United States of America. […]

Western (French) Zone: The territory of Germany, situated to the south and west of a line commencing at the junction of the frontiers of Belgium and of the Prussian administrative districts of Trier and Aachen and extending eastward along the northern frontier of the Prussian administrative region of Trier; thence north, east and south along the western, northern and eastern frontier of the Prussian administrative region of Koblenz to the point where the frontier of Koblenz meets the frontier of the district of Oberwesterwald; thence east, south and west along the northern, eastern and southern frontiers of the district of Oberwesterwald and along the eastern frontiers of the districts of Unterwesterwald, Unterlahn and Sankt Goarshausento the point where the frontier of the district of Sankt Goarshausen meets the frontier of the administrative district of Koblenz; that south and east along the eastern frontier of Koblenz; and the northern frontier of Hessen-Darmstadt to the point where the River Rhine leaves the southern frontier of Hessen-Nassau; then southwards along the center of the navigable channel of the River Rhine to the point where the latter leaves Hessen-Darmstadt; that along the western frontier of Baden to the point where the frontier of the district of Karlsruhe meets the frontier of the district of Rastatt; then south-east along the northern frontier of the district of Rastatt; thence north, east and south along the western, northern and eastern frontiers of the district of Calw; then eastwards along the northern frontiers of the districts of Horb, Tübingen, Reutlingen and Münsingen to the point where the northern frontier of the district of Münsingen meets the Reichsautobahn between Stuttgart and Ulm; that southeast along the southern boundary of the Reichsautobahn to the point where the latter meets the eastern frontier of the district of Münsingen; then south-east along the north-eastern frontiers of the districts of Münsingen, Ehingen and Biberach; then southwards along the eastern frontiers of the districts of Biberach, Wangen and Lindau to the point where the eastern frontier of the district of Lindau meets the Austro-German frontier will be occupied by armed forces of the French Republic. […]

The procedure for planning a French occupation zone deviated massively from the previous orientation towards German state and Prussian provincial borders, the only exception to which was the new Rhine border between Mannheim and Wiesbaden. Instead, completely new borders were planned along previous administrative districts and counties. In addition to Hesse, which was already divided in the 2nd Protocol, other regions were affected by the division:

- the Rhineland, whose northern half (administrative districts Düsseldorf, Cologne and Aachen) came to the British zone and the southern administrative districts of Trier and Koblenz to the French zone,
- the historic Duchy of Nassau, whose western districts (on the Middle Rhine, in the Taunus and in the Westerwald) had now been separated and become part of the French zone,
- Baden, of whose territory only the northern half was to belong to the US zone and the southern half to the French zone,
- Württemberg, not mentioned by name in the text, which was also divided into a north and a south half, in parts not even along district boundaries, but along the Stuttgart-Ulm autobahn, this traffic route remaining under US control
- as well as Bavaria, which with the exception of the Palatinate belonged completely to the US zone, in that its district of Lindau changed to the French zone in order to create a land connection between the French zones in Germany and Austria, as already mentioned.

== Aftermath ==
=== 1945 ===
Poland's western border and Konigsberg area

At the Potsdam conference it was determined with regard to the borders of the Soviet zone that the areas east of the Oder and Lusatian Neisse were provisionally subject to Polish administration and were not to be treated (in contrast to the zone protocols) as part of the Soviet zone. The Königsberg area (from 1946 Kaliningrad Oblast), the northern part of East Prussia, was no longer part of this zone.

Airfields Gatow and Staaken

In order to enable the British and Soviet occupying forces to use the two airfields, immediately after the Potsdam Conference, an area swap was carried out on the western city limits of Berlin for the locations or parts of Weststaaken, Weinmeisterhöhe, the Seeburger Zipfel and the eastern part of Groß Glienicke.

=== 1947 ===
Ports of Bremen

After Wesermünde had been spun off from the enclave in the British zone, which was under US administration, in 1947 the US area was reduced to the territory of the Free Hanseatic City of Bremen, which was newly founded in the same year.

== Sources ==
- Clay, Lucius DuBignon (1974). The papers of General Lucius D. Clay: Germany, 1945-1949. Volume 1. Indiana University Press. ISBN 0-253-34288-0.
