= Intercursus Magnus =

1496 commercial treaty between England and Burgundy

- Type: Commercial treaty
- Signed: 24 February 1496
- Signatories: (Kingdom of England) Henry VII, King of England; Philip IV, Duke of Burgundy
- Parties: Kingdom of England; Burgundian Netherlands; Holy Roman Empire; Republic of Venice; Republic of Florence; Dutch Republic; Hanseatic League

The Intercursus Magnus was a major and long-lasting commercial treaty signed in February 1496 by King Henry VII of England and Duke Philip IV of Burgundy. Other signatories included the commercial powers of Venice, Florence, the Netherlands, and the Hanseatic League.

== Background ==
The Wars of the Roses, a series of dynastic civil wars between two branches of the House of Plantagenet, had been fought in several sporadic episodes, mainly between 1455 and 1485. In 1485, the Lancastrian claimant Henry Tudor defeated the Yorkist king Richard III on Bosworth Field and married Elizabeth of York, daughter of Edward IV and sister to the Princes in the Tower, to unite the houses. In 1490, a young Fleming, Perkin Warbeck, appeared and claimed to be Richard, the younger of the Yorkist "Princesses in the Tower" and, thus, a pretender to the English crown. Warbeck had already forced Henry's hand in foreign policy during the French–Breton War by forcing Henry to sign the Treaty of Étaples to get France to banish him, despite Henry's promise to help Brittany in the war as demanded by the Treaty of Redon. Warbeck was, therefore, the most significant threat during Henry's reign and the last remnants of the Wars of the Roses. In 1493, Warbeck won the support of Edward IV's sister Margaret, dowager duchess of Burgundy, who was a strong and persistent enemy of Henry VII due to her being sister to Richard III of England. She allowed him to remain at her court, gave him 2,000 mercenaries, and support for an eventual invasion of England.

After the Black Death in the late 14th century, England began to dominate the European cloth market, with trade reaching a first peak in 1447 when exports reached 60,000 cloths. The Low Countries, then Burgundian, were one of England's major export markets, particularly Antwerp. The cloth trade was important to Burgundy, as well as being a major component of the English economy (accounting for 80% of English exports in 1485).

== The Treaty ==
It was a major and brave act of domestic and foreign policy, thus, for Henry VII to issue a trade embargo – reciprocated by Duke Philip IV of Burgundy – as a result of Margaret's meddling. Henry forced the Merchant Adventurers, the company which enjoyed the monopoly of the Flemish wool trade and with whom he had a good relationship, to relocate from Antwerp to the Pale of Calais and ejected Flemish merchants from England. Though this would have been suicidal when Henry came to the throne in 1485 due to the reliance of Antwerp as a trade hub, a series of successful trade treaties during 1486 – including with France and Brittany that removed all Anglo-French trade restrictions – as well as the Treaty of Medina del Campo (1489) diversified English trade routes and provided Henry the breathing room required to hold the English trade through Antwerp hostage in order to negotiate the removal of Burgundian support for Warbeck.

This diversification of English trade routes allowed Henry to maintain the embargo for 3 years, until 1496. Margaret's influence faded after the threat of the removal of her dower lands of County of Artois and Palatine Burgundy and it became clear that the embargo was hurting both the English and the Flemish economies, so the Intercursus Magnus was signed, with Margaret's acceptance of the Tudor succession and the banishment of Warbeck being conditions of the treaty. Philip was also keen to secure English help against France, and so the treaty had very favourable conditions for English merchants. The treaty granted reciprocal trade privileges to English and Flemings and established fixed duties. These certainties greatly aided English export of wool, and thus both Henry VII's treasury and Flemish and Brabantine industry, whilst also providing freedoms to the Hollandic and Zeelandic fisheries. Further treaty promises of impartial justice for English merchants in Burgundian courts were poorly effected. The importance of the treaty for England, who still relied heavily on the wool trade through Antwerp, cannot be overstated and served as another major success for Henry in both his economic and foreign policy aims.

The treaty remained in place until 1506, when Duke Philip and his wife, Joanna of Castile, were shipwrecked off the coast of England on the way to Castile. Henry VII essentially held the two captive until Philip agreed to the Malus Intercursus, which provided even more favourable terms to English merchants, and demanded the Burgundians to hand over Edmund de la Pole, 3rd Duke of Suffolk, Henry's greatest enemy and pretender beside Warbeck. However, upon Philip's death in September 1506, having been released from England in February or March after a forced stay of 6 weeks, his sister, Margaret of Austria, refused to ratify the terms of the treaty (that would have seen her betrothed to the recently widowed Henry VII), and later signed a third treaty in 1507 that saw a near complete return to the terms of the Intercursus Magnus.

Perkin Warbeck, who fled before the treaty was signed (as he had done in France before the Treaty of Etaples) appeared in Scotland in September 1496. He persuaded James IV of Scotland to invade England but, a year later, Warbeck landed in Cornwall with a few thousand troops, fomenting the Second Cornish Uprising of 1497. He was captured at Beaulieu Abbey in Hampshire and hanged at the Tyburn on 23 November 1499.

== Sources ==
- Raymond Adrien de Roover (1966), The rise and decline of the Medici Bank: 1397–1494, New York City; Toronto: W. W. Norton & Company; George J. McLeod Limited (respectively), LCCN 63-11417, OCLC 743184 — the product of three years of research in the Florentine archives to improve the author's previous work, it was previously released in 1963 by Harvard University Press.
