= Medina del Campo =

- Municipality
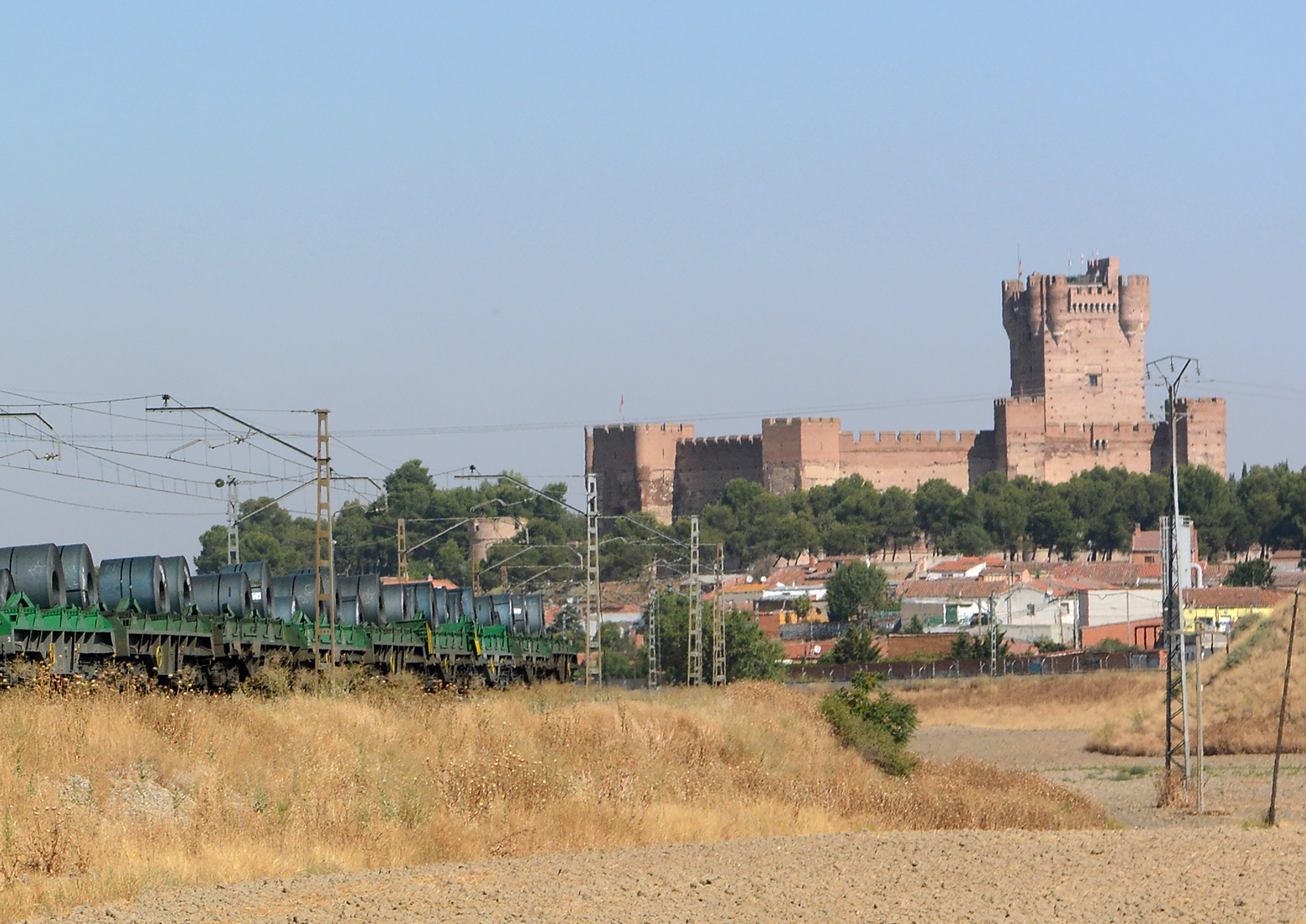
- View of the city

- Flag Coat of arms
- Interactive map of Medina del Campo
- Coordinates: 41°18′N 4°55′W
- Country: Spain
- Autonomous community: Castile and León
- Province: Valladolid

Government
  - Mayor: Guzmán Gómez Alonso (PP)

Area
  - Total: 153.27 km^{2} (59.18 sq mi)
- Elevation: 720 m (2,360 ft)

Population (2025-01-01)
  - Total: 20,215
  - Density: 131.89/km^{2} (341.60/sq mi)
- Demonym: Medinenses
- Time zone: UTC+1 (CET)
  - Summer (DST): UTC+2 (CEST)
- Postal code: 47400
- Website: Official website

Medina del Campo is a town and municipality of Spain located in the autonomous community of Castile and León. Part of the Province of Valladolid, it is the centre of a farming area.

It lies on the banks of the Zapardiel river, in the central part of the Douro basin. Initially a Berber settlement, it was repopulated after 1085. By the 12th century the walled town had become a major population centre of the Kingdom of Castile, drawing large-scale trading operations. It was later granted right to hold its well-known free fairs, which attracted a notable presence of international dealers.

It is located on the A-6 road route.

== History ==
Medina del Campo grew in importance thanks to its fairs held during the 15th and 16th centuries. This helped with banking and the businesses of wool, textiles, books and an enormous variety of other goods. As the population increased, the town expanded outward toward the plain of Zapardiel brook. Since then, the Padilla Street became the business centre of Medina.

In 1489 a great trade agreement, that would last for 96 years, united the kingdoms of Spain and England with the reduction of trade tariffs, the recognition of France as a common enemy, and the marriage of Catherine of Aragon to King Henry VII's son, Prince Arthur (and later to King Henry VIII)—this was known as the Treaty of Medina del Campo (1489).

At the time of the Revolt of the Comuneros, Medina del Campo was a major town housing the royal artillery. A Royalist attempt to take possession of the artillery pieces led to heavy resistance culminating in the burning of the city.

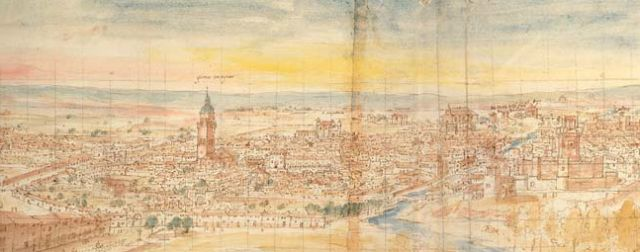
Medina del Campo as drawn by Anton van den Wyngaerde circa 1562.

During the 16th century Medina del Campo thrived, with its fair becoming the most important among the triangle of great Castilian fairs (Medina del Campo, Villalón and Medina de Rioseco). The fair of Medina del Campo featured a notable presence of international dealers, chiefly Castilian, Portuguese, Italian (Genovese, Milanese and Florentines) and Flemish, as well as also some French, English and German merchants.

A prosperous Jewish community once existed in Medina del Campo, but became nonexistent after the expulsion of the Jews in 1492. Isaac Uzziel is recorded as the community's last rabbi and is believed to have resettled in Thessaloniki (then part of the Ottoman Empire) following the expulsion.

Between the 17th century and the 19th century decline set in. The city experienced a deep transformation in its social fabric during the early 17th century, through a process of ruralization that increased the proportion of the populace employed at the primary sector.

The town took off again at the end of the 19th century. The first train of the Compañía de los Caminos de Hierro del Norte de España arrived in Medina del Campo on 3 September 1860. the opening of the military district (the quarter of Marques de la Ensenada), and the opening of the hydrothermal establishment of Las Salinas. Also adding to the growth were the strong commercial sector, such as the furniture trade or the opening of shops on Sundays (which is not customary in Spain), and finally proximity of quality wines with the Denominación de Origen of Rueda.

== Main sights ==
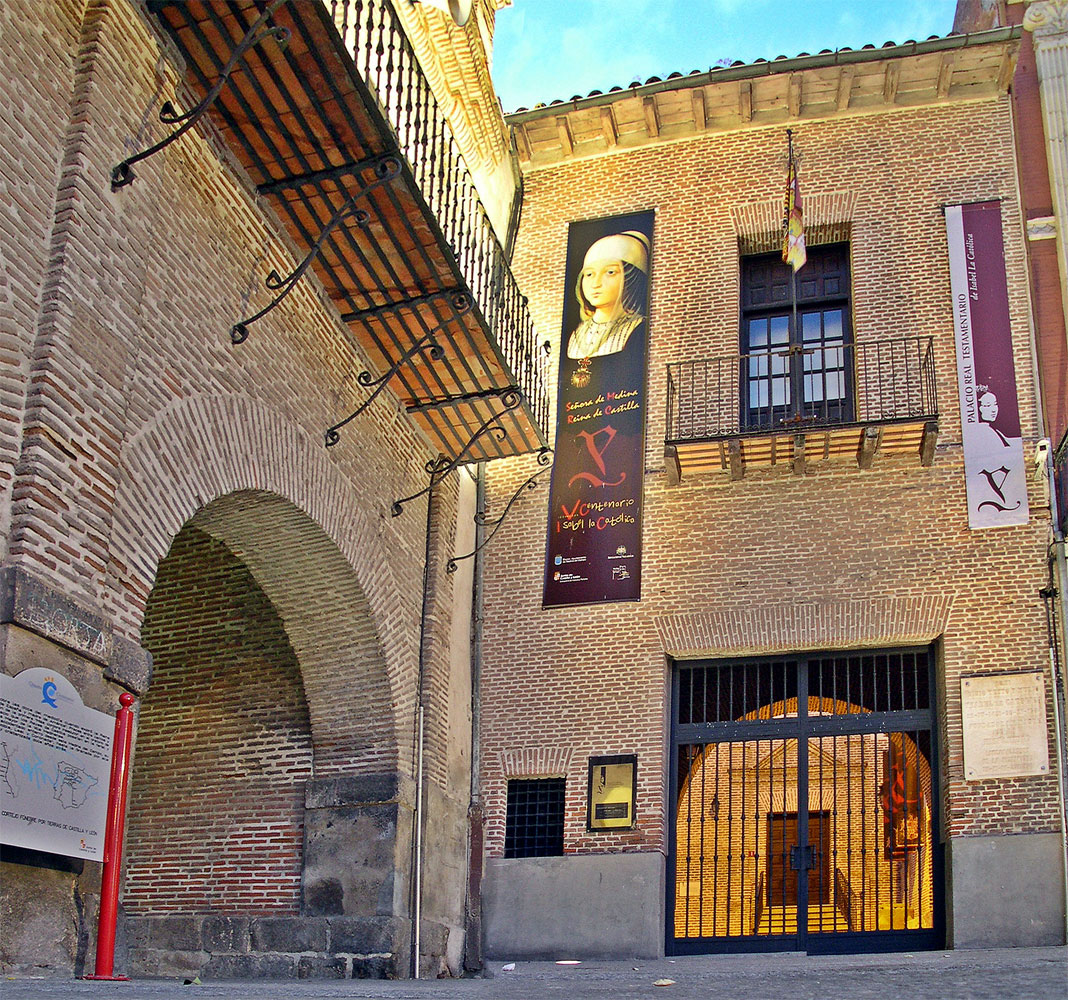
Royal Palace

Almost all the buildings of artistic interest date from the 16th century; examples are the country house known as Casa Blanca, the Palacio de Dueñas (Don Rodrigo de Dueñas Manor House) and the Hospital of Simón Ruiz. These buildings were promoted by rich merchant bankers who prospered thanks to the General Fair of the Spanish Kingdom held in Medina del Campo during the 15th and 16th centuries. The Museum of the Fairs was created to exhibit items connected to this open market, and it is a popular visitor attraction.

The word "Medina" means "city" in Arabic (المدينة). Medina del Campo was founded on the hill called La Mota in the 11th century, in the same place where the Castle is, and remains of a wall still survive. At the moment, the Mota hill is a suburban area, however in the Middle Ages it was the town centre.

In addition, this hill has archaeological remains such as a stronghold, a medieval village and a Celtic walled settlement dated from the 4th century BC (Iron Age).

=== Castle of La Mota ===
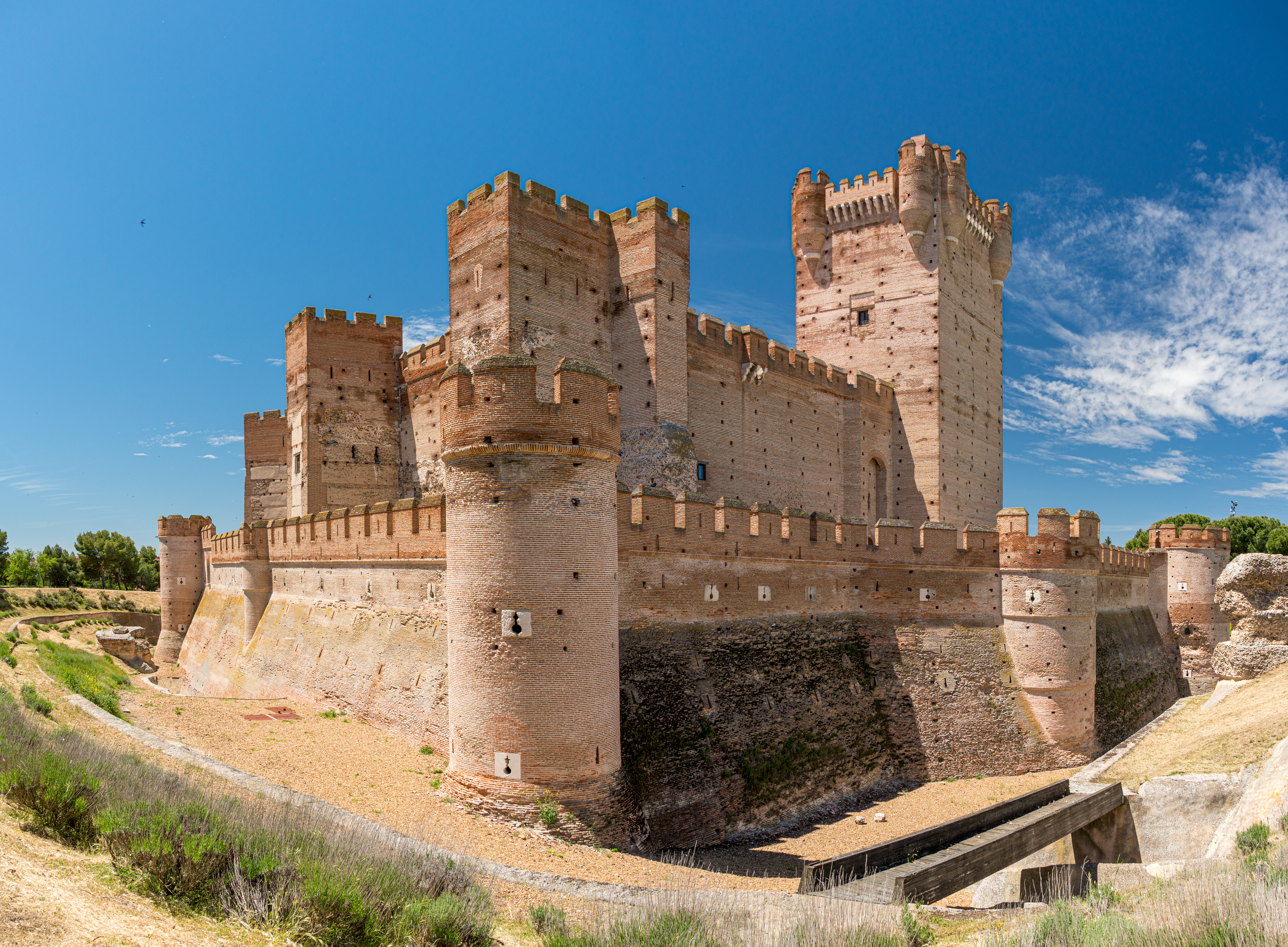
View of Castle of La Mota

The word Mota refers to an artificial hill built to defend the castle better (See motte-and-bailey castle). The Mota fortress had a military function and it also was a royal dungeon, among its most notorious prisoners being Cesare Borgia. The castle was built between the 12th century and 15th century. It has a moat with its own drawbridge (today fixed), an outer curtain wall (for artillery), an inner curtain wall (with arrow slits for archers and guards) surrounding a large courtyard, and a great square tower (which is the Keep).

The castle was abandoned and collapsed, but was restored after the Spanish Civil War (1936–1939). It was the first monumental building in Medina designated as a Heritage Site (Bien de interés cultural).

=== Walls ===
Medina was a walled village, and its stronghold was a very important building around the town to protect the people from attacks. The walls date from the 11th century, and they were enlarged three times, as the population was growing. At present, there are only remains.

=== St. Michael's Church ===
This church was built beside the wall gate of the old town, opposite the original city hall, which no longer exists. Its entrance hall was probably the meeting point of the council.

The oldest part of the church was built in the Mudéjar–Gothic style; but has been renovated several times. The greater chapel has large dimensions, with a Gothic ribbed vault roof and an altarpiece dated to the 16th century.

The choir is in the west facade, and features a baroque organ. (dated to the 18th century)

=== Las Reales Carnicerías ===
This is an ancient market-hall, in Spanish called Mercado de Abastos, on the left bank of the Zapardiel brook. It was built under the Catholic Monarchs in 1500 in a Renaissance style. Later, during the reign of Philip II, it was used for selling meat to the population. It is the only historic building of this type in the world still used for its original purpose.

=== La Calle Padilla (Padilla Street) ===
This lane connects the Main Square with St. Michael's Bridge (also called Puente de las Cadenas). This street was named in honour of Juan de Padilla, a communard leader of the Castilians in the 16th century (see Castilian War of the Communities); but earlier was named "Rúa Nueva" (New Road). Padilla Street was the downtown area where numerous banks and jewellery shops settled, and actually some of them still mains.

Whereas the financiers settled in Padilla Street, the other merchants were distributed in the Main Square according to Ordenanzas de Feriantes (Lodging Ordinances).

=== La Casa del Peso (The House of Pounds) ===
This building stands in the Main Square and is built over five elegant arcades with long balcony. It was established in the 17th century in order to keep the "Peso Real" (Royal Weight) and to guarantee the official weights and measures.

=== Royal Palace ===
This mansion was the residence of the royal family in the time of Fairs. In this palace many historical incidents happened during the 14th and 15th Centuries. The most important episode was the will and death of Isabel la Católica (Queen of Castile), 26 November 1504 (for this reason it is also called Palacio Testamentario, Testamentary Palace).

The Palace was started in the 14th century and was enlarged both by Don Fernando de Antequera (Lord of Medina del Campo and, afterwards, King of Aragon), as well as by the Reyes Católicos. It was restored three times, in 1601, 1603 and 1673. It was at one time much larger than the present-day building.

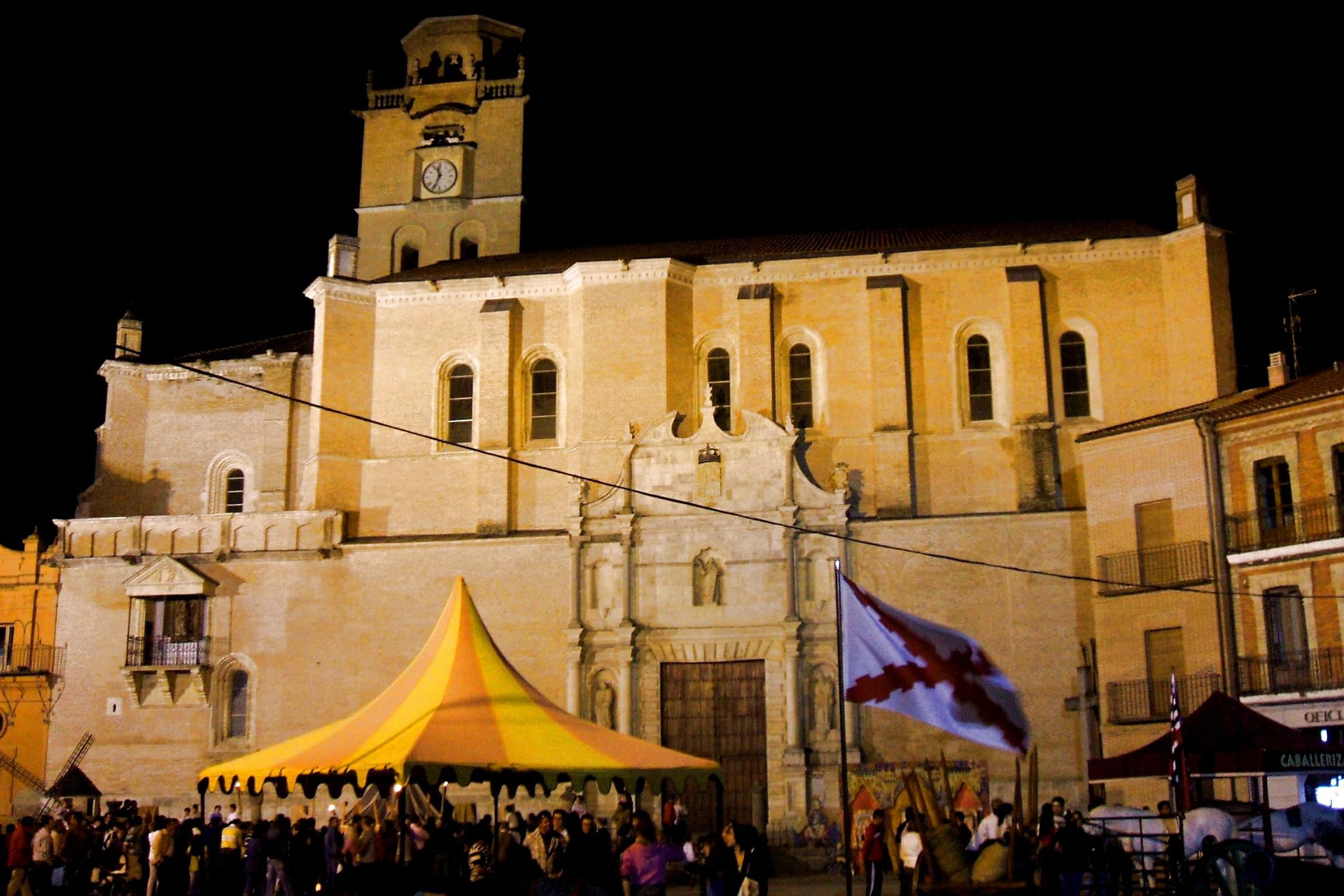
Facade of the Collegiate Church of San Antolín in Medina del Campo

=== Collegiate Church of San Antolín ===
This church, dedicated to St. Antoninus of Pamiers (San Antolín), is in Gothic, Renaissance and Baroque styles. It was constructed between the 16th century and the 18th century. The nave and the aisles are of Late Gothic style, with numerous chapels, such as the Chapel of the Virgen del Pópolo, with a balcony, which was used to celebrate the mass for all the market traders lodged in the Main Square. The Collegiate Church of Medina was restored in 2004.

== Economy ==
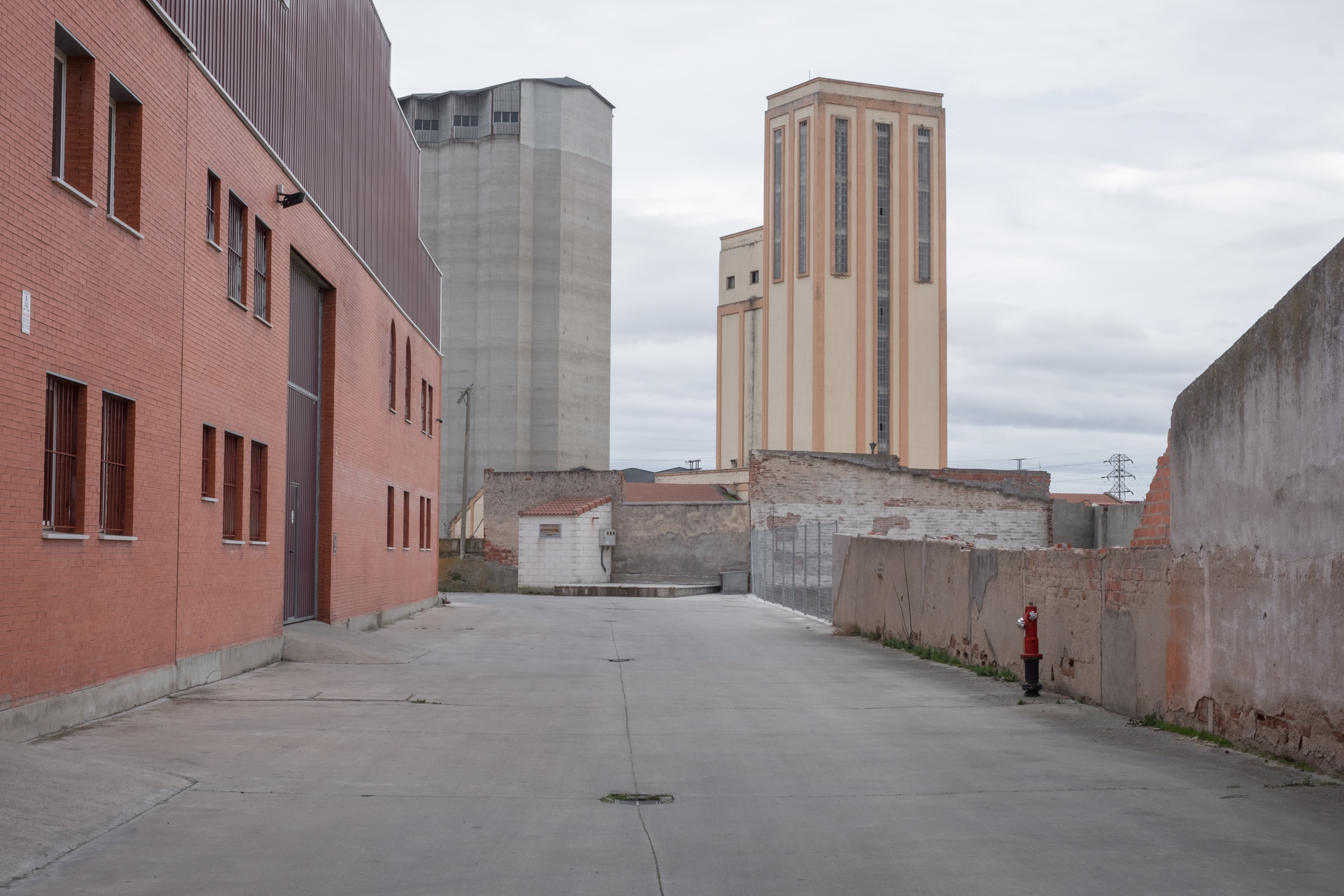
Silos in Medina del Campo

The main activities of the industrial sector are furniture (example Castill Confort), metal (for instance, MADE S.A., or Ferroaleaciones Españolas SA) the food industry (like Productos Casado and others). As for the service sector, it has a special place in the history of Medina, due to the tradition of Fairs. Today, many services are offered in the town such as administrative (private and public ones), or trade activities that are gathered in the historical centre of the town.

Most of the land is dry, so, the most important crops are cereals. However, viticulture is important too in the north of the municipality.

== Transport ==
The town is at one end of a test track for high speed trains and for the Talgo RD Gauge Changer system the other end being at Olmedo, Valladolid.

== Events ==
The Holy Week has been officially declared a Tourist Attraction, because of the artistic value of his religious images and the documented antiquity of its processions. The Film Festival Week has been, for 19 years, an appointment for the producers of Short-Films of the whole world. There is also a Sports Week in spring, one rooted Half-Marathon and a tennis tournament. It is famous for the Greyhound Races National Championship, which consists of hare-coursing.

The local patron feast San Antolín (Saint Antoninus of Pamiers) is held on 2 September. The celebrations revolve around the religious ceremonies and, above all, around the bullfighting.

The encierros (Running of the Bulls) are very typical of Medina (they let the fighting bulls loose throughout the fields and along the streets of the city, leading them up to the bullring). Also emblematic are the Dodges, in Spanish so-called cortes, in which people go towards the bull and, just when the beast attacks, try to avoid them.

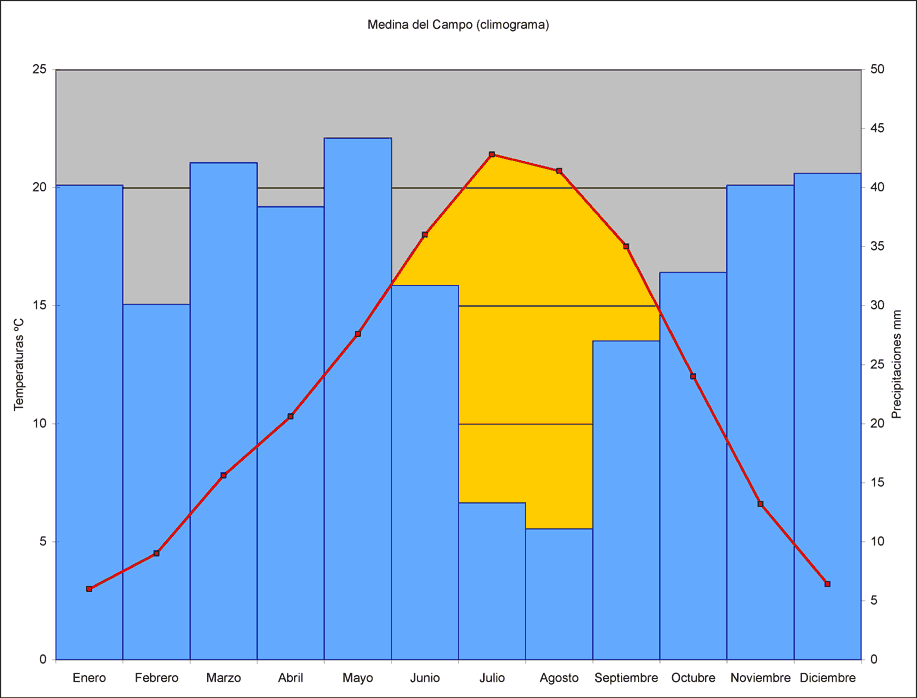
→Annual temperature average: 11.6°C →Annual range of temperatures: 18.4°C →Annual precipitations: 392 mm/m^{2} →Dry months: June, July, August and September →Months with average temperatures under 0°C: none →Climate: Mediterranean Continentalized.

== Twin towns ==
- Montmorillon, France, since 1994
- Zug, Western Sahara, since 2008.

== See also ==
- Medina del Campo railway station
- Medina del Campo AV railway station
