= Malus Intercursus =

1506 commercial treaty between England and Burgundy

- Type: Commercial treaty
- Signed: 30 April 1506
- Location: Weymouth, England
- Effective: Never ratified; repudiated by Margaret of Austria
- Signatories: (Kingdom of England) Henry VII of England; Philip IV of Burgundy

The Malus Intercursus was a commercial treaty signed in April 1506 by King Henry VII of England and Duke Philip IV of Burgundy. The treaty was signed while Philip was stranded in England, after surviving a shipwreck.

The treaty removed all duties from English textile exports. Another term was the arranged marriage of the widowed Henry VII to the also widowed Margaret of Austria, Philip's sister. This marriage never took place, as Margaret objected to the treaty and its terms. Another term of the treaty forced Philip to surrender custody of Edmund de la Pole, 3rd Duke of Suffolk to Henry VII. At the time, the exiled Suffolk was the leading heir of the House of York. In return, Henry VII recognised Philip and his wife Joanna of Castile as the legitimate rulers of the Kingdom of Castille, and allowed them to safely leave England.

== Background and detail ==
Continuing frictions with the Company of Merchant Adventurers of London, combined with Henry's desire to secure Edmund de la Pole, 3rd Duke of Suffolk, the leading Yorkist heir, sheltering in Burgundy, led Henry to attempt further negotiations, even after the ratification of the Intercursus Magnus in 1496. A shipwreck in 1506 left Philip stranded in England en route to claiming the Castilian inheritance of his wife, Joanna the Mad. This enabled Henry to negotiate the Intercursus Malus ("evil treaty", so named from the Dutch perspective for being far too favorable to English interests), intended to replace the Intercursus Magnus.

This replacement removed all duties from English textile exports without reciprocity and with little compensation for the Burgundians. 49-year-old Henry, widowed three years previously, also arranged to be married to Philip's sister, the twice-widowed 26-year-old Margaret. Finally Philip of Burgundy was forced to hand over Edmund de la Pole. Henry also recognised Philip and Joanna as the rulers of Castille (seeing as Queen Isabella I of Castile had died in 1504). After handing over de la Pole, Philip and Joanna were allowed to leave England after a forced stay of six weeks.

Margaret's objection—both to the marriage and the treaty more generally—meant that, on Philip's death that September and Margaret's appointment as Governor of the Habsburg Netherlands (and de facto ruler), the treaty was not ratified being replaced instead by a third treaty in 1507, repeating the terms of the first.
