= Jean du Quélennec =

Various people

Jean du Quélennec is the name of several members of the prestigious Quélennec family, originally from Saint-Gilles-Vieux-Marché in the Côtes-d'Armor department of Brittany, France.

== Jean I du Quélennec ==
Via his marriage in 1371 to Typhaine du Faou, viscountess of Faou, Jean ensured the Quélennec family would inherit the viscountcy.

== Jean II du Quélennec ==
The son of Jean I du Quélennec, he served as Admiral of Brittany from 1433 to 1472.

== Jean III du Quélennec ==
The son of Jean II du Quélennec, he also served as admiral of Brittany from 1484 to 1487.

== Jean or Guyon du Quélennec ==
The elder son of Jean III du Quélennec, (died 1478), seigneur du Quélennec, vicomte of Faou, he succeeded to the office of Admiral of Brittany. Guyon was chamberlain to Francis II of Brittany and of Brest. He married in 1440 to Jeanne de Rostrenen (born circa 1425), heiress to La Roche-Helgomarc'h in Saint-Thois.

In 1463, Guyon was the commander of a company when Francis II marched on Paris at the head of 10,000 Bretons.

During Henry Tudor, Earl of Richmond's exile in Brittany, under Francis' protection, Guyon became an ally to Henry. In November 1476, Francis fell ill and his advisers were willing to use Henry to negotiate with England's king Edward IV, as Henry was a claimant to England's throne. As such, Henry was turned over to English representatives to be escorted to Saint-Malo. There he faked stomach cramps to stave off leaving Brittany until the English missed the tides. Guyon soon arrived to disclose Francis had recovered, and in the ensuing confusion, Henry managed to flee and claim sanctuary at a monastery until the envoys were forced to leave without Henry in their custody.

== Jean IV du Quélennec ==
The younger son of Jean III du Quélennec, Jean IV du Quélennec (died 1522), the seigneur of Quélennec, died without issue.
