= Cultural depictions of Henry VII of England =

Henry VII of England has been depicted a number of times in popular culture.

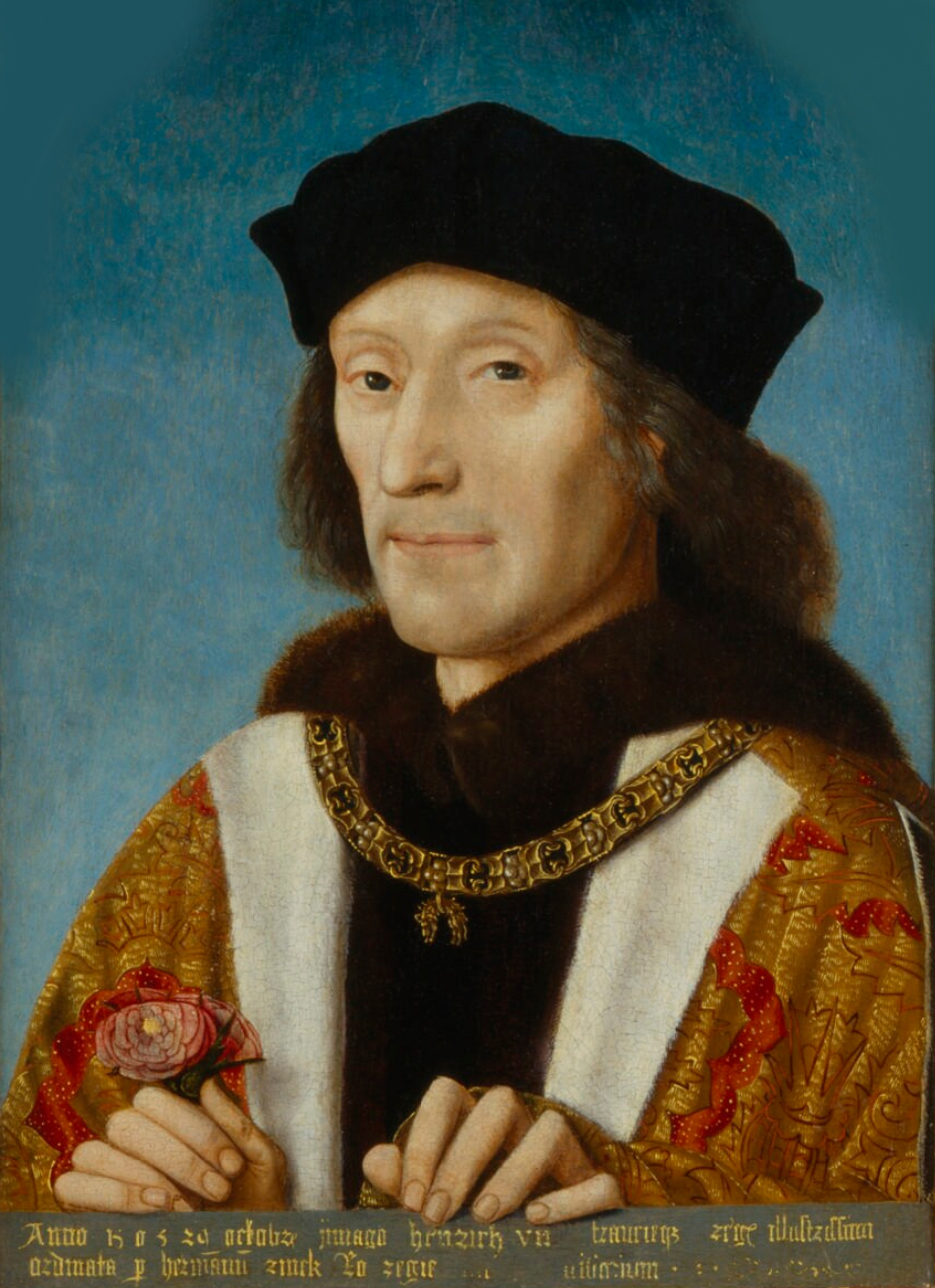
Portrait of King Henry VII holding a Tudor Rose, wearing collar of the Order of the Golden Fleece, dated 1505, by unknown artist, National Portrait Gallery, London (NPG 416)

== Literature ==
As a youthful Earl of Richmond, Henry is a character in the play Henry VI, Part 3 by William Shakespeare. He is also a character in Shakespeare's play Richard III.

The Founding, Volume 1 of The Morland Dynasty, a series of historical novels by author Cynthia Harrod-Eagles, is set against the background of the Wars of the Roses. Towards the end of the novel a fictional account is given of Henry winning his crown through the Battle of Bosworth, and of the events leading up to this battle.

He is the hero of the historical novel An Unknown Welshman (1972) by Jean Stubbs.

In the celebrated fantasy novel The Dragon Waiting by John M. Ford, Henry is killed at the Battle of Bosworth, thus preventing the House of Tudor from ruling England.

Henry appears in four novels by Philippa Gregory: The Red Queen (2010), which centers on the life of his mother Margaret Beaufort and her ambition to get him on the throne; The White Princess (2013), which centers on his wife, Elizabeth of York; The White Queen (2009), which centers on the life of his mother-in-law, Elizabeth Woodville; and a brief appearance in The Constant Princess (2005).

== Film ==
Henry has been portrayed by the following actors on film, mostly in versions of the Shakespeare play:

- Eric Maxon in the silent short Richard III (1911), dramatising a part of Shakespeare's play
- James Keane in the silent Shakespeare adaptation Richard III (1912), one of the earliest American feature films
- Ralph Forbes in Tower of London (1939), a horror film loosely dramatising Richard III's rise to power
- Stanley Baker in the Shakespeare adaptation Richard III (1955), with Laurence Olivier as Richard
- Powys Thomas in the Canadian short film John Cabot: A Man of the Renaissance (1964)
- Dominic West in Richard III (1995), with Ian McKellen as Richard
- Aidan Quinn in Looking for Richard (1996), with Al Pacino as Richard
- Andrew Tiernan in Richard III (2005), a modernised version set on a Brighton housing estate
- Marco Sanchez in Richard III (2007), a modern-day version
- Luke Treadaway in The Hollow Crown with Benedict Cumberbatch as Richard

== Television ==
Henry has been portrayed on television by:

- Hennie Scott and Jerome Willis in the BBC series An Age of Kings (1960), which contained all the history plays from Richard II to Richard III
- Heinz Blau in the West German TV version of Shakespeare's play König Richard III (1964)
- James Maxwell in the BBC drama Tower of London: The Innocent (1969) and the BBC series The Shadow of the Tower (1972), which dramatised Henry's reign
- John Woodnutt in the BBC series The Six Wives of Henry VIII (1970), with Keith Michell as Henry VIII
- András Kozák in III. Richárd (1973), a Hungarian TV version of the Shakespeare play
- Peter Benson in the first episode of the BBC comedy series The Black Adder (1983) It is claimed here he lost the Battle of Bosworth, but after the Yorkists were wiped out he rewrote history.
- Tim Fuke in the BBC Shakespeare version of Henry VI, Part 3 (1983)
- Brian Deacon in the BBC Shakespeare version of The Tragedy of Richard the Third (1983)
- Patrick Brennan (voice) in the BBC series Shakespeare: The Animated Tales (1994)
- Joss Ackland in the Granada Television serial Henry VIII (2003), with Ray Winstone as Henry VIII
- Adam Woodroffe in an episode of the British educational TV series Historyonics entitled "Richard III" (2004)
- Paul Hilton in the British drama Princes in the Tower (2005), about Perkin Warbeck
- Mathew Baynton and Adam Riches in the BBC educational show Horrible Histories
- Michael Marcus in the BBC drama series, The White Queen (2013), an adaptation of the Philippa Gregory novels
- Jacob Collins-Levy in Starz drama series, The White Princess (2017), an adaptation of the Philippa Gregory novels

Video Game

- Yugi Mutou as Henry Tudor, later Henry VII of England, Yu-Gi-Oh! The Duelists of the Roses (2001)
