= Jean Stubbs =

British writer (1926–2012)

Jean Stubbs (23 October 1926 – 19 October 2012) was a British writer.

She was born Jean Yvonne Higham in Denton, Lancashire the daughter of Joseph Higham, a lecturer at Manchester University and Millies Darby, and was educated at Manchester High School for Girls, the Manchester School of Art and Loreburn Secretarial College in Manchester. Stubbs worked as a copywriter for Henry Melland from 1964 to 1966 and was a reviewer for Books and Bookmen from 1965 to 1976. She died in the Helston district of Cornwall in 2012.

She received the Tom Gallon Trust Award for short story in 1964. Her 1973 novel Dear Laura was nominated for an Edgar Award.

She was married twice: first to Peter Stubbs in 1948 and then to Roy Oliver in 1980.

== Selected works ==
- The Rose Grower (Macmillan 1962) (St Martin's Press 1963)
- The Travellers (Macmillan 1963) (St Martin's Press 1963)
- Hanrahan's Colony (Macmillan 1964)
- The Straw Crown (Macmillan 1966)
- John Lintott series, historical mysteries
  - My Grand Enemy (Macmillan 1967) (Stein & Day 1967)
  - The Case of Kitty Ogilvie (Macmillan 1970) (Walker 1971)
  - Dear Laura (Macmillan 1973) (Stein & Day 1973)
  - The Painted Face (Macmillan 1974) (Stein & Day 1974)
  - The Golden Crucible (Macmillan 1976)(Stein & Day 1976)
- Unlikely Ghosts (contribution) (Taplinger 1969)
- The Passing Star (Macmillan 1970) Eleanora Duse (Stein & Day 1970)
- Winter's Crimes 3 (contribution) (Macmillan 1971)
- An Unknown Welshman (Stein & Day 1972)
- The Eleventh Ghost Book (contribution) (Barrie & Jenkins 1975)
- Howarth family quartet, historical fiction 'Brief Chronicles' I-IV
  - By Our Beginnings (St Martin's Press 1979), known as Kit's Hill (Macmillan 1978) in the UK
  - An Imperfect Joy (St Martin's Press 1981), known as The Ironmaster (Macmillan 1981) in the UK
  - The Vivian Inheritance (Macmillan 1982) (St Martin's Press 1982)
  - The Northern Correspondent (Macmillan 1984) (St Martin's Press 1984)
- 100 Years Around the Lizard (Bossiney Books 1985)
- Great Houses of Cornwall (Bossiney Books 1987)
- A Lasting Spring (Macmillan 1987) (St Martin's Press 1987)
- Like We Used To be (Macmillan 1989) (St Martin's Press 1989)
- Love Stories (contribution 'Snow Storm') (St Martin's Press 1990)
- Summer Secrets (Macmillan 1990) Light in Summer (St Martin's Press 1991)
- Kelly Park (Macmillan 1992) (St Martin's Press 1992)
- Charades (Macmillan 1994) Family Games (St Martin's Press 1994)
- The Witching Time (Gollancz 1998) (St Martin's Press 1998)
