= Henry VII of England =

King of England from 1485 to 1509

Henry VII
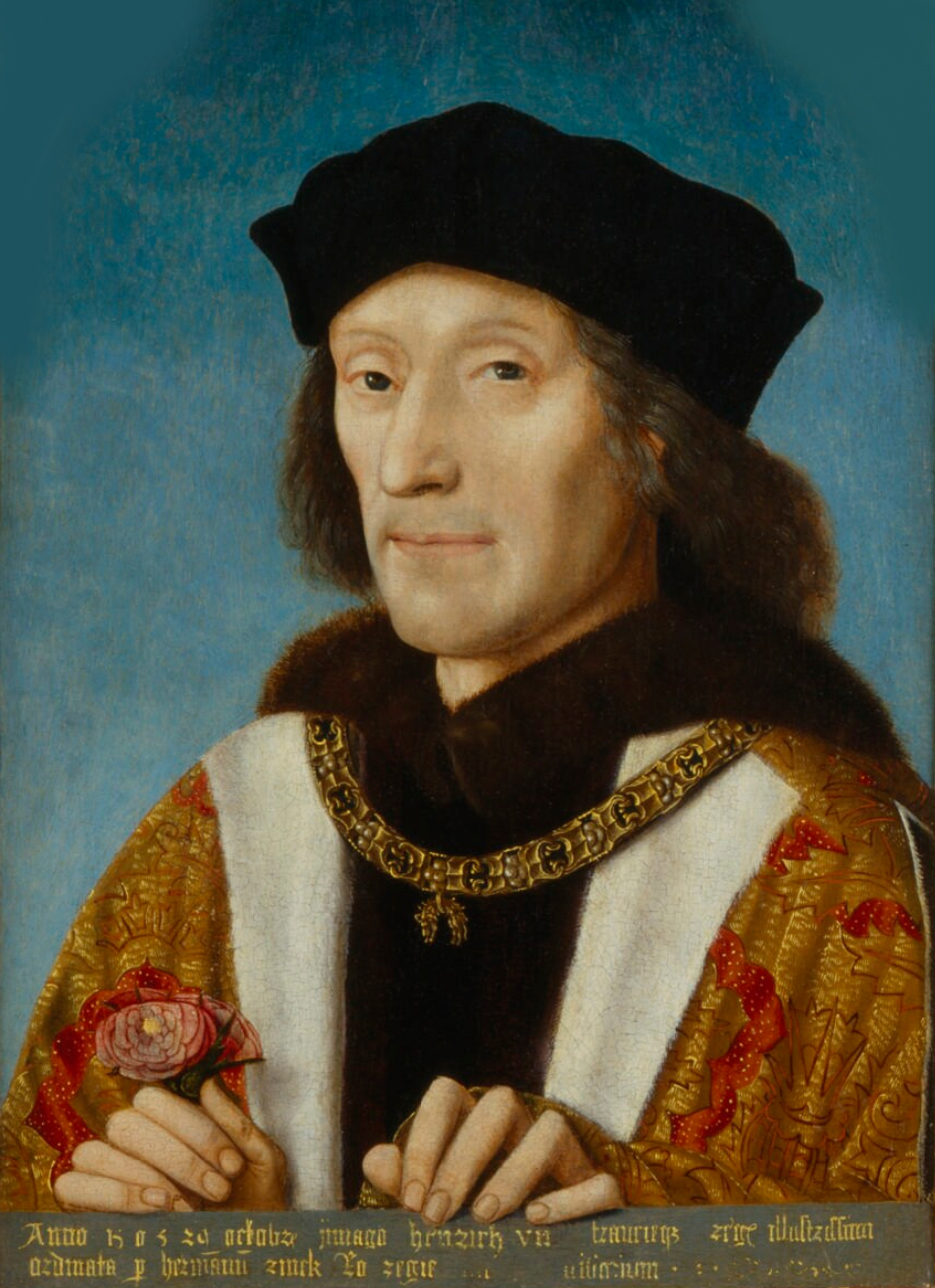
- Henry holding a rose and wearing the collar of the Order of the Golden Fleece, c. 1505

King of England
- Reign: 22 August 1485 – 21 April 1509
- Coronation: 30 October 1485
- Predecessor: Richard III
- Successor: Henry VIII
- Born: Henry Tudor, 2nd Earl of Richmond; 28 January 1457; Pembroke Castle, Pembrokeshire, Wales
- Died: 21 April 1509 (aged 52); Richmond Palace, Surrey, England
- Burial: 11 May 1509; Westminster Abbey, London, England
- Spouse: Elizabeth of York (m. 1486; died 1503)
- Issue more...: Arthur, Prince of Wales; Margaret, Queen of Scots; Henry VIII of England; Elizabeth of England; Mary, Queen of France; Edmund, Duke of Somerset
- House: Tudor
- Father: Edmund Tudor, 1st Earl of Richmond
- Mother: Lady Margaret Beaufort

Henry VII (28 January 1457 – 21 April 1509), also known as Henry Tudor, was King of England and Lord of Ireland from his seizure of the crown on 22 August 1485 until his death in 1509. He was the first monarch of the House of Tudor. (Note: Henry was descended from the Welsh Tudors of Penmynydd.)

Henry was the son of Edmund Tudor, 1st Earl of Richmond, and Lady Margaret Beaufort, a great-granddaughter of John of Gaunt (son of Edward III) who founded the Lancastrian cadet branch of the House of Plantagenet. Thus Henry's claim to the English throne was as the great-great-great-grandson of Edward III.

Henry VII's father Edmund Tudor was the half-brother of the Lancastrian king Henry VI. Edmund died three months before his son was born, and Henry was raised by his uncle Jasper Tudor, a Lancastrian, and William Herbert, a supporter of the Yorkist branch of the House of Plantagenet. During Henry's early years, his uncles and the Lancastrians fought a series of civil wars against the Yorkist claimant, Edward IV. After Edward retook the throne in 1471, Henry spent 14 years in exile in Brittany. He attained the throne when his forces, supported by France and Scotland, defeated Richard III at the Battle of Bosworth Field. He was the last king of England to win his throne on the field of battle, defending it two years later at the Battle of Stoke Field to decisively end the Wars of the Roses (1455–1487). He strengthened his claim by marrying Elizabeth of York, Edward IV's daughter.

Henry restored power and stability to the English monarchy following the civil war. He is credited with many administrative, economic and diplomatic initiatives. His supportive policy toward England's wool industry and his standoff with the Low Countries had long-lasting benefits to the English economy. He paid very close attention to detail, and instead of spending lavishly, he concentrated on raising new revenues. He stabilised the government's finances by introducing several new taxes. After his death, a commission found widespread abuses in the tax collection process. Henry reigned for nearly 24 years and was peacefully succeeded by his son, Henry VIII.

== Ancestry and early life ==
Henry VII was born on 28 January 1457 at Pembroke Castle in the English-speaking portion of Pembrokeshire known as Little England beyond Wales. He was the only child of Lady Margaret Beaufort, who was 13 years old at the time, and Edmund Tudor, 1st Earl of Richmond, who, at 26, died three months before Henry's birth. He was probably baptised at St Mary's Church, Pembroke, though no documentation of the event exists. Henry's paternal grandfather, Owen Tudor, originally from the Tudors of Penmynydd, Isle of Anglesey in Wales, had been a page in the court of King Henry V. He rose to become one of the "Squires to the Body to the King" after military service at the Battle of Agincourt. Owen is said to have secretly married the widow of Henry V, Catherine of Valois. One of their sons was Edmund, Henry's father. Edmund was created Earl of Richmond in 1452 and "formally declared legitimate by Parliament".

The descent of Henry's mother, Margaret, through the legitimised House of Beaufort bolstered Henry's claim to the English throne. She was a great-granddaughter of John of Gaunt, 1st Duke of Lancaster (fourth son of Edward III), and his third wife Katherine Swynford. Swynford was Gaunt's mistress for about 25 years. When they married in 1396, they already had four children, including Henry's great-grandfather John Beaufort. Gaunt's nephew Richard II legitimised Gaunt's children by Swynford by letters patent in 1397. In 1407, Henry IV, Gaunt's son by his first wife, issued new letters patent confirming the legitimacy of his half-siblings but also declaring them ineligible for the throne. Henry IV's action was of doubtful legality, as the Beauforts were previously legitimised by a royal proclamation read in Parliament, but it weakened Henry's claim. Nonetheless, by 1483 Henry was the senior male claimant heir to the House of Lancaster remaining after the deaths in battle, by murder, or execution of Henry VI (son of Henry V and Catherine of Valois), his son Edward of Westminster, Prince of Wales, and the other Beaufort line of descent through Lady Margaret's uncle, Edmund Beaufort, 2nd Duke of Somerset.

Henry also made some political capital out of his Welsh ancestry in attracting military support and safeguarding his army's passage through Wales on its way to the Battle of Bosworth. He came from an old, established Anglesey family that claimed descent from Cadwaladr, in legend, the last ancient British king.

On occasion, Henry displayed the red dragon of Wales. He took it, as well as the standard of St. George, on his procession through London after the victory at Bosworth. A contemporary writer and Henry's biographer, Bernard André, also made much of Henry's Welsh descent.

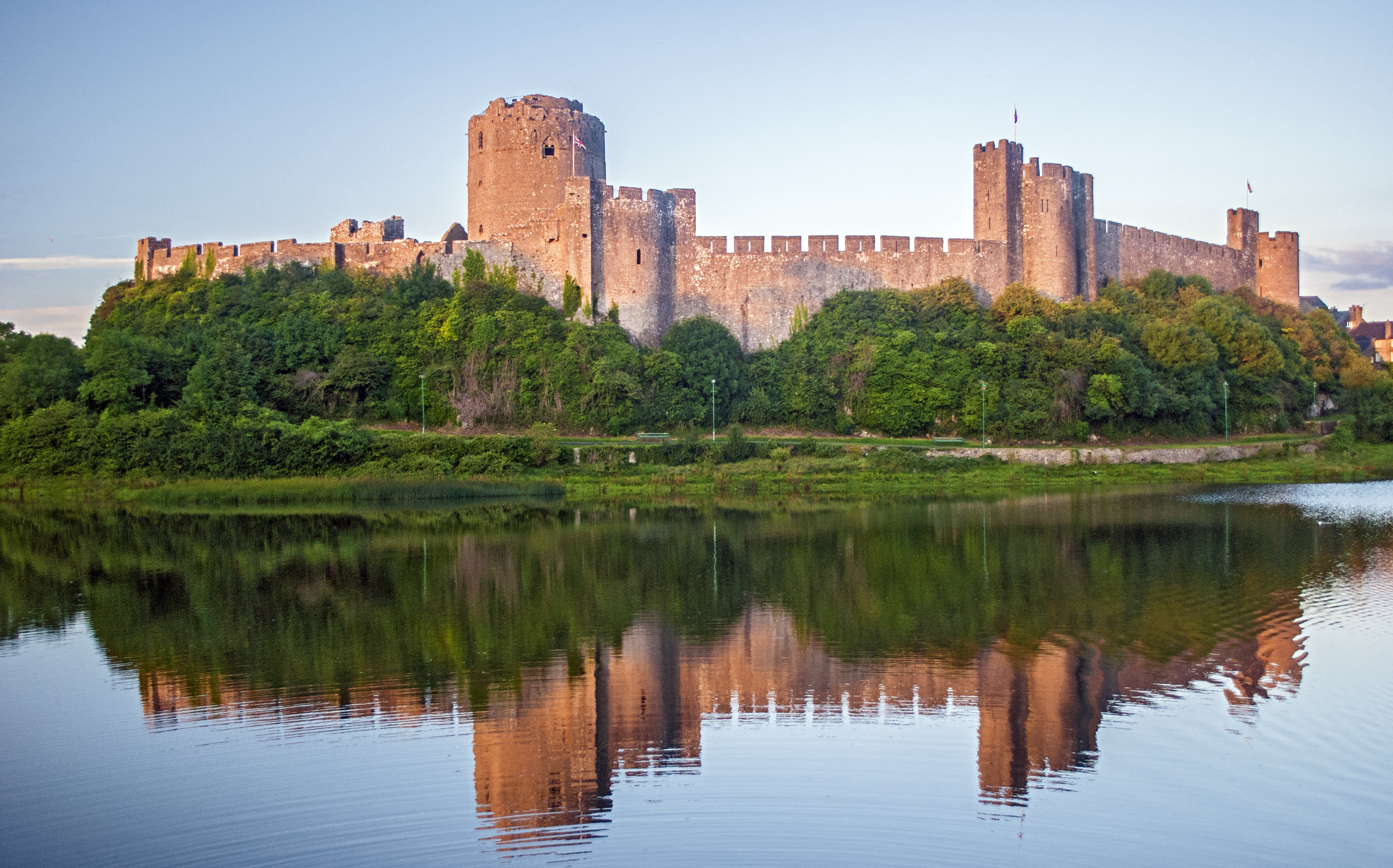
Pembroke Castle in Wales, the birthplace of Henry VII

In 1456, Henry's father, Edmund Tudor, was captured while fighting for Henry VI in South Wales against the Yorkists. He died shortly afterwards in Carmarthen Castle. His younger brother, Jasper Tudor, the Earl of Pembroke, undertook to protect Edmund's widow Margaret. When Edward IV became King in 1461, Jasper Tudor went into exile abroad. Pembroke Castle, and later the Earldom of Pembroke, were granted to the Yorkist William Herbert, who also assumed the guardianship of Margaret Beaufort and the young Henry.

Henry lived in the Herbert household until 1469, when Richard Neville, Earl of Warwick (the "Kingmaker"), went over to the Lancastrians. Herbert was captured fighting for the Yorkists and executed by Warwick. When Warwick restored Henry VI in 1470, Jasper Tudor returned from exile and brought Henry to court. When the Yorkist Edward IV regained the throne in 1471, Henry fled with other Lancastrians to Brittany. He spent most of the next 14 years under the protection of Francis II, Duke of Brittany. In November 1476, Francis fell ill and his principal advisers were more amenable to negotiating with King Edward. Henry was thus handed over to English envoys and escorted to the Breton port of Saint-Malo. While there, he feigned stomach cramps and delayed his departure long enough to miss the tides. An ally soon arrived in the person of Viscount Jean du Quélennec, bringing news that Francis had recovered, and in the confusion, Henry was able to flee to a monastery. There, he claimed sanctuary until the envoys were forced to depart.

== Rise to the throne ==
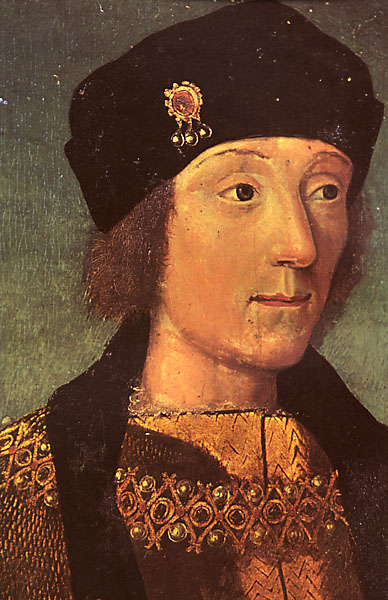
Young Henry VII, by a French artist (Musée Calvet, Avignon)

By 1483, Henry's mother was actively promoting him as an alternative to Richard III, despite her being married to Lord Stanley, a Yorkist. At Rennes Cathedral on Christmas Day 1483, Henry pledged to marry Elizabeth of York, the eldest daughter of Edward IV. She was Edward's heir since the presumed death of her brothers, the Princes in the Tower, King Edward V and Richard of Shrewsbury, Duke of York. With money and supplies borrowed from his host, Francis II of Brittany, Henry tried to land in England, but his conspiracy unravelled resulting in the execution of his primary co-conspirator, Henry Stafford, 2nd Duke of Buckingham. Now supported by Francis II's prime minister, Pierre Landais, Richard III attempted to extradite Henry from Brittany, but Henry escaped to France. He was welcomed by the French, who readily supplied him with troops and equipment for a second invasion. Henry gained the support of the Woodvilles, in-laws of the late Edward IV, and sailed with a small French and Scottish force, landing at Mill Bay near Dale, Pembrokeshire. He marched toward England accompanied by his uncle Jasper and John de Vere, 13th Earl of Oxford. Wales was historically a Lancastrian stronghold, and Henry owed the support he gathered to his Welsh birth and ancestry, being agnatically descended from Rhys ap Gruffydd. He amassed an army of about 5,000–6,000 soldiers.

Henry devised a plan to seize the throne by engaging Richard quickly because Richard had reinforcements in Nottingham and Leicester. Though outnumbered, Henry's Lancastrian forces decisively defeated Richard's Yorkist army at the Battle of Bosworth Field on 22 August 1485. Several of Richard's key allies, such as Henry Percy, 4th Earl of Northumberland, and also Lord Stanley and his brother William, crucially switched sides or left the battlefield. Richard III's death at Bosworth Field effectively ended the Wars of the Roses.

== Reign ==
To secure his hold on the throne, Henry declared himself king by right of conquest retroactively from 21 August 1485, the day before Bosworth Field. Thus, anyone who had fought for Richard against him would be guilty of treason and Henry could legally confiscate the lands and property of Richard III, while restoring his own. Henry spared Richard's nephew and designated heir, John de la Pole, Earl of Lincoln, and made the Yorkist heiress Margaret Plantagenet Countess of Salisbury suo jure. He took care not to address the baronage or summon Parliament until after his coronation, which took place in Westminster Abbey on 30 October 1485. After his coronation Henry issued an edict that any gentleman who swore fealty to him would, notwithstanding any previous attainder, be secure in his property and person.

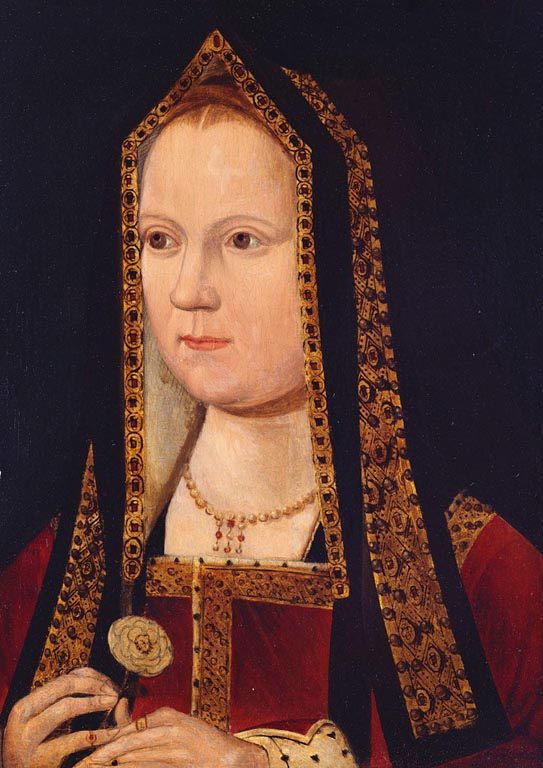
Queen Elizabeth, Henry's wife

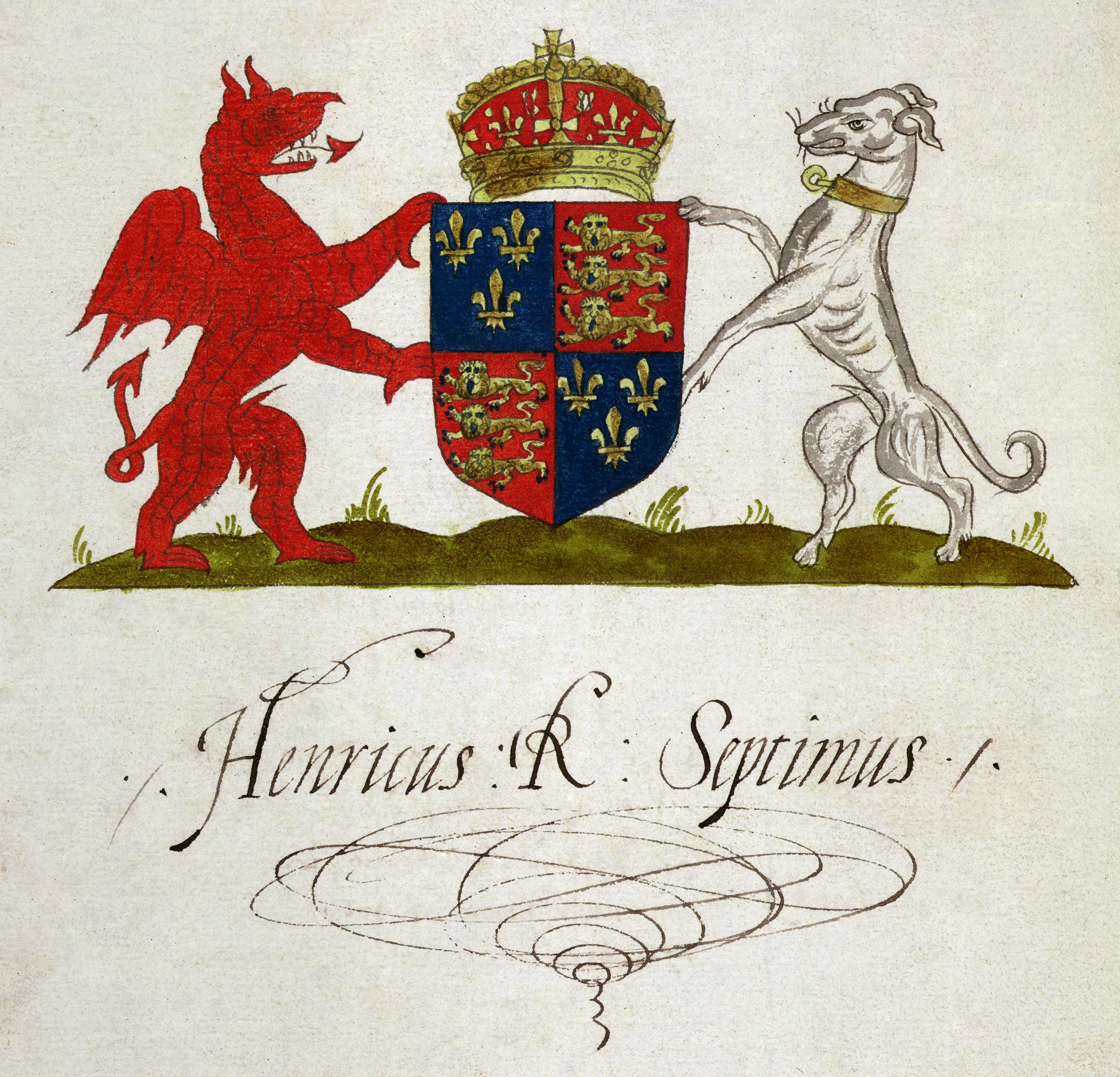
King Henry VII's coat of arms

Henry honoured his pledge of December 1483 to marry Elizabeth of York and the wedding took place in 1486 at Westminster Abbey. He was 29 years old, she was 20. They were third cousins, as both were great-great-grandchildren of John of Gaunt. Henry married Elizabeth of York with the hope of uniting the Yorkist and Lancastrian sides of the Plantagenet dynastic disputes, and he was largely successful. However, such a level of paranoia persisted that anyone (John de la Pole, Earl of Lincoln, for example) with blood ties to the Plantagenets was suspected of coveting the throne.

Henry had Parliament repeal Titulus Regius, the statute that declared Edward IV's marriage invalid and his children illegitimate, thus legitimising his wife. Amateur historians Bertram Fields and Sir Clements Markham have claimed that he may have been involved in the murder of the Princes in the Tower, as the repeal of Titulus Regius gave the Princes a stronger claim to the throne than his own. Alison Weir points out that the Rennes ceremony, two years earlier, was plausible only if Henry and his supporters were certain that the Princes were already dead. Henry secured his crown principally by dividing and undermining the power of the nobility, especially through the aggressive use of bonds and recognisances to secure loyalty. He also enacted laws against livery and maintenance, the great lords' practice of having large numbers of "retainers" who wore their lord's badge or uniform and formed a potential private army.

Henry began taking precautions against rebellion while still in Leicester after Bosworth Field. Edward, Earl of Warwick, the ten-year-old son of Edward IV's brother George, Duke of Clarence, was the senior surviving male of the House of York. Before departing for London, Henry sent Robert Willoughby to Sheriff Hutton in Yorkshire, to arrest Warwick and take him to the Tower of London. Despite such precautions, Henry faced several rebellions over the next twelve years. The first was the 1486 rebellion of the Stafford brothers, abetted by Viscount Lovell, which collapsed without fighting.

Next, in 1487, Yorkists led by Lincoln rebelled in support of Lambert Simnel, a boy they claimed to be Edward of Warwick (who was actually a prisoner in the Tower). The rebellion began in Ireland, where the historically Yorkist nobility, headed by the powerful Gerald FitzGerald, 8th Earl of Kildare, proclaimed Simnel king and provided troops for his invasion of England. The rebellion was defeated and Lincoln killed at the Battle of Stoke. Henry showed remarkable clemency to the surviving rebels: he pardoned Kildare and the other Irish nobles, and he made the boy, Simnel, a servant in the royal kitchen where he was in charge of roasting meats on a spit.

In 1490, a young Fleming, Perkin Warbeck, appeared and claimed to be Richard of Shrewsbury, the younger of the "Princes in the Tower". Warbeck won the support of Edward IV's sister Margaret, Duchess of Burgundy. He led attempted invasions of Ireland in 1491 and England in 1495, and persuaded James IV of Scotland to invade England in 1496. In 1497, Warbeck landed in Cornwall with a few thousand troops, but was soon captured and executed.

When the King's agents searched the property of William Stanley (Chamberlain of the Household, with direct access to Henry VII), they found a bag of coins amounting to around £10,000 and a collar of livery with Yorkist garnishings. Stanley was accused of supporting Warbeck's cause, arrested and later executed. In response to this threat within his own household, the King instituted more rigid security for access to his person. In 1499, Henry had the Earl of Warwick executed. However, he spared Warwick's elder sister Margaret, who survived until 1541 when she was executed by Henry VIII.

=== Economics ===
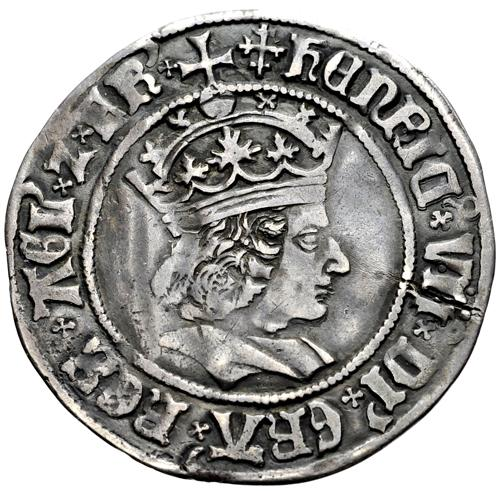
Groat of Henry VII

For most of Henry VII's reign Edward Story was Bishop of Chichester. Story's register still exists and, according to the 19th-century historian W.R.W. Stephens, "affords some illustrations of the avaricious and parsimonious character of the king". It seems that Henry was skilled at extracting money from his subjects on many pretexts, including that of war with France or war with Scotland. The money so extracted added to the King's personal fortune rather than being used for the stated purpose.

Unlike his predecessors, Henry VII came to the throne without personal experience in estate management or financial administration. Despite this, during his reign, he became a fiscally prudent monarch who restored the fortunes of an effectively bankrupt exchequer. Henry VII introduced stability to the financial administration of England by keeping the same financial advisors throughout his reign. For instance, except for the first few months of the reign, the Baron Dynham and the Earl of Surrey were the only Lord High Treasurers throughout his reign.

Henry VII improved tax collection in the realm by introducing ruthlessly efficient mechanisms of taxation. He was supported in this effort by his chancellor, Archbishop John Morton, whose "Morton's Fork" was a catch-22 method of ensuring that nobles paid increased taxes: those nobles who spent little must have saved much, and thus could afford the increased taxes; in contrast, those nobles who spent much obviously had the means to pay the increased taxes. Henry also increased wealth by acquiring land through the act of resumption of 1486, which had been delayed as he focused on the defence of the Church, his person and his realm.

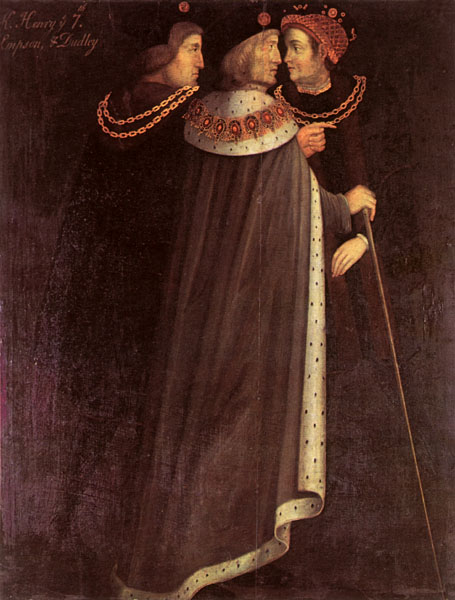
Henry VII (centre), with his advisors Sir Richard Empson and Edmund Dudley

The capriciousness and lack of due process that had indebted many would tarnish his legacy and were soon ended upon Henry VII's death, after a commission revealed widespread abuses. According to the contemporary historian Polydore Vergil, simple "greed" underscored the means by which royal control was over-asserted in Henry's final years. Following Henry VII's death, Henry VIII executed Richard Empson and Edmund Dudley, his two most hated tax collectors, on trumped-up charges of treason.

Henry VII established the pound avoirdupois as a standard of weight; it later became part of the Imperial and customary systems of units. In 1506, he resumed the construction of King's College Chapel, Cambridge, started under Henry VI, guaranteeing finances which would continue even after his death.

=== Foreign policy ===
Henry VII's policy was to maintain peace and to create economic prosperity. To a degree, he succeeded. The Treaty of Redon was signed in February 1489 between Henry and representatives of Brittany. Based on the terms of the accord, Henry sent 6,000 troops to fight (at the expense of Brittany) under the command of Lord Daubeney. The purpose of the agreement was to prevent France from annexing Brittany. According to John M. Currin, the treaty redefined Anglo-Breton relations. Henry started a new policy to recover Guyenne and other lost Plantagenet claims in France. The treaty marks a shift from neutrality over the French invasion of Brittany to active intervention against it.

Henry later concluded a treaty with France at Etaples, which brought money into the coffers of England and ensured the French would not support pretenders to the English throne, such as Perkin Warbeck. However, this treaty came at a price, as Henry mounted a minor invasion of Brittany in November 1492. Henry decided to keep Brittany out of French hands, signed an alliance with Spain to that end, and sent 6,000 troops to France. The confused, fractious nature of Breton politics undermined his efforts, which finally failed after three sizeable expeditions, costing £24,000. However, as France was becoming more concerned with the Italian Wars, the French were happy to agree to the Peace of Étaples. Henry had pressured the French by laying siege to Boulogne in October 1492. Henry had been under the financial and physical protection of the French throne or its vassals for most of his life before becoming king. To strengthen his position, however, he subsidised shipbuilding, so strengthening the navy (he commissioned Europe's first ever – and the world's oldest surviving – dry dock at Portsmouth in 1495) and improving trading opportunities. John Cabot, originally from Genoa and Venice, had heard that ships from Bristol had discovered uncharted, newfound territory far west of Ireland. Having secured financial backing from Florentine bankers in London, Cabot was granted carefully phrased letters patent from Henry in March 1496, permitting him to embark on an exploratory voyage westward. It is unknown precisely where Cabot landed, but he was eventually rewarded with a pension from the king; it is presumed that Cabot perished at sea after a later unsuccessful expedition.

Henry VII was one of the first European monarchs to recognise the importance of the newly united Spanish kingdom; he concluded the Treaty of Medina del Campo, by which his son Arthur, Prince of Wales, was married to Catherine of Aragon. He also concluded the Treaty of Perpetual Peace with Scotland (the first treaty between England and Scotland for almost two centuries), which betrothed his daughter Margaret Tudor to King James IV of Scotland. By this marriage, Henry VII hoped to break the Auld Alliance between Scotland and France. Though this was not achieved during his reign, the marriage eventually led to the union of the English and Scottish crowns under Margaret's great-grandson, James VI and I, following the death of Henry's granddaughter Elizabeth I. Henry also formed an alliance with Holy Roman Emperor Maximilian I (1493–1519) and persuaded Pope Innocent VIII to issue a papal bull of excommunication against all pretenders to Henry's throne.

In 1506, Grand Master of the Knights Hospitaller Emery d'Amboise asked Henry VII to become the protector and patron of the Order, as he had an interest in the crusade. Later on, Henry had exchanged letters with Pope Julius II in 1507, in which he encouraged him to establish peace among Christian realms, and to organise an expedition against the Turks of the Ottoman Empire.

=== Trade agreements ===
Henry VII was much enriched by trading alum, which was used in the wool and cloth trades as a chemical fixative for dyeing fabrics. Since alum was mined in only one area in Europe (Tolfa, Italy), it was a scarce commodity and therefore especially valuable to its landholder, the Pope. With the English economy heavily invested in wool production, Henry VII became involved in the alum trade in 1486. With the assistance of the Italian merchant banker Lodovico della Fava and the Italian banker Girolamo Frescobaldi, Henry VII became deeply involved in the trade by licensing ships, obtaining alum from the Ottoman Empire, and selling it to the Low Countries and in England. This trade made an expensive commodity cheaper, which raised opposition from Pope Julius II, since the Tolfa mine was a part of papal territory and had given the Pope monopoly control over alum.

Henry's most successful diplomatic achievement as regards the economy was the Magnus Intercursus ("great agreement") of 1496. In 1494, Henry embargoed trade (mainly in wool) with the Burgundian Netherlands in retaliation for Margaret of Burgundy's support for Perkin Warbeck. The Merchant Adventurers, the company which enjoyed the monopoly of the Flemish wool trade, relocated from Antwerp to Calais. At the same time, Flemish merchants were ejected from England. The dispute eventually paid off for Henry. Both parties realised they were mutually disadvantaged by the reduction in commerce. Its restoration by the Magnus Intercursus was very much to England's benefit in removing taxation for English merchants and significantly increasing England's wealth. In turn, Antwerp became an extremely important trade entrepôt (transhipment port), through which, for example, goods from the Baltic, spices from the east and Italian silks were exchanged for English cloth.

In 1506, Henry extorted the Treaty of Windsor from Philip the Handsome, Duke of Burgundy. Philip had been shipwrecked on the English coast, and while Henry's guest, was bullied into an agreement so favourable to England at the expense of the Netherlands that it was dubbed the Malus Intercursus ("evil agreement"). France, Burgundy, the Holy Roman Empire, Spain and the Hanseatic League all rejected the treaty, which was never in force. Philip died shortly after the negotiations.

=== Law enforcement and justices of the peace ===
Henry's principal problem was to restore royal authority in a realm recovering from the Wars of the Roses. There were too many powerful noblemen and, as a consequence of the system of so-called bastard feudalism, each had what amounted to private armies of indentured retainers (mercenaries masquerading as servants). Following the example of Edward IV, Henry VII created a Council of Wales and the Marches for his son Arthur, which was intended to govern Wales and the Marches, Cheshire and Cornwall.

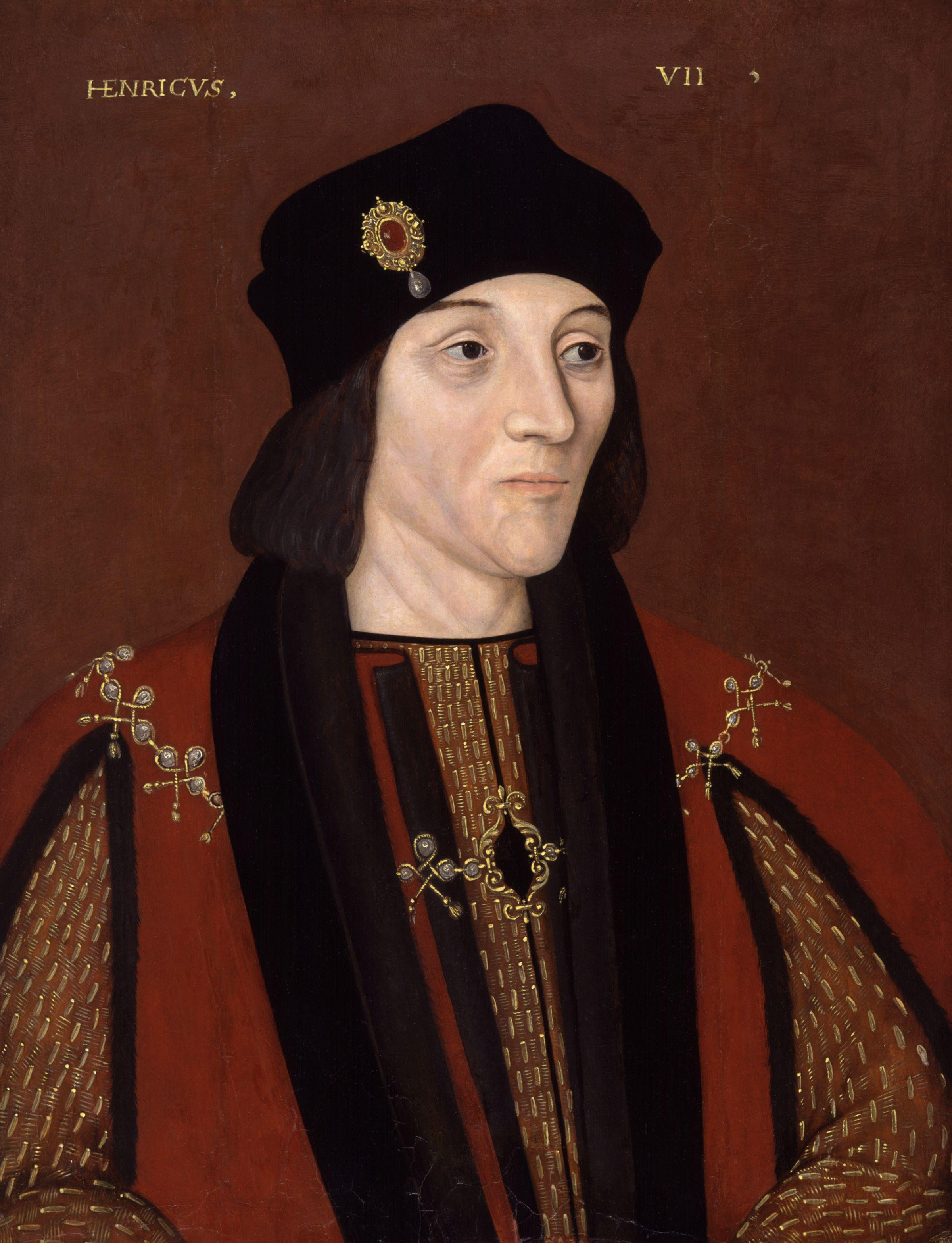
Late 16th-century copy of a portrait of Henry VII

He was content to allow the nobles their regional influence if they were loyal to him. For instance, the Stanley family had control of Lancashire and Cheshire, upholding the peace on the condition that they stayed within the law. In other cases, he brought his over-powerful subjects to heel by decree. He passed laws against "livery" (the upper classes' flaunting of their adherents by giving them badges and emblems) and "maintenance" (the keeping of too many male "servants"). These laws were used shrewdly in levying fines upon those that he perceived as threats.

However, his principal weapon was the Court of Star Chamber. This revived an earlier practice of using a small (and trusted) group of the Privy Council as a personal or Prerogative Court, able to cut through the cumbersome legal system and act swiftly. Serious disputes involving the use of personal power, or threats to royal authority, were thus dealt with.

Henry VII used justices of the peace on a large, nationwide scale. They were appointed for every shire and served for a year at a time. Their chief task was to see that the laws of the country were obeyed in their area. Their powers and numbers steadily increased during the time of the Tudors, never more so than under Henry's reign. Despite this, Henry was keen to constrain their power and influence, applying the same principles to the justices of the peace as he did to the nobility: a similar system of bonds and recognisances to that which applied to both the gentry and the nobles who tried to exert their elevated influence over these local officials.

All Acts of Parliament were overseen by justices of the peace. For example, they could replace suspect jurors in accordance with the 1495 act, preventing the corruption of juries. They were also in charge of various administrative duties, such as the checking of weights and measures.

By 1509, justices of the peace were key enforcers of law and order for Henry VII. They were unpaid, which, in comparison with modern standards, meant a smaller tax bill for law enforcement. Local gentry saw the office as one of local influence and prestige and were therefore willing to serve. Overall, this was a successful area of policy for Henry, both in terms of efficiency and as a method of reducing the corruption endemic within the nobility of the Middle Ages.

=== Later years and death ===
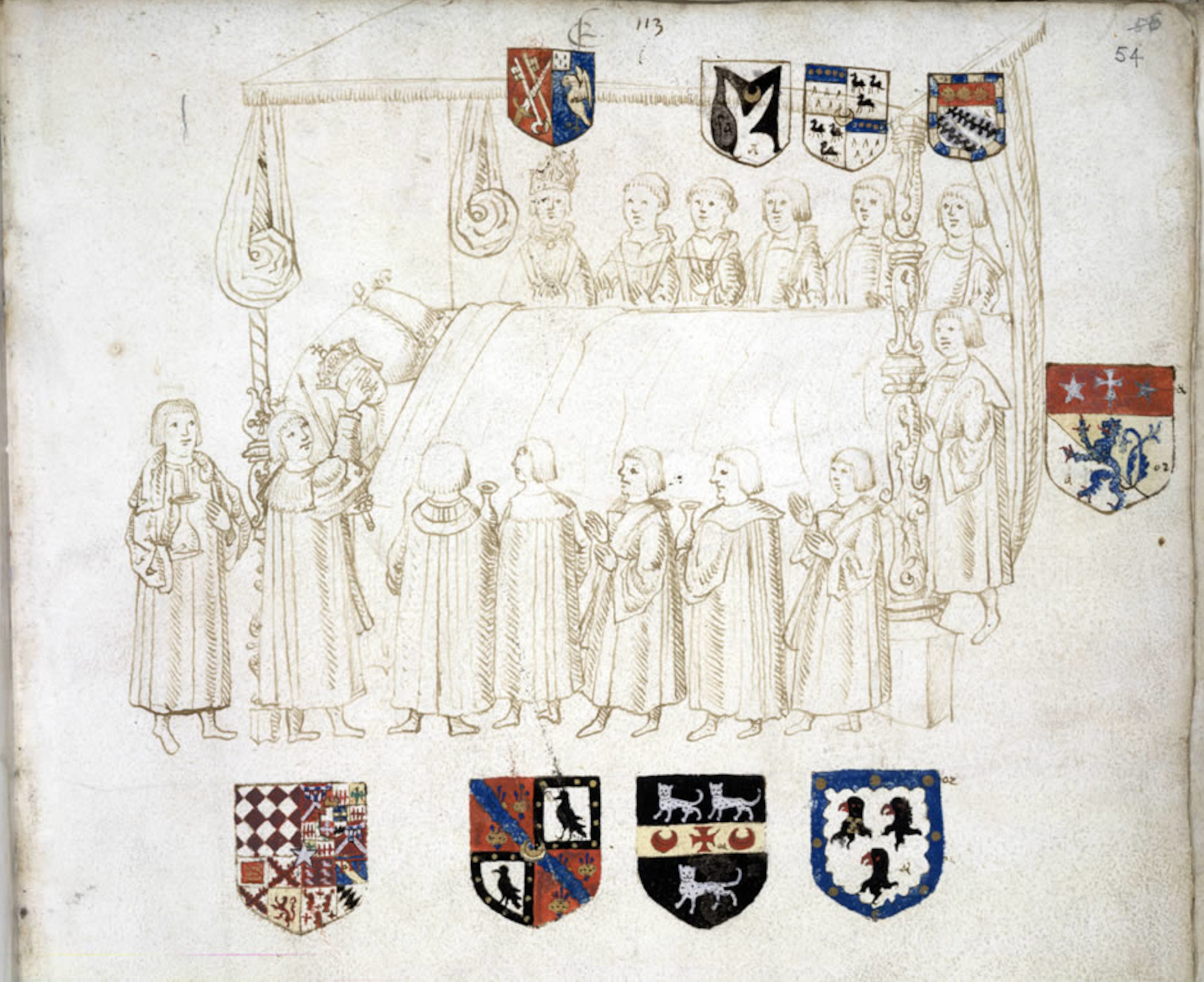
Scene at the deathbed of Henry VII at Richmond Palace (1509) drawn contemporaneously from witness accounts by the courtier Sir Thomas Wriothesley (d.1534) who wrote an account of the proceedings. British Library, Add.MS 45131, f.54

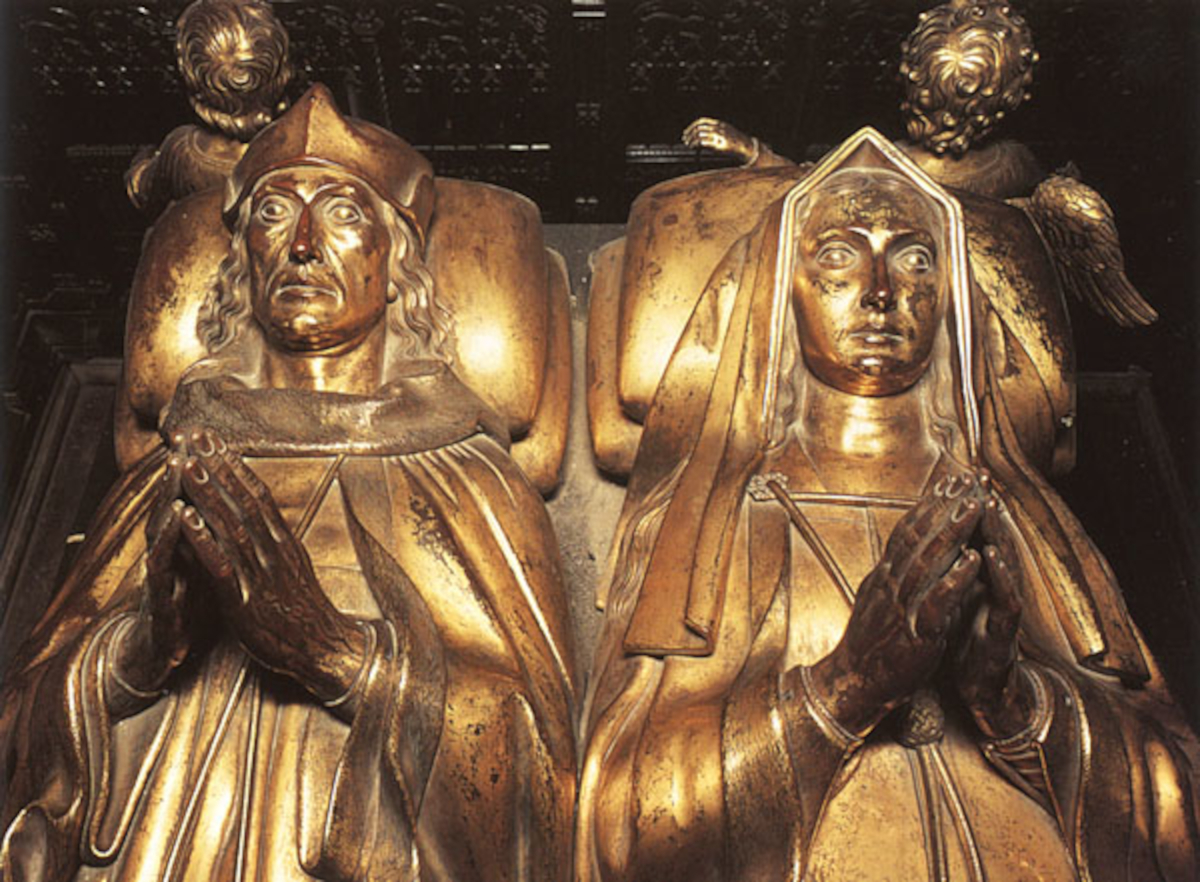
Tomb effigies of Henry VII and Elizabeth of York, by Pietro Torrigiano, Westminster Abbey

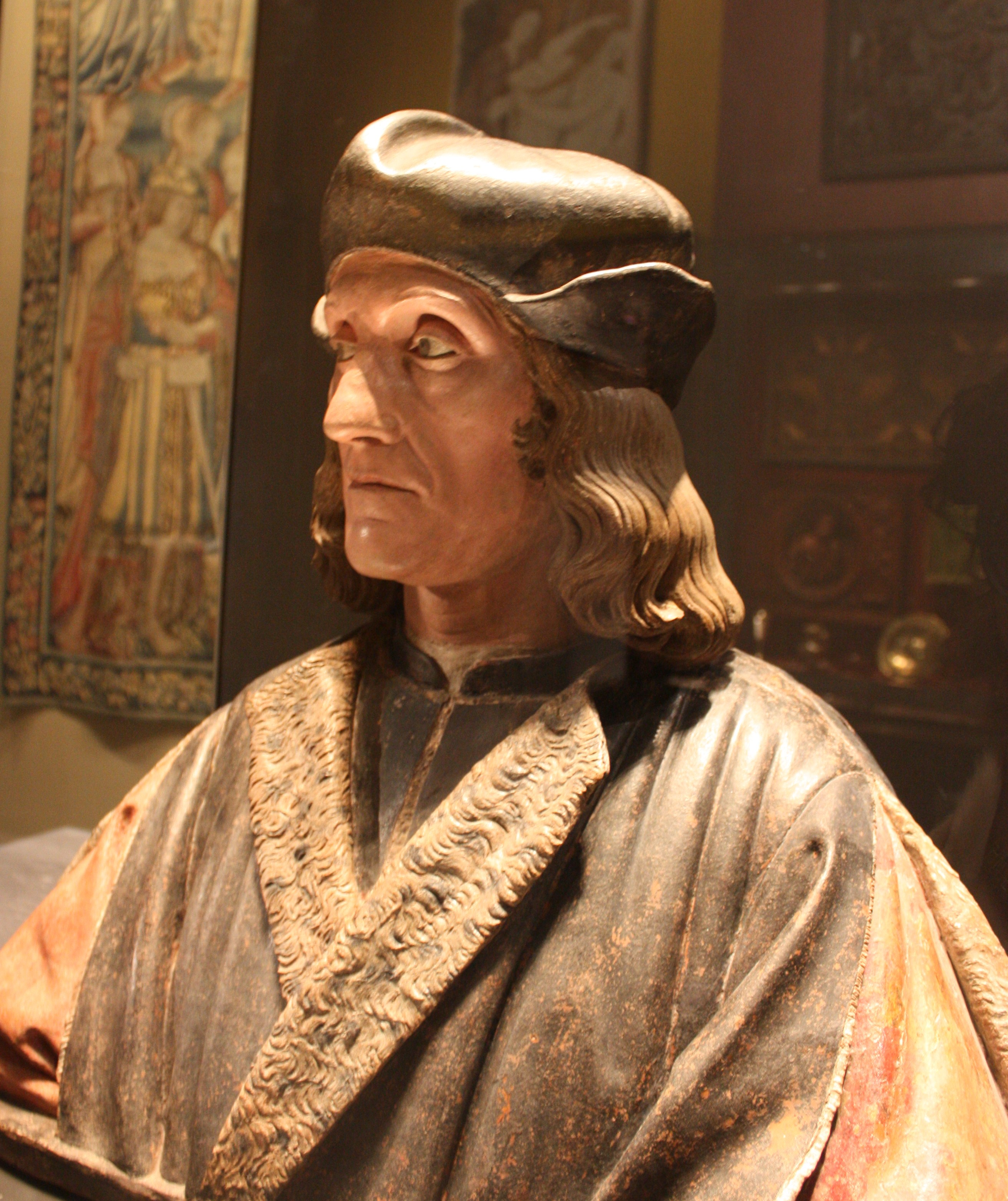
Posthumous portrait bust by Pietro Torrigiano made using Henry's death mask

In 1502, Henry VII's life took a difficult and personal turn in which many people he was close to died in quick succession. His first son and heir apparent, Arthur, Prince of Wales, died suddenly at Ludlow Castle, very likely from a viral respiratory illness known at the time as the "English sweating sickness". This made Henry VII's second son, Henry, Duke of York, heir apparent to the throne. The King, normally a reserved man who rarely showed much emotion in public unless angry, surprised his courtiers with his intense grief and sobbing at his son's death. His concern for the Queen is evidence that the marriage was a happy one, as is his reaction to Queen Elizabeth's death the following year, when he shut himself away for several days, refusing to speak to anyone. Henry VII was shattered by the loss of Elizabeth, and her death affected him severely.

Henry wanted to maintain the Spanish alliance. Accordingly, he arranged a papal dispensation from Pope Julius II for Prince Henry to marry his brother's widow Catherine, a relationship that would have otherwise precluded marriage in the Church. After obtaining the dispensation, Henry had second thoughts about the marriage of his son and Catherine. Catherine's mother Isabella I of Castile had died and Catherine's sister Joanna had succeeded her; Catherine was, therefore, daughter of only one reigning monarch and so less desirable as a wife for Henry VII's heir apparent. The marriage did not take place during his lifetime. Otherwise, at the time of his father's arranging of the marriage to Catherine of Aragon, the future Henry VIII was too young to contract the marriage according to Canon Law and would be ineligible until age 14.

Henry made half-hearted plans to remarry and beget more heirs, but these never came to anything. He entertained thoughts of remarriage to renew the alliance with Spain; Joanna, Dowager Queen of Naples (niece of Queen Isabella of Castile), Queen Joanna of Castile, and Margaret, Dowager Duchess of Savoy (sister-in-law of Joanna of Castile) were all considered. In 1505 he was sufficiently interested in a potential marriage to Joanna of Naples that he sent ambassadors to Naples to report on the 27 year-old Joanna's physical suitability. The wedding never took place.

Henry VII falls among the minority of British monarchs who never had any known mistresses, and, for the times, it is unusual that he did not remarry. His son Henry VIII was the only male heir left after the death of his wife; the death of Arthur therefore created a precarious political position for the House of Tudor.

During Henry VII's lifetime, the nobility often criticised him for re-centralising power in London and, later, the 16th-century historian Francis Bacon was ruthlessly critical of the methods by which he enforced tax law. It is equally true that Henry VII was diligent about keeping detailed records of his personal finances, down to the last halfpenny; these and one account book detailing the expenses of his queen survive in the British National Archives, as do courtiers' accounts and many of the king's own letters. From these accounting books, the evidence is clear that, until the death of his wife, Henry was a more doting father and husband than was widely known, and there is evidence that his outwardly austere personality belied a devotion to his family. Letters to relatives have an affectionate tone not captured in official state business, as evidenced by many written to his mother, Margaret. Many of the entries show a man who loosened his purse strings generously for his wife and children – and not just for necessities. After Elizabeth's death, the possibilities for such family indulgences greatly diminished. Henry became very sick and nearly died, allowing only his mother Margaret Beaufort near him: "privily departed to a solitary place, and would that no man should resort unto him." Further compounding Henry's distress, within months of her mother's death, his older daughter Margaret, who had previously been betrothed to King James IV of Scotland, had to be escorted to the border by her father: he would never see her again. Margaret wrote letters to her father declaring her homesickness, but Henry could do nothing but mourn the loss of his family and honour the terms of the peace treaty he had agreed to with the King of Scotland.

Henry VII died of tuberculosis at Richmond Palace on 21 April 1509 and was buried in the chapel he commissioned in Westminster Abbey next to his wife, Elizabeth. He was succeeded by his second son, Henry VIII (reigned 1509–1547), who would initiate the Protestant Reformation in England. His mother died two months later on 29 June.

== Appearance and character ==
Amiable and high-spirited, Henry was friendly if dignified in manner, and it was clear that he was extremely intelligent. His biographer, Professor Stanley Chrimes, credits him – even before he had become king – with "a high degree of personal magnetism, ability to inspire confidence, and a growing reputation for shrewd decisiveness". On the debit side, he may have looked a little delicate as he suffered from poor health.

== Comparison with contemporaries ==
Historians have compared Henry VII with his continental contemporaries, especially Louis XI of France and Ferdinand II of Aragon. By 1600, historians emphasised Henry's wisdom in drawing lessons in statecraft from other monarchs. In 1622, Francis Bacon published his History of the Reign of King Henry VII. By 1900 the "New Monarchy" interpretation stressed the common factors that in each country led to the revival of monarchical power. This approach raised puzzling questions about similarities and differences in the development of national states. In the late 20th century a model of European state formation was prominent in which Henry less resembles Louis and Ferdinand.

== Family ==
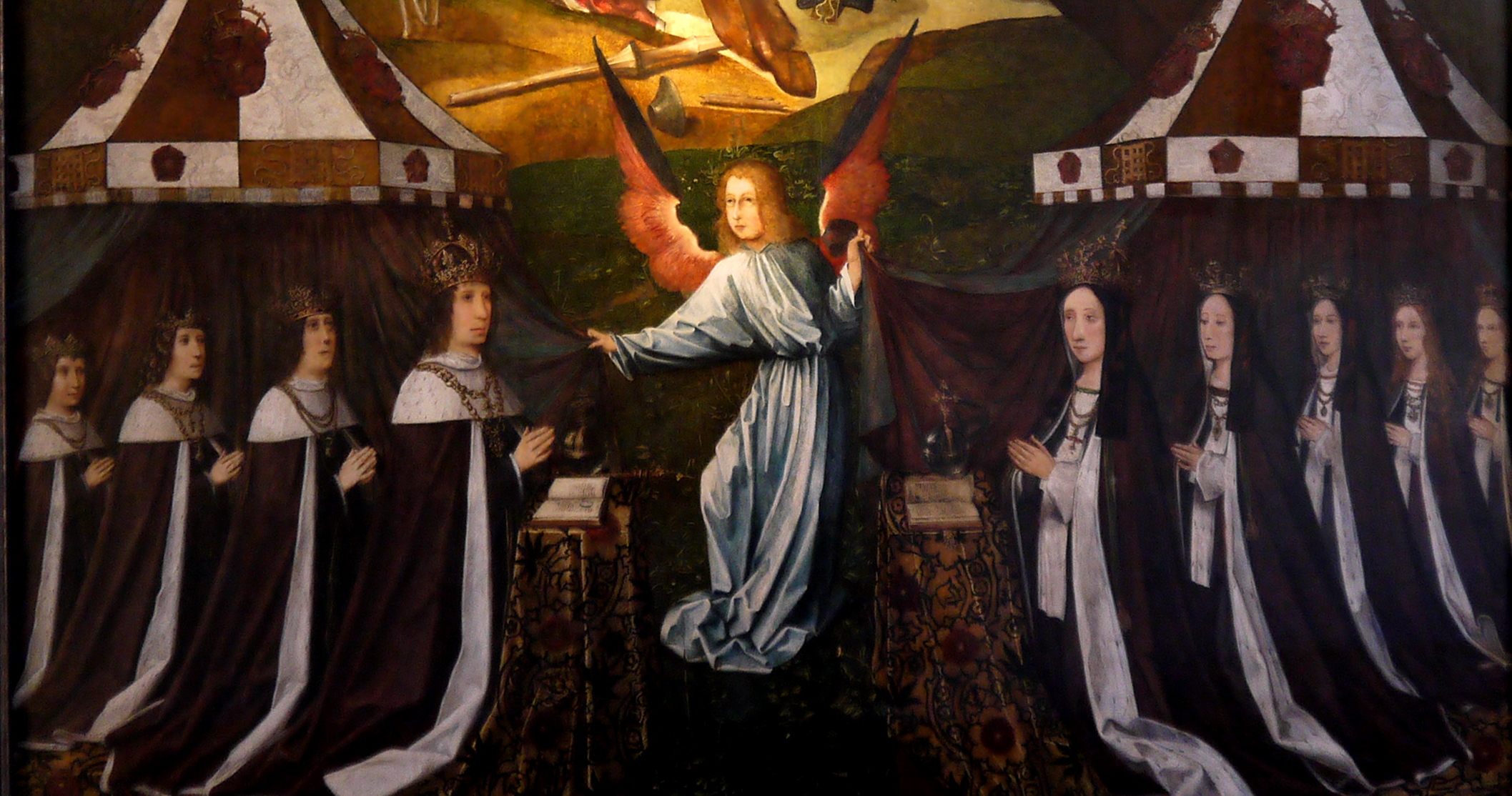
Henry VII (centre left) with his family, as depicted at Hampton Court Palace

=== Issue ===
Henry VII and Elizabeth had seven children: (Note: Roland de Velville (or Veleville), who was knighted in 1497 and was Constable of Beaumaris Castle, is sometimes presented as the illegitimate son of Henry VII of England by "a Breton lady whose name is not known". The possibility this was Henry's illegitimate son is baseless.)

- Arthur (19 September 1486 – 2 April 1502), Prince of Wales, heir apparent from birth to death (named after the legendary King Arthur). He was married to Catherine of Aragon, daughter of Isabella I of Castile and Ferdinand II of Aragon.
- Margaret (28 November 1489 – 18 October 1541), Queen of Scotland as the wife of James IV and regent for their son James V. She was the paternal grandmother of Mary, Queen of Scots.
- Henry VIII (28 June 1491 – 28 January 1547), Henry VII's successor. He was the father of Mary I (by his older brother's widow Catherine of Aragon), Elizabeth I (by Anne Boleyn) and Edward VI (by Jane Seymour).
- Elizabeth (2 July 1492 – 14 September 1495)
- Mary (18 March 1496 – 25 June 1533), briefly Queen of France as the wife of Louis XII, then wife of Charles Brandon, 1st Duke of Suffolk. She was the maternal grandmother of Lady Jane Grey, who became Queen of England for nine days.
- Edmund (21 February 1499 – 19 June 1500), styled Duke of Somerset but never formally created a peer.
- Katherine (2 February 1503 – 18 February 1503)

=== Family tree ===
Henry VII's position in relation to the houses of York and Lancaster (selective chart)

Edward III
Blanche of Lancaster	John of Gaunt; Duke of Lancaster	Katherine Swynford	Edmund of Langley; Duke of York
Henry IV	John Beaufort; Earl of Somerset	Joan Beaufort	Richard of Conisburgh; Earl of Cambridge
Henry V	Catherine of Valois	Owen Tudor	John Beaufort; Duke of Somerset	Cecily Neville	Richard; Duke of York
Henry VI	Edmund Tudor; Earl of Richmond	Margaret Beaufort	Edward IV	Richard III
Henry VII	Elizabeth of York	Edward V

== See also ==
- Cestui que
- Cultural depictions of Henry VII of England

== Notes ==
Henry VII of England House of Tudor Born: 28 January 1457 Died: 21 April 1509
Regnal titles
Preceded by Richard III	King of England; Lord of Ireland; 1485–1509	Succeeded by Henry VIII
Peerage of England
Preceded by Edmund Tudor	Earl of Richmond; 1457–1461	Forfeit
