= Treaty of Medina del Campo (1489) =

1489 treaty between England and Spain

The Treaty of Medina del Campo was an agreement developed on March 26, 1489 between England and the nascent Spain. Its provisions accomplished three goals: the establishment of a common policy for the two countries regarding France, the reduction of tariffs between the two countries, and, most centrally, the arrangement of a marriage contract between Arthur Tudor, eldest son of Henry VII of England, and Catherine of Aragon, daughter of Isabella I of Castile and Ferdinand II of Aragon. The treaty was signed on March 27 by the Spanish sovereigns, but its ratification by Henry did not occur until September 1490 by the Treaty of Woking.

== Clauses ==
The treaty was made up of twenty-six clauses. The first sixteen dealt with military, economic, and political relations between England and Spain. The seventeenth clause consisted of the marriage between Catherine and Arthur, while the following ten clauses covered the financial settlement, succession, and Catherine's journey arrangements to England.

== Cause for treaty ==
Henry VII Tudor had risen to the throne of England with his victory over Richard III Plantagenet at the Battle of Bosworth Field. Henry's claim to the throne of England lacked almost all validity by heredity; his possession of the crown was primarily by right of conquest, and he faced a host of claimants still alive with arguably better legal claims. By contrast, Ferdinand II of Aragon and Isabella I of Castile were secure upon what was soon to be the united throne of Spain. They were looking for help against their hereditary enemy, France. Henry had a new son, the Spanish rulers a very young daughter; a marriage and alliance would help each. Henry would gain the acceptance of his position by a major foreign power, and the Spanish would obtain military help against France.

== Marriage offer ==
By March 1487, an offer of marriage had been made by the Spanish monarchs to Henry. Negotiations speedily resulted in an agreement in principle. The terms were set down to paper on March 26, 1489. They included clauses requiring England and Spain to come to each other's aid should they declare war upon France. However, the exact terms were much more favorable to the Spanish; England was required to support Spain militarily so long as the Spanish were still at war, unless the English had recovered the province of Guyenne. By comparison, the Spanish were able to retire from military support if they recovered from France the much smaller districts of Roussillon and Cerdanya. The treaty established that Arthur and Catherine were to marry, and also established a dowry for Catherine of 200,000 crowns. Finally, by the provisions of the treaty, certain tariffs were to be dropped between the countries, allowing a more free trade to develop, though it did cost Castilian merchants certain privileges of theirs. The Spanish rulers signed the treaty the next day.

== Treaty ratification ==
Henry, however, did not ratify the treaty right away. Henry's foreign policy during 1489 and 1490 attempted to obtain substantial support from either the Spanish monarchs or Maximilian I Habsburg, the Holy Roman Emperor, before he would commit to war against France. By September 1490 however, he was in a position to attempt a three-way alliance with Spain and the Habsburgs, and ratified the Treaty of Medina del Campo September 23. At the same time, an additional treaty was offered, modifying the terms of the Treaty of Medina del Campo, upon which Henry's assent was conditioned. This treaty was eventually rejected by the Spanish rulers; in the end, the terms of the Treaty of Medina del Campo went largely unexecuted. Eventually, the terms regarding the marriage were renegotiated in 1492, and again in 1497. The two royal children were finally married November 1501; Arthur died five months later.

== See also ==
- List of treaties
- Medina del Campo
