= Zapardiel de la Cañada =

- Municipality
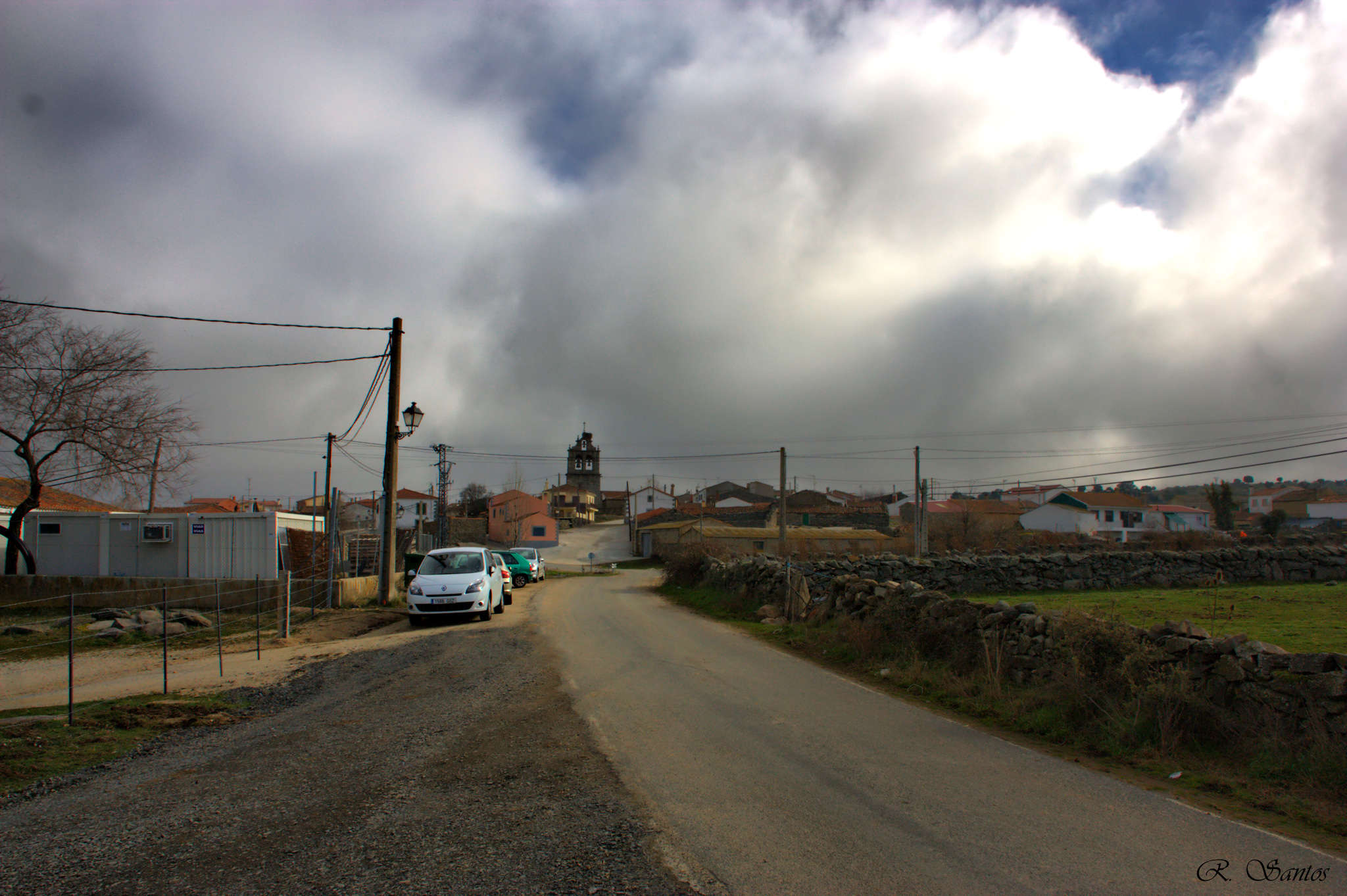
- Panorama of Zapardiel de la Cañada

- Flag Coat of arms

- Location in Spain. Zapardiel de la Cañada (Spain)
- Coordinates: 40°36′21″N 5°20′24″W
- Country: Spain
- Autonomous community: Castile and León
- Province: Ávila
- Municipality: Zapardiel de la Cañada

Area
  - Total: 40 km^{2} (15 sq mi)
- Elevation: 1,148 m (3,766 ft)

Population (2025-01-01)
  - Total: 83
  - Density: 2.1/km^{2} (5.4/sq mi)
- Time zone: UTC+1 (CET)
  - Summer (DST): UTC+2 (CEST)
- Website: Official website

Zapardiel de la Cañada is a municipality located in the province of Ávila, Castile and León, Spain.

== Population ==
Historical population
Year	Pop.	±% p.a.
2023	83	—
2024	84	+1.20%
2025	83	−1.19%
Source: INE
