= Peace of Étaples =

Treaty between England and France in 1492

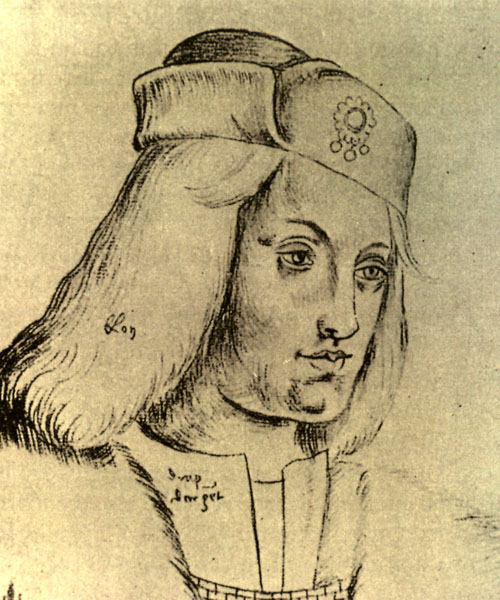
- Contemporary engraving of the Yorkist Pretender, Perkin Warbeck
- Type: Bilateral peace treaty
- Signed: November 2, 1492
- Location: Étaples, France
- Ratified: December 1492
- Original signatories: England; France

The Peace of Étaples was signed on 3 November 1492 in Étaples between Charles VIII of France and Henry VII of England. Charles agreed to end his support for the Yorkist Pretender Perkin Warbeck, in return for being recognised as ruler of the Duchy of Brittany.

The agreement ended an English invasion of France that was launched in response to French support for the Yorkist Pretender and Flemish native Perkin Warbeck. An English army of 26,000 landed at Calais in October and besieged Boulogne. Signed on 2 November, Charles VIII of France agreed to end support for Warbeck and pay an indemnity of £159,000, while Henry VII of England accepted French rights to the Duchy of Brittany. The agreement was ratified in December.

Henry presented the treaty as a demonstration of English strength, in which he forced Charles to sue for peace, and the expulsion of Warbeck from France removed a key enemy. His abandonment of the Bretons was a reversal of the 1489 Treaty of Redon, but in reality, Brittany had already recognised French suzerainty through the marriage of Anne of Brittany to Charles in December 1491.

In July 1498, Louis XII renewed the treaty prior to his invasion of Italy in 1499.

In 1510, the councillors of Henry VIII renewed the treaty and sought a continuation of peace.

== See also ==
- List of treaties

== Sources ==
- Chimes, SB (1959). An Introduction to the Administrative History of Medieval England (1980 ed.). Wiley Blackwell. ISBN 978-0631121411.
- Mackie, T. D. (2009) [1947]. "Henry VIII and Scotland". Transactions of the Royal Historical Society. 29. Cambridge University Press (CUP): 93–114. doi:10.2307/3678551. ISSN 0080-4401. JSTOR 3678551.
- Mallett, Michael; Shaw, Christine (2012). The Italian Wars: 1494–1559. Pearson Education. ISBN 978-0582057586.
