= Treaty of Redon =

1489 treaty between Brittany and England

The Treaty of Redon was signed on 10 February 1489 in Redon, Ille-et-Vilaine between Henry VII of England and representatives of Brittany. Based on the terms of the accord, Henry sent 6000 English troops to fight (at the expense of Brittany) under the command of Lord Daubeney. The purpose of the agreement was to prevent France from annexing Brittany. Despite the military support Henry provided, the Bretons were divided and had unreliable allies. It marked a transition from the policy pursued by the Plantagenets, of acquiring and holding territories in France, to a more defensive, Anglo-centric policy. According to Currin, the treaty redefined Anglo-Breton relations, Henry started a new policy to recover Guyenne and other lost Plantagenet claims in France. The treaty marks a shift from neutrality over the French invasion of Brittany to active intervention against it.

== Background ==
The situation arose in 1487, as Anne of Beaujeau, regent (and older sister) of the minor French King Charles VIII planned to marry her brother to Anne of Brittany, daughter of the ageing Duke Francis of Brittany. The intention was to ultimately incorporate the autonomous Duchy of Brittany into the French royal domain.

In an attempt to avoid annexation, in 1486, Duke Francis arranged for his daughter to be married to Maximilian, heir of the Holy Roman Emperor. The Duke of Brittany also established contact with Anne of Beaujeau's enemies within France. In response, the French sent an Army into Brittany in 1488. Maximilian, now engaged to Anne of Brittany, sent a force of 1500 men to reinforce Brittany, followed by an additional 1000 troops reluctantly supplied by Ferdinand II of Aragon.

Henry VII, having only seized the throne of England in 1485, had adopted a policy of defence while he consolidated his position, however a number of factors prevented him from continuing his non-interventionist policy with regard to French involvement in Brittany. Firstly, Brittany had sheltered him during his exile, and Henry VII owed his position as King of England to this assistance from the Duke of Brittany. Secondly, Brittany was an important trading partner, with whom Henry VII had been trading since 1486. Thirdly, the geographical position of Brittany would make it intolerable to allow the French to take control of; it would give them complete control of the southern shore of the English Channel, enhancing the ability of the French to harass English shipping and increasing the military ability of the French to launch an invasion of England.

Upon the French invasion of Brittany, therefore, Henry found himself at an impasse; Henry VII had kept England at peace with France since his accession and was also indebted to France as they had financed and supplied a force of mercenaries for his campaign against Richard III in 1485, yet he was also indebted to Brittany for sheltering him while he was in exile, while allowing the French to control Brittany was strategically unwise. Originally, therefore, Henry VII resolved to send a small volunteer force of a few hundred men under Lord Scales to reinforce Brittany, while attempting to act as mediator between Brittany and France. After the decisive defeat of the Bretons at the Battle of St-Aubin-du-Cormier in 1488, however, Henry disowned these men and renewed the truce with France.

The situation became more complicated, however, when three weeks after the capitulation of Brittany, the elderly Duke Francis died and his daughter Anne became Duchess of Brittany. The French claimed custody of the 12-year-old Duchess and it seemed that the incorporation of Brittany into France was inevitable.

As to the business of Brittaine, the King answered in few words. That the French King and the Duke of Brittaine were the two persons to whome he was most obliged of all men; and that he should think himself very unhappy if things should go so between them, as he should not be able to acquit himself in gratitude towards them both; and that there was no means for him, as a Christian King and a common friend to them...but to offer himself for a mediator of an accord and oeace between them; by which course he doubted not but the king's estate and honour, both would be preserved with more safety and less envy than by a war...he was utterly unwilling...to enter into a war with France. A fame of war he liked well but not an achievement; for one he thought would make him richer, and the other poorer; and he was possessed with many secret fears touching his own people, which he was therefore loth to arm, and put weapons into their hands. Yet notwithstanding (as a prudent and courageous prince) he was not so averse from a war but that he resolved to choose it rather than to have Brittaine carried by France; being so great and opulent a duchy and situate so opportunely to annoy England either for coast or trade.

— Francis Bacon, History of the Reign of King Henry the Seventh, 1621

== The Treaty ==
Henry VII's response to the imminent annexation of Brittany into France was to sign the Treaty of Redon on 10 February 1489, It was then ratified on 1 April by Henry VII and on 19 May by Anne of Brittany. According to the treaty Henry promised 6000 troops as long as the Bretons financed their deployment. Henry's attitude, however, remained one of restraint, having been placed in a precarious situation between two countries who had been instrumental in his rise to the English throne; the number of men that Henry chose to send was relatively small in comparison to his campaign in Northern France in late 1492, in which he personally led a force of 26,000 men. Furthermore, Henry VII was anxious to emphasise that the presence of English troops in Brittany was not for the purpose of conquest; in January 1489, the papal ambassador in England wrote in a dispatch to Pope Innocent VIII that Henry "is compelled at present to defend Breton interests, both on account of the immense benefits conferred on him by the late Duke in the time of his misfortunes, and likewise for the defence of his own kingdom".

Indeed, the contribution of the Holy Roman Empire and Spain was also piecemeal; the presence of Maximilian's troops was heavily dependent upon his commitments elsewhere around the Habsburg Empire, while the 2000 troops sent by Spain in 1490 were withdrawn by the end of the year to combat the Moors in Granada.

== Outcome ==
In December 1491, the Bretons accepted defeat and allowed Duchess Anne to be married to King Charles VIII. The marriage ended any pretense of Breton independence. Henry VII was now faced with a dilemma; he could attempt to liberate Brittany, or he could opt for offensive action against France. Henry was well aware that England was in no position to challenge France, but chose to launch an offensive in Northern France late in the campaign season of 1491 aimed at coercing the French into signing a peace treaty with England that would be favourable to Henry. This culminated in the Treaty of Etaples in 1492, under which the French would pay the equivalent of £5000 a year to Henry - 5% of his annual income - in return for English withdrawal.

== See also ==
- List of treaties

== Sources ==
- Currin, John M. "Henry VII and the Treaty of Redon (1489): Plantagenet Ambitions and Early Tudor Foreign Policy." History 81.263 (1996): 343-358. Online
- Currin, John M. "Persuasions to peace: the Luxembourg-Marigny-Gaguin Embassy and the state of Anglo-French relations, 1489-90." English Historical Review 113.453 (1998): 882-904.
- Encarta Encyclopedia - Henry VII of England.
- Morris, Terence Alan. Europe and England in the Sixteenth Century. Routledge Taylor and Francis Group, 1998. ISBN 0-415-15041-8
- Turvey, Roger, and Caroline Rogers. Henry VII (2nd ed. Hodder & Stoughton, 2000).
