= Saint-Thois =

Saint-Thois Santoz
- Commune
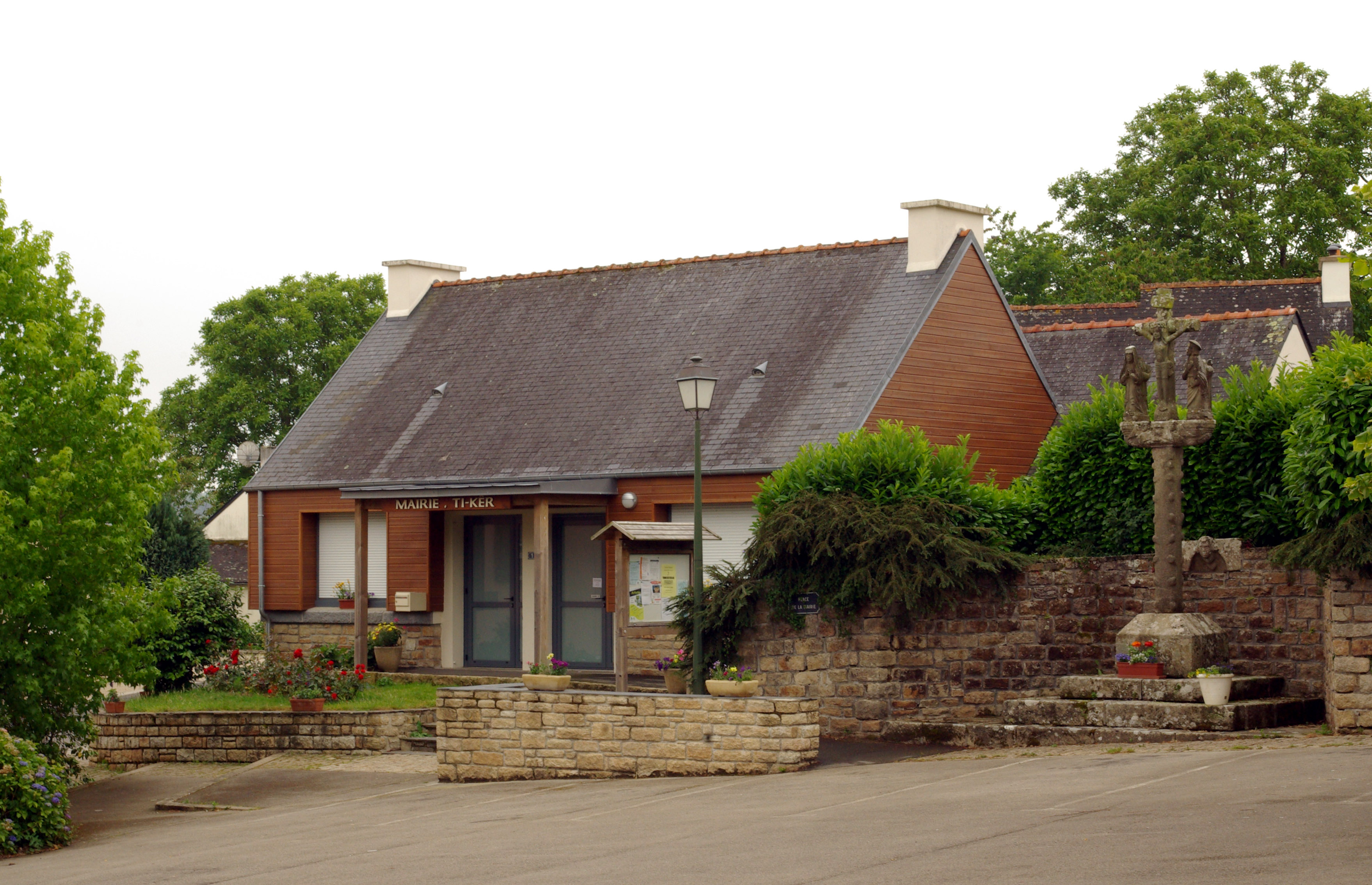
- The town hall in Saint-Thois
- Location of Saint-Thois
- Location within France Location within Brittany
- Coordinates: 48°09′57″N 3°53′00″W
- Country: France
- Region: Brittany
- Department: Finistère
- Arrondissement: Châteaulin
- Canton: Briec
- Intercommunality: Haute Cornouaille

Government
  - Mayor (2020–2026): Bernard Saliou
- Area^{1}: 18.10 km^{2} (6.99 sq mi)
- Highest elevation: 238 m (781 ft)
- Lowest elevation: 28 m (92 ft)
- Population (2023): 703
  - Density: 38.8/km^{2} (101/sq mi)
- Time zone: UTC+01:00 (CET)
  - Summer (DST): UTC+02:00 (CEST)
- INSEE/Postal code: 29267 /29520
- ^{1} French Land Register data, which excludes lakes, ponds, glaciers > 1 km^{2} (0.386 sq mi or 247 acres) and river estuaries.

Saint-Thois (French pronunciation: [sɛ̃ twa]; Breton: Santoz) is a commune in the Finistère department of Brittany in north-western France.

== Population ==
Inhabitants of Saint-Thois are called in French Saint-Thoisiens.

Historical population

| Year | Pop. | ±% p.a. |
|---|---|---|
| 1793 | 852 | — |
| 1800 | 738 | −2.03% |
| 1806 | 959 | +4.46% |
| 1821 | 840 | −0.88% |
| 1831 | 963 | +1.38% |
| 1836 | 1,021 | +1.18% |
| 1841 | 1,039 | +0.35% |
| 1846 | 1,089 | +0.94% |
| 1851 | 1,082 | −0.13% |
| 1856 | 1,003 | −1.50% |
| 1861 | 1,010 | +0.14% |
| 1866 | 1,187 | +3.28% |
| 1872 | 1,067 | −1.76% |
| 1876 | 1,191 | +2.79% |
| 1881 | 1,200 | +0.15% |
| 1886 | 1,218 | +0.30% |
| 1891 | 1,231 | +0.21% |
| 1896 | 1,215 | −0.26% |
| 1901 | 1,262 | +0.76% |

| Year | Pop. | ±% p.a. |
|---|---|---|
| 1906 | 1,315 | +0.83% |
| 1911 | 1,429 | +1.68% |
| 1921 | 1,476 | +0.32% |
| 1926 | 1,385 | −1.26% |
| 1931 | 1,360 | −0.36% |
| 1936 | 1,358 | −0.03% |
| 1946 | 1,152 | −1.63% |
| 1954 | 1,011 | −1.62% |
| 1962 | 910 | −1.31% |
| 1968 | 821 | −1.70% |
| 1975 | 760 | −1.10% |
| 1982 | 704 | −1.09% |
| 1990 | 633 | −1.32% |
| 1999 | 634 | +0.02% |
| 2007 | 720 | +1.60% |
| 2012 | 708 | −0.34% |
| 2017 | 716 | +0.22% |
| 2023 | 703 | −0.30% |

Source: EHESS and INSEE (1968-2023)

== See also ==
- Communes of the Finistère department
