= Commercial treaty =

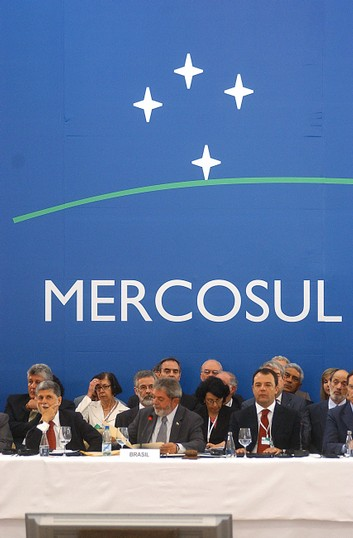
MERCOSUR is an example of a commercial treaty between Southern Cone countries.

A commercial treaty is a formal agreement between states for the purpose of establishing mutual rights and regulating conditions of trade. It is a bilateral act whereby definite arrangements are entered into by each contracting party towards the other—not mere concessions. According to Britannica, a treaty is a binding formal agreement, contract, or other written instrument that establishes obligations between two or more subjects of international law, primarily states and international organizations. The rules governing treaties between states are outlined in the Vienna Convention on the Law of Treaties (1969), while those pertaining to treaties between states and international organizations are specified in the Vienna Convention on the Law of Treaties Between States and International Organizations or Between International Organizations (1986). In essence, a treaty is a legally binding document that creates rights and responsibilities among parties. It is expected to be executed in good faith, adhering to the principle of pacta sunt servanda (Latin for “agreements must be kept”), which is arguably the oldest principle of international law.

It is important to recognize that trade agreements offer important advantages. For example, Amadeo explains that free trade agreements contribute to foreign investment. Investors will flock to the country. This adds capital to expand local industries and boost national businesses. He also contributes US dollars to many previously isolated countries (2022).

== Examples ==
For example, the Methuen Treaty was a commercial treaty between Portugal and England.

Another example, between the close of the Napoleonic Wars of 1815 and the year 1860, the tariff system of United Kingdom was changed from elaborate protection to practically complete free trade. An attempt had indeed been made in 1786 to modify the rigidly protective legislation of the 18th century. In that year Pitt concluded a commercial treaty with France, providing for large reductions of duties in both countries.

But the treaty was swept away with the outbreak of the wars with France, and accordingly the old system was still in force in 1815. The first important step, and in some respects the decisive step, towards modifying it was taken in 1824, under the policy of William Huskisson. In that year, and again in 1825, great reductions were made in the duties on raw materials, especially on wool, raw silk, flax, and iron, while considerable reductions were also made in the duties on manufactured goods. The most sharply contested of the changes was in regard to silks, which had been completely prohibited, and were now admitted at a duty of 30 per cent. A considerable breach was thus made in the protective system; and some further changes in the same direction were made in the next decade, especially under Lord Althorp in 1833. But in the decade from 1830 to 1840 the Corn Laws were the chief subject of contention.

The great increase in population since the middle of the 18th century had made England a corn-importing country, especially with the rapid growth of manufactures in the early years of the 19th century. The first systematic Corn Laws imposing duties on grain had been passed in 1773. From 1816 onwards a series of measures were passed, all designed to maintain the high price of grain. The act of Parliament of 1816 prohibited the importation of wheat when the price was less than 80 shillings a quarter (=$2.50 a bushel). In 1822 the prohibitive point was lowered to 70 shillings. In 1828 the sliding scale was introduced, under which the duty went up and down as the price of grain went down and up; and it was against this form of the Corn Law that the great agitation led by Cobden and Bright was directed after 1830. For a long time the anti-Corn-Law agitation seemed to have no effect, although conducted with extraordinary skill and enthusiasm. In 1842, however, Sir Robert Peel made the first important concession, by modifying the sliding scale, his opponent, Lord John Russell, having proposed in the previous year a fixed duty of 8 shillings a quarter. In view of the bad harvest of 1845–46, and the famine in Ireland.

In 1846, Peel surrendered, and proposed in 1846 the admission of grain with only a fixed duty of one shilling a quarter as a registration fee. This change was carried, but Peel, being able to carry only a fraction of his party with him, was compelled shortly afterwards to resign. The Corn Laws had great political strength, serving as they did the interests of the landowners, whose hold on parliament was still very strong; but the general economic situation in Great Britain, from the rapid growth of the manufacturing population and the imperative need of more food, made the abolition inevitable. After having been maintained till the middle of the century, apparently with irresistible support, they suddenly collapsed under the strain of a season of exceptionally short crops. Both their continued maintenance and their final sudden abolition are in some respects divergent from the general course of British tariff history.

== See also ==
- International investment agreement
- Free trade agreement
