= Treaty of Dordrecht =

1489 treaty between the Holy Roman Empire and England

The Treaty of Dordrecht was signed on 14 February 1489 between Maximilian I, King of the Germans (the future Holy Roman Emperor) and King Henry VII of England. Based on the terms of the treaty, both parties agree to establish an alliance in order to help the Duchy of Brittany against an attack by the Kingdom of France.

== See also ==
- List of treaties
