= Intellectual property organization =

Organization focused on intellectual property law concepts

Intellectual property organizations are organizations that are focused on copyrights, trademarks, patents, or other intellectual property law concepts. This includes international intergovernmental organizations that foster governmental cooperation in the area of copyrights, trademarks and patents (such as organizations based on or founded by treaty), as well as non-governmental, non-profit organizations, lobbying organizations, think tanks, notable committees, and professional associations.

== International, general organisations ==
- World Intellectual Property Organization (WIPO)
- African Regional Intellectual Property Organization (ARIPO)
- Organisation Africaine de la Propriété Intellectuelle (OAPI) or African Intellectual Property Organization

== Regional, patent-related organisations ==
- Eurasian Patent Organization (EAPO)
- European Patent Organisation (EPO or EPOrg)
- Patent Office of the Cooperation Council for the Arab States of the Gulf (GCC)

== Regional, trademark- and design-related organisations ==
- European Union Intellectual Property Office (EUIPO)
- Benelux Office for Intellectual Property (BOIP)

== Think tanks, committees, institutes, non-profit and professional organizations ==
- AHRC Research Centre for Studies in Intellectual Property and Technology Law (SCRIPT)
- Alliance for American Innovation (AAIUSA)
- American Bar Association (Section of Intellectual Property Law or ABA-IPL)
- Association of Intellectual Property Firms (AIPF)
- American Intellectual Property Law Association (AIPLA)
- Asian Patent Attorneys Association (APAA)
- Arab Society for Intellectual Property (ASIP)
- Association française des Spécialistes en Propriété industrielle de l'Industrie (ASPI)
- Boston Patent Law Association (BPLA)
- Centre for International Industrial Property Studies (CEIPI)
- Center for Intellectual Property Studies (CIP)
- Chartered Institute of Patent Attorneys (CIPA)
- China Trademark Association (CTA)
- National Company of Industrial Property Attorneys (CNCPI)
- European Federation of Industrial Property Agents in Industry (FEMIPI)
- European Intellectual Property Institutes Network (EIPIN)
- European Patent Institute (epi)
- European Patent Lawyers Association (EPLAW)
- European Round Table on Patent Practice (EUROTAB)
- Federation Against Copyright Theft (FACT)
- German Association for the Protection of Intellectual Property (GRUR e. V.)
- Institute of Patentees and Inventors
- Institute of Trade Mark Attorneys (ITMA)
- Intellectual Property Institute (IP Institute)
- Intellectual Property Owners Association (IPO)
- Intellectual Property Regulation Board (IPReg)
- International Association for the Advancement of Teaching and Research in Intellectual Property (ATRIP)
- International Association for the Protection of Intellectual Property (AIPPI)
- International Federation of Intellectual Property Attorneys (FICPI)
- International Intellectual Property Alliance (IIPA)
- International Intellectual Property Commercialization Council (IIPCC)
- International Intellectual Property Institute (IIPI)
- International Intellectual Property Society (IIPS)
- International Intellectual Property Law Association (IIPLA)
- International Trademark Association (INTA)
- InventorEd (InvEd)
- Inventors Network of the Capital Area (INCA)
- IP Federation (formerly the "Trade Marks, Patents and Designs Federation" or TMPDF)
- Japan Intellectual Property Association (JIPA)
- Japan Patent Attorneys Association (JPAA)
- Licensing Executives Society International (LESI or LES Int.)
- Max Planck Institute for Innovation and Competition
- Munich Intellectual Property Law Center (MIPLC)
- National Association of Patent Practitioners (NAPP)
- New York Intellectual Property Law Association (NYIPLA)
- Patent Commons
- Patent Office Practitioners Association (POPA)
- Patent Information Users Group (PIUG)
- Pirate Party
- Professional Inventors Alliance (PIAUSA)
- Public Interest Intellectual Property Advisors (PIIPA)
- Public Knowledge (PK)
- Public Patent Foundation (PUBPAT)
- Queen Mary Intellectual Property Research Institute
- Software Patent Institute (SPI)
- Standing Advisory Committee before the European Patent Office (SACEPO)
- UNION of European Practitioners in Intellectual Property (UNION-IP)
- Universities Allied for Essential Medicines (UAEM)

== Defunct organisations ==
- International Patent Institute (IIB)
- The United States Patent Association
- United International Bureaux for the Protection of Intellectual Property (BIRPI)

== See also ==
- Patent attorney
- Patent examiner
