= Malcolm Royal =

Australian lawyer (1941–2006)

Malcolm Royal (25 April 1941 – 21 October 2006) was an Australian patent and trade mark attorney and intellectual property law educator.

== Education and career ==
Royal was born in the Melbourne suburb of Richmond. He graduated from Footscray Technical College (now part of Victoria University) with a Diploma in Applied Chemistry in 1958. After graduating, he worked as the Australian Patent, Trade Mark and Designs Office in Canberra, Australia as an Examiner of Patents. Malcolm loved education. While still at the Patent Office, he began a Training Office in Patent Law. In 1964, he left the Patent Office and joined the Commonwealth Scientific and Industrial Research Organisation to work in their Patent Licensing Section. His role there was to assist in the commercialisation of inventions developed by scientists and engineers, many of them of world prominence, who worked with or for CSIRO.

Royal joined the Australian patent attorney firm Phillips Ormonde & Fitzpatrick in 1970, and qualified as a registered patent attorney in 1971 and became a partner in 1972. He became managing partner of the firm in 1990 and held this position until 2005.

== Professional memberships and affiliations ==
Royal was an active member of the Royal Australian Chemical Institute; the Institute of Patent and Trade Mark Attorneys of Australia (IPTA); International Federation of Intellectual Property Attorneys (FICPI); the Intellectual Property Society of Australia and New Zealand, Inc; the Licensing Executives Society International (LESI); the Asian Patent Attorneys Association (APAA); and the International Association for the Protection of Industrial Property (AIPPI). He was also a member of the Royal Society of Australia.

Royal was involved in many committees in the above organisations. He was International President of FICPI from 2000 to 2003; President of IPTA from 2004 until early 2006; Chair of IPTA Academy of Education from 1995 to 2004; and President of the FICPI Training and Education Commission from 1998 to 2000 and again from 2003.

== Patent attorney education ==
Royal provided many tutorial sessions in a wide range of subjects for the Patent Attorney Professional Standards Board (now the Professional Standards Board for Patent and Trade Mark Attorneys. He was a member of the Advisory Board of the Graduate Program in Intellectual Property Law at the University of Melbourne from 2000 to 2003; a Member of the Intellectual Property Advisory Board at Monash University from 2001; and a member of the Singapore Patent Attorney Qualifying Examination Committee from 2002 to 2005.

When the Australian Government reviewed the training and professional qualification regimes for Australian Patent and Trade Mark Attorneys, Royal was involved in making (and having adopted) many of the changes as a member of each of the Professional Standards Board for Patent and Trade Marks Attorneys, the Advisory Council for Industrial Property and the Intellectual Property Working Party for Federal Government Innovation Summit from 2000. Malcolm also played a significant role in establishing the IPTA Academy of Education.

== Personal life ==
Royal married Margaret (Maggie) Lizst in 1964. His recreational interests included trail-bike riding, windsurfing and golf. He died of brain cancer and was survived by his wife and three daughters.
