= Industrial production =

Measure of the output of a given industrial sector

Industrial production is a measure of output of the industrial sector of the economy. The industrial sector includes manufacturing, mining, and utilities. Although these sectors contribute only a small portion of gross domestic product (GDP), they are highly sensitive to interest rates and consumer demand. This makes industrial production an important tool for forecasting future GDP and economic performance. Industrial production figures are also used by central banks to measure inflation, as high levels of industrial production can lead to uncontrolled levels of consumption and rapid inflation.

== See also ==
- Index of industrial production
- Industrial Production Index
