= IIPS =

IIPS may refer to:

- International Indian Public School, Riyadh, a K–12 school in as-Sulaimaniyah, Riyadh, Saudi Arabia
- International Institute for Population Sciences, a training and research organization based in Govandi, Mumbai, India
- International Intellectual Property Society, an organization of intellectual property lawyers
- Interoperable Instant Payment System, a national digital payment platform being developed by the central bank of Bangladesh

== See also ==
- IIP (disambiguation)
