= 1988 NCAA Men's Basketball All-Americans =

- Awarded for: 1987–88 NCAA Division I men's basketball season

The Consensus 1988 College Basketball All-American team, as determined by aggregating the results of four major All-American teams. To earn "consensus" status, a player must win honors from a majority of the following teams: the Associated Press, the USBWA, The United Press International and the National Association of Basketball Coaches.

== 1988 Consensus All-America team ==
Consensus First Team
Player	Position	Class	Team
Sean Elliott	F	Junior	Arizona
Gary Grant	G	Senior	Michigan
Hersey Hawkins	G	Senior	Bradley
Danny Manning	F	Senior	Kansas
J.R. Reid	F/C	Sophomore	North Carolina

Consensus Second Team
Player	Position	Class	Team
Danny Ferry	F	Junior	Duke
Jerome Lane	F	Junior	Pittsburgh
Mark Macon	G	Freshman	Temple
Mitch Richmond	G	Senior	Kansas State
Rony Seikaly	C	Senior	Syracuse
Michael Smith	F/C	Junior	Brigham Young

== Individual All-America teams ==
All-America Team
All-America Team	First team		Second team		Third team	
All-America Team	Player	School	Player	School	Player	School
Associated Press	Sean Elliott	Arizona	Danny Ferry	Duke	Will Perdue	Vanderbilt
Associated Press	Gary Grant	Michigan	Jerome Lane	Pittsburgh	Michael Smith	Brigham Young
Associated Press	Hersey Hawkins	Bradley	Mark Macon	Temple	Fennis Dembo	Wyoming
Associated Press	Danny Manning	Kansas	Jeff Grayer	Iowa State	Sherman Douglas	Syracuse
Associated Press	J. R. Reid	North Carolina	Steve Kerr	Arizona	Byron Larkin	Xavier
USBWA	Sean Elliott	Arizona	Danny Ferry	Duke	No third team	
USBWA	Gary Grant	Michigan	Jerome Lane	Pittsburgh	No third team	
USBWA	Hersey Hawkins	Bradley	Michael Smith	Brigham Young	No third team	
USBWA	Danny Manning	Kansas	Mitch Richmond	Kansas State	No third team	
USBWA	J. R. Reid	North Carolina	Rony Seikaly	Syracuse	No third team	
NABC	Sean Elliott	Arizona	Danny Ferry	Duke	Will Perdue	Vanderbilt
NABC	Gary Grant	Michigan	David Rivers	Notre Dame	Rex Chapman	Kentucky
NABC	Hersey Hawkins	Bradley	Mark Macon	Temple	Harvey Grant	Oklahoma
NABC	Danny Manning	Kansas	Rony Seikaly	Syracuse	Todd Mitchell	Purdue
NABC	J. R. Reid	North Carolina	Charles Smith	Pittsburgh	Steve Kerr	Arizona
UPI	Sean Elliott	Arizona	J. R. Reid	North Carolina	Harvey Grant	Oklahoma
UPI	Danny Ferry	Duke	Sherman Douglas	Syracuse	Jeff Grayer	Iowa State
UPI	Gary Grant	Michigan	Michael Smith	Brigham Young	Rony Seikaly	Syracuse
UPI	Hersey Hawkins	Bradley	Mitch Richmond	Kansas State	Lionel Simmons	La Salle
UPI	Danny Manning	Kansas	Byron Larkin	Xavier	Rod Strickland	DePaul

AP Honorable Mention:

- Dana Barros, Boston College
- Ricky Berry, San Jose State
- Rex Chapman, Kentucky
- Derrick Chievous, Missouri
- Derrick Coleman, Syracuse
- Hank Gathers, Loyola Marymount
- Harvey Grant, Oklahoma
- Skip Henderson, Marshall
- Troy Lewis, Purdue
- Dan Majerle, Central Michigan
- Vernon Maxwell, Florida
- Darryl Middleton, Baylor
- Todd Mitchell, Purdue
- Dyron Nix, Tennessee
- Daren Queenan, Lehigh
- Mitch Richmond, Kansas State
- David Rivers, Notre Dame
- Lionel Simmons, La Salle
- Charles Smith, Pittsburgh
- Rik Smits, Marist

== Academic All-Americans ==
On February 28, 1988, GTE and CoSIDA announced the 1988 Academic All-America team, with Michael Smith headlining the University Division as the first men's college basketball Academic All-American of the Year. The following is the 1987–88 GTE Academic All-America Men's Basketball Team (University Division) as selected by CoSIDA:

First Team
Player	School	Class	GPA and major
Alec Kessler	Georgia	Sophomore	3.84 Genetics
Tim Legler	La Salle	Senior	3.40 Finance/Management Information
Shon Morris	Northwestern	Senior	3.51 Human Development and Social Policy Organizational Studies
Derek Rucker	Davidson	Senior	3.30 Economics
Michael Smith	Brigham Young	Junior	3.67 Pre-Medicine/Pre-Dental

Second Team
Player	School	Class	GPA and major
Keith Balderston	Oregon	Senior	3.63 Pre-Medicine
Paul Crawford	Texas A&M	Senior	3.88 Mechanical Engineering
Jeff Harris	Illinois State	Senior	3.70 Chemistry
Bo Heiden	Bucknell	Junior	3.70 Electrical Engineering
Ray Willis	Montana State	Senior	3.45 Speech Communications

Third Team
Player	School	Class	GPA and major
Mike Butts	Bucknell	Junior	3.30 Mechanical Engineering
Scott Haffner	Evansville	Junior	3.34 Business Administration
Steve Martenet	Bowling Green	Senior	3.78 Business/Pre-Law
Peter Runge	Manhattan	Sophomore	3.80 Business
Dean Smith	Maine	Sophomore	3.92 Electrical Engineering
