= Manual of Patent Examining Procedure =

American legal guidance document

The Manual of Patent Examining Procedure (MPEP) is published by the United States Patent and Trademark Office (USPTO) for use by patent attorneys and agents and patent examiners. It describes all of the laws and regulations that must be followed in the examination of U.S. patent applications, and articulates their application to an enormous variety of different situations. The MPEP is based on Title 37 of the Code of Federal Regulations, which derives its authority from Title 35 of the United States Code, as well as on case law arising under those titles. The origins of the Manual date back to a 1920 Patent and Trademark Office Society publication known as the "Wolcott Manual". "One of the most fruitful endeavors of the [Patent and Trademark Office] Society in the area of education was the publication of the first Manual of Patent Office Procedure. The first Manual was written by two employees of the Office and was published in 1920 by the Society. This Manual, with its eight revisions, often referred to as Wolcott's Manual, was the only procedural manual available until 1949 when the Patent Office assumed the publication of the Manual of Patent Examining Procedure."

The MPEP is used extensively by patent attorneys, agents, and examiners to help make sure the proper USPTO regulations are followed. The USPTO registration examination tests knowledge of the MPEP and the underlying laws and regulations.

The MPEP is available in both PDF and HTML versions. The current version of the MPEP is the 9th Edition, which was released in March 2014. The MPEP has traditionally been available in paper form, but electronic versions are now used more often, particularly because an applicant only may consult the electronic versions while taking the USPTO registration examination, or the patent bar examination. As of March, 2014 the patent bar examination tests the 9th Edition.

The MPEP provides guidance to members of the public on how to present persuasive arguments to a patent examiner as to why a patent should be granted on a given patent application. See in particular Chapter 2100 on patentability.

== Contents ==
The MPEP comprises the following chapters:

- 0100, Secrecy, Access, National Security, and Foreign Filing
- 0200, Types, Cross-Noting, and Status of Application
- 0300, Ownership and Assignment
- 0400, Representative of Inventor or Owner
- 0500, Receipt and Handling of Mail and Papers
- 0600, Parts, Form, and Content of Application
- 0700, Examination of Applications
- 0800, Restriction in Applications Filed Under 35 U.S.C. 111; Double Patenting
- 0900, Prior Art, Classification, and Search
- 1000, Matters Decided by Various U.S. Patent and Trademark Office Officials
- 1100, Statutory Invention Registration (SIR) and Pre-Grant Publication (PG Pub)
- 1200, Appeal
- 1300, Allowance and Issue
- 1400, Correction of Patents
- 1500, Design Patents
- 1600, Plant Patents
- 1700, Miscellaneous
- 1800, Patent Cooperation Treaty
- 1900, Protest
- 2000, Duty of Disclosure
- 2100, Patentability
- 2200, Citation of Prior Art and Ex Parte Reexamination of Patents
- 2300, Interference Proceedings
- 2400, Biotechnology
- 2500, Maintenance Fees
- 2600, Optional Inter Partes Reexamination
- 2700, Patent Terms and Extensions
- 2800, Supplemental Examination
- 2900, International Design Applications
- Appendix I, Partial List of Trademarks
- Appendix II, List of Decisions Cited
- Appendix L, Patent Laws
- Appendix R, Patent Rules
- Appendix T, Patent Cooperation Treaty
- Appendix AI, Administrative Instructions Under The PCT
- Appendix P, Paris Convention
- Index, Subject Matter Index
- Chapter FPC, Form Paragraphs Consolidated

== Replications ==
Many third parties have replicated the MPEP in electronic form.

=== Commercial replications ===
Commercial replications, that is, those that require a fee/subscription service to access the MPEP include, an iPhone App called, LawStack MPEP (provides free trial), and an e-Book version provided by Thomson Reuters.

=== Non-commercial replications ===
Non-commercial replications, that is, those that are provided freely without any fees or charges, include one provided by Tysver Beck Evans LLP and a searchable replication provided by Chhabra Law. The USPTO also provides a searchable replication on its website.

== See also ==
- United States Patents Quarterly (USPQ)
- Compendium of U.S. Copyright Office Practices
- Trademark Manual of Examining Procedure (TMEP)
- Manual of Patent Office Practice (MOPOP) (Canadian patent law)
- Manual of Patent Practice, issued by the United Kingdom's Intellectual Property Office
- Guidelines for Examination in the European Patent Office
- United States Patent Classification
- Patent Application Information Retrieval (PAIR)
