= IIP =

IIP may refer to:

== Organizations ==
- Indian Inclusive Party
- Indian Institute of Packaging
- Bureau of International Information Programs
- Indian Institute of Petroleum
- International Ice Patrol
- International Institute for Peace
- Investors In People
- Irish Independence Party
- International Inventories Programme

== Science ==
- Idiopathic interstitial pneumonia
- Internet Imaging Protocol, an imaging protocol implemented on top of HTTP
- Input Intercept Point (Signal Processing): IIP2 or IIP3
- I2P, the Invisible Internet Project, an anonymous communications network
- II-p or IIp, a subtype of Type II supernova

== Other uses ==
- Interest in possession trust, a form of legal trust
- International investment position
- Index of industrial production
- Canadian Immigrant Investor Program

== See also ==
- IIPS (disambiguation)
