= National Association of Patent Practitioners =

The National Association of Patent Practitioners (NAPP) is a United States non-profit organization of patent attorneys and patent agents and those working in the patent field. The NAPP was founded in 1996. The objective claimed by the NAPP is "to foster professionalism in the patent practitioner community and to aid patent agents and patent attorneys in staying current in matters relating to practice before the USPTO".

The NAPP is reported to have called the outsourcing of prior art searches at the USPTO "another hidden tax on innovation."

The NAPP and IPO have filed objections to proposed rules relating to appeals.

== See also ==
- Intellectual property organization
