= Ove Granstrand =

Swedish academic scholar

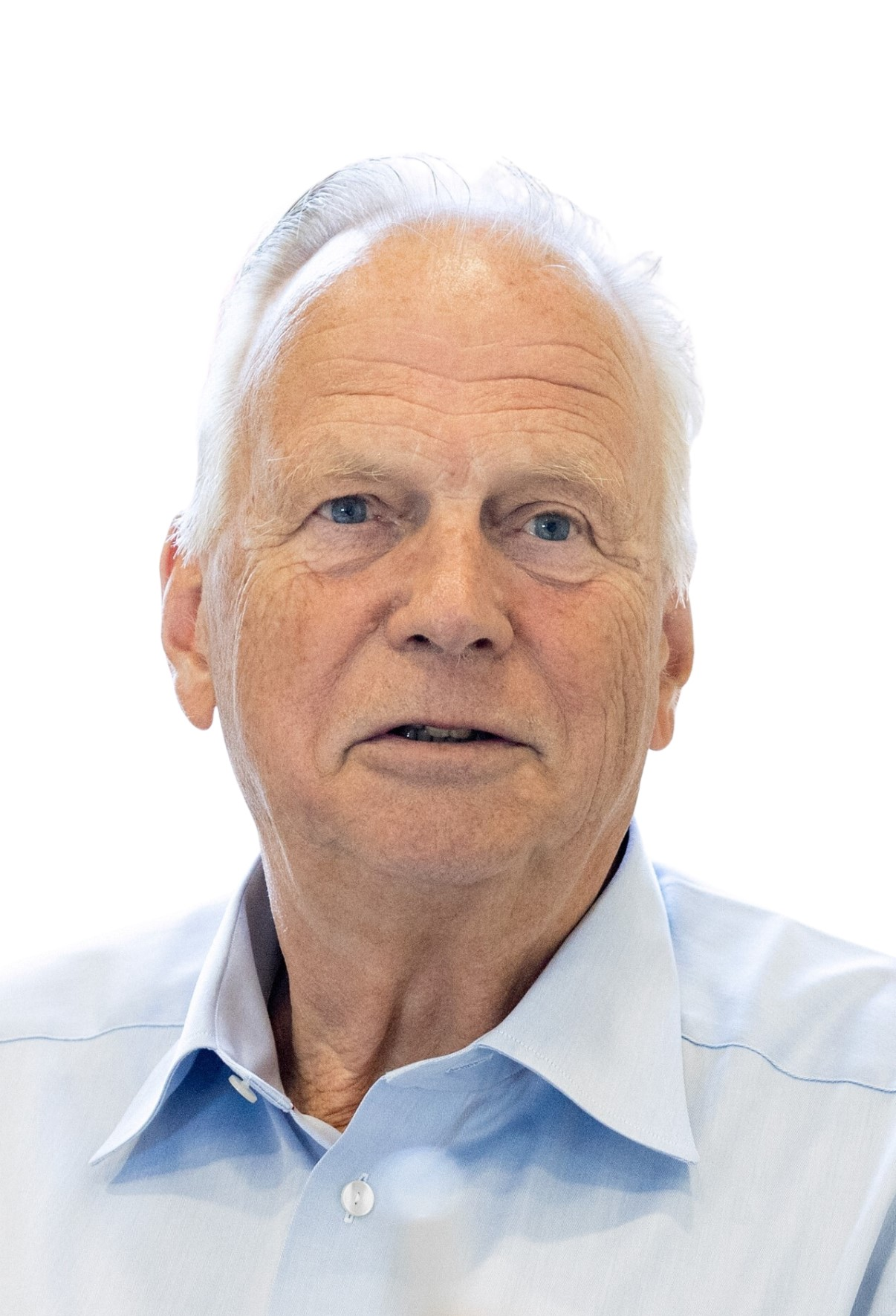
- Grandstand at the University of Cambridge

Academic background
- Education: Chalmers University of Technology, University of Gothenburg, Stanford University

Academic work
- Discipline: Economics, technology, innovation
- Sub-discipline: Intellectual Property, Licensing
- Institutions: Chalmers University of Technology, Sweden

Sven Ove Granstrand (born 11 August 1944) is a Swedish economist and management scholar known for his contributions to the field of industrial economics, particularly on technological change, innovation and intellectual property rights.

In 1986, Granstrand was appointed as Regius Professor in Industrial Management and Economics at Chalmers University of Technology. He was also the founder and chairman of the Center for Intellectual Property Studies. In 2000, he co-founded the European Institute of Technology and Innovation Management. In 1993, he was elected a member of Royal Swedish Academy of Engineering Sciences, and a lifetime fellow at Clare Hall at the University of Cambridge in 2019.

Granstrand has held many visiting professorships at various institutions including Stanford Institute for Economic Policy Research, Science Policy Research Unit, University of Sussex (1990), MIT Sloan School of Management (1985–1986), and Akademia Nauk in Moscow. In 2019, he was appointed to the Leverhulme Trust Visiting Professorship at the University of Cambridge's Institute for Manufacturing . Granstrand has also hosted international symposia in Scandinavia, such as the three Wallenberg Symposia on 'Economics of Technology' in 1991, 'Economics, Law and Intellectual property' in 2000, and 'Medicine, Technology and Economics' in 2007.

During his influential academic career Granstrand has served on many expert committees for the European Commission and on various boards in academia and industry.

== Education ==
Granstrand began his academic journey studying engineering physics but soon found his calling in economics. He received a Master of Science (M.Sc.) from Chalmers University of Technology in Mechanical Engineering in 1969 as well as an M.Sc. degree in mathematics in 1971 and an MBA from the Graduate School of Business in Göteborg in 1971. In 1972, he graduated with an M.Sc. in Operations Research from Stanford University as a PhD candidate. Returning to Sweden he received his PhD in Industrial Management and Economics from Chalmers University of Technology in 1979.

His doctoral dissertation 'Technology Management and Markets' from 1979 (published by Pinter Publ. in 1982) was one of the first worldwide in the then new field of Technology Management. Exploring R&D management and innovation in industrial organizations and the economics of technological change led him to conclude that quasi-integrated innovation systems (later termed as open innovation) was conducive to innovativeness.

As an emeritus he returned to mathematics and operations research and resumed studies for another PhD degree at the Department of Mathematical Sciences at Chalmers.

== Academic contributions and influence ==
Granstrand's research interests span a broad range of topics in economics and management of technology, innovation and IP. In particular, he has studied technology management, corporate strategy and diversification in multi-technology corporations in Europe, Japan and the US, as well as various issues related to R&D, intellectual property and intellectual capital more generally. His research is extensively based on primary data collected through dozens of large scale surveys and extensive field trips to many countries, visiting hundreds of firms, institutes and agencies and conducting well over a thousand interviews, providing deep insights in managerial behaviour beyond what is published. He has also worked with mathematical modelling and simulation and has throughout a long and diverse research career acquired experience in a broad range of research methods.

Orienting his work along the lines of thinking in Schumpeterian and evolutionary theories, Granstrand early on conceptualized and showed that quasi-integrated organizational forms for external acquisition and exploitation of new technologies (i.e. what later became termed inbound and outbound open innovation) likely was conducive to the innovativeness of industrial firms, whereby he contributed to transaction cost theory as developed by Oliver Williamson. He also conducted and supervised a number of empirical studies of various technology acquisition and exploitation strategies besides in-house R&D, such as technology licensing, external technology collaborations, acquisitions and spin-offs of technology-based firms and technology intelligence. Granstrand contributed to the theory of the firm by showing how multi-technology based firms emerge and engage in intertwined processes of technology diversification and product diversification. Granstrand contributed to the theory of patent rights and their rationales by showing how IP rights can be used as tools for innovation governance. He has also contributed to the economics of technology and innovation by developing a theoretical framework for techno-economic analysis of the dynamic and uncertain relations between technological bases, technical performance parameters, innovations and economic performance with models of compound buyer-seller diffusion, technological disruption, and an endogenizing feedback structure through investments in R&D and new technologies. He contributed to the theorizing about the formation of intellectual capital and emergence of intellectual capitalism, much driven by ICTs, lowering transaction costs and enabling intangible products, in conjunction with strengthened IPRs enabling trade in intangibles. Along the way Granstrand has also made contributions to innovation policy analysis as well as to ecosystem analysis and game theory. He has also been an esteemed educator and lecturer in technology and IP management and innovation economics throughout his academic career, having developed several new courses and new course material.

Granstrand published over 200 articles and reports and authored or edited nearly 20 books. His book "The Economics of Management of Intellectual Property– Towards Intellectual Capitalism" remains a highly cited pioneering and comprehensive work and a go-to reference even after being published more than 20 years ago. Some of his other books are:

- Evolving Properties of Intellectual Capitalism – Patents and Innovations for Growth and Welfare (Edward Elgar, 2018)
- Industrial Innovation Economics and Intellectual Property (Svenska Kulturkompaniet Publ., 2018)
- Economics, Law and Intellectual Property. (Editor), (Kluwer Academic Publ., 2003)
- The Economics and Management of Technological Diversification. Co-edited with Cantwell, J. and Gambardella, A. (Routledge, 2004)
- Bringing Technology and Innovation into the Boardroom. (Palgrave Publ., 2004) (Chapters and editorial contributions to a book co-authored with the European Institute of Technology and Innovation Management).
- Economics of Technology. (Editor) (Elsevier Science Publ., 1994)
- The Race to European Eminence: who are the coming tele-service multinationals? Elsevier Publ. Co-edited with E. Bohlin. (North-Holland Publ., 1994)
- Technology Management and International Business: Internationalization of R&D Technology, Co-edited with Håkansson, L. and Sjölander, S. (Wiley, 1992)
- Technology, Management and Markets: an investigation of R&D and innovation in industrial organizations (Pinter Publ., 1982)

== Selected papers ==
Granstrand, O. "A cooperative game theory systems approach to the value analysis of (innovation) ecosystems", Technovation, Volume 130, February 2024.

Granstrand, O. and M. Holgersson "Innovation ecosystems: A conceptual review and a new definition", Technovation, Volumes 90–91, February–March 2020.

Granstrand, O. "Towards a Theory of Innovation Governance and the Role of IPRs", GRUR International, Volume 69, Issue 4, April 2020, Pages 341–354.

Granstrand, O. "Towards a theory of the technology-based firm" Research policy 27.5 (1998): 465–489.

Granstrand, O., P. Patel, and K. Pavitt "Multi-technology corporations: why they have "distributed" rather than "distinctive core" competencies" California Management Review 39.4 (1997): 8-25.

Granstrand, O., and C. Oskarsson "Technology diversification in "MUL-TECH" corporations" IEEE Transactions on Engineering Management 41.4 (1994): 355–364.

Granstrand, O., E. Bohlin, C. Oskarsson, and N. Sjöberg "External technology acquisition in large multi‐technology corporations" R&D Management 22.2 (1992): 111–134.

Granstrand, O., and S. Sjölander "The acquisition of technology and small firms by large firms" Journal of Economic Behavior & Organization 13.3 (1990): 367–386.

Granstrand, O., and S. Sjölander "Managing innovation in multi-technology corporations" Research Policy 19.1 (1990): 35–60.
