= IP Federation =

- Abbreviation: IP Fed
- Formation: 1920
- Legal status: Company limited by guarantee in England and Wales
- Purpose: Representing views of UK industry in IPR policy and practice matters
- Location: 2nd Floor, Viaro House, 20–23 Holborn, London, England, UK EC1N 2JD
- Region served: UK, EU and international
- President: Kevin Scott
- Secretary: David England
- Main organ: IP Federation Council
- Website: www.ipfederation.com
- Formerly called: Trade Marks Patents and Designs Federation (TMPDF)

The IP Federation (formerly the "Trade Marks Patents and Designs Federation" or TMPDF) is a United Kingdom industry intellectual property trade association. It was founded in 1920 as an industry organization that provides input representing its members' interests in the United Kingdom and international intellectual property rule-making process. It celebrated its centenary on 23 April 2020.

== Legal form and name; membership and resources ==
The Federation is a company limited by guarantee in England and Wales (no 166772, incorporated on 23 April 1920 as the "Trade Marks Patents and Designs Federation"). It adopted the style "TMPDF" until 2008, and since January 2009 it has adopted that of "IP Federation". The company name was changed from "Trade Marks Patents and Designs Federation" to "IP Federation" on 5 July 2014.

In April 2018, the company limited by guarantee had 44 members. These included several FTSE-100 UK companies and subsidiaries of comparably large or larger non-UK companies as well as at least one well-known privately owned innovative company. Mainly funded by its membership subscriptions, the Federation had an income in 2017 of £163 k and reserves of £313 k.

== History ==
=== Origins ===
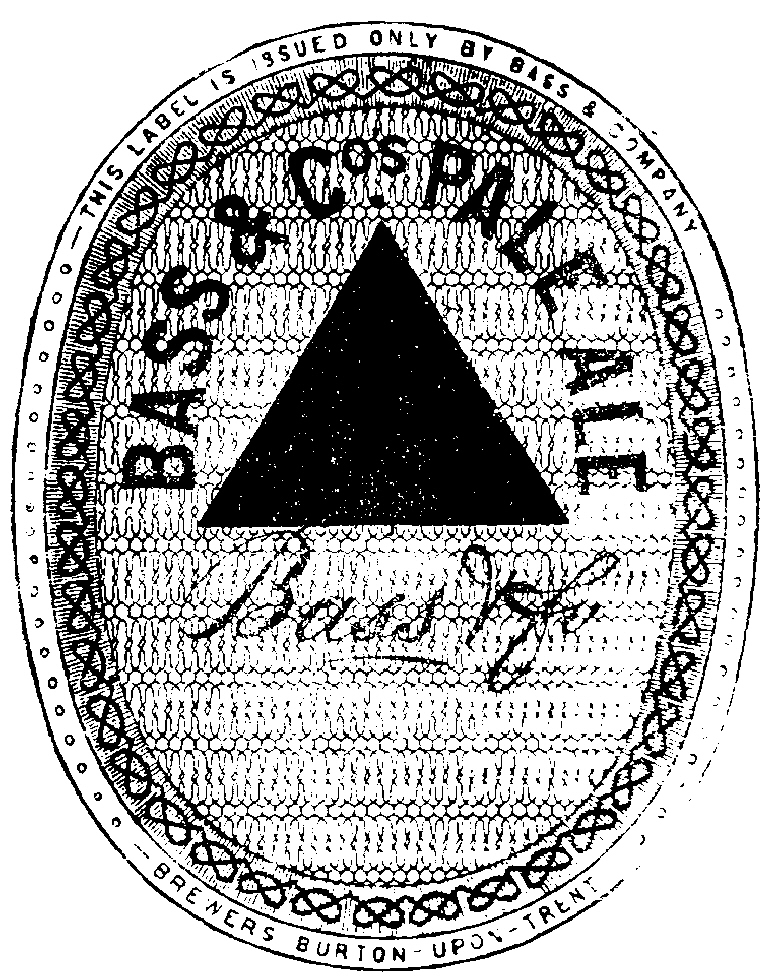
Bass Brewery's logo became the first image to be registered as a trade mark in the UK, in 1876

The Federation had its origin in a committee of industrial companies which from 1913 lobbied the UK government on its planned trademark legislation. On 23 April 1920, a limited company was incorporated to continue this work, and with a broad remit indicated by its name “Trade Marks Patents and Designs Federation Limited”. Ever since, the Federation’s “Council”, chaired by a “President”, has met approximately monthly to allow prompt lobbying about any IP matter that may arise.

The first “object” of the company listed in the Memorandum of Association emphasised the interests of traders and also internationalism: “To promote and secure mutual support and co-operation among traders in the British Empire and Foreign Countries in all matters relating to trade marks trade names patents design copyrights and other analogous rights affecting their general or common interest and to promote the interests of such traders about any of the matters aforesaid.”

The second “object” included the promotion of international “conventions” and “arrangements”, a clear reference to the benefits that had arisen from the Paris Convention of 1883 establishing priority rights and from the Berne Convention of 1886 on copyright.

=== Founder members ===
There were 13 founder subscribers to the Federation, with a bias towards the brand-centric. Several of the companies owned brands that are still in use today (with registered trade mark protection): Bass and Guinness (beer); Colman’s (mustard); Coats (cotton thread); Tootal (garments); and Lever (within the house mark Unilever). By 1924, the Federation structure included both a patents committee and a trade marks committee reporting to Council. The first President of the Federation was Gerard Arden Clay, a director of the brewing company Bass, Ratcliff & Gretton Ltd., owners of the famous “Bass” triangle mark, applied for within the first month of operation of the UK registered trade mark system (January 1876). This registration, still in force in 2020, was a pure device mark, a filled equilateral triangle.

Its member companies today are engaged in a wide range of manufacturing and service provision, of which, however, only one (Unilever) can trace itself back to a founding subscriber. Member companies are UK companies or parts of international groups with a strong UK presence.

=== Activities ===
From 1920 to August 1939, the archives show the Federation considering matters ranging from UK patent and trade mark legislation to an international proposal for trade marks and a Mexican judgement relating to Palmolive soap. In World War II, government emergency powers and IP rights of enemies and neutrals were discussed; in addition, during the war, the Federation became alarmed because strong government direction had encouraged “uninformed” anti-patent opinion that could damage the Federation’s members in the post-war period. Similar anti-patent opinions have emerged in more recent crises such as climate change and Covid-19.

Post-war, European IP matters took centre stage in Federation deliberations. The Strasbourg Convention of 1963 on patent harmonisation set out new principles for patentability, which were then adopted in the European Patent Convention (EPC) of 1973; both conventions came into force across Europe piecemeal from 1978. The Community trade mark system began operating in 1994. European competition law started seriously to affect the enforcement and licensing of IP rights, as a result of which a Licensing and Competition Laws committee was set up in 1975. From 1995, the Federation was particularly active and persistent in opposing European Commission proposals to introduce second-tier patent systems across the EU, and was gratified when these proposals were removed from the Commission “to do” list in 2005.

The Federation has employed a Secretary at least since 1932. The Secretary from 1932 to 1957, Sir William Jarratt, had previously been Comptroller-General of the UK Patent Office. He was succeeded up to 1984 by further retired senior civil servants with knighthoods and/or CBs, including another former Comptroller-General.

From 1990, instead of reporting only to members at the annual general meeting, the Council published a Review of trends and events in intellectual property. This continued as Trends and Events for several years, before being relaunched in 2020, the centenary year, as IP Federation Review.

== Governance and work ==
The policy-making body of the Federation is its Council, which meets monthly except in August. Members of the Council are mostly the heads of intellectual property of its member companies, all of which are industrial companies, not professional private practices. The Federation produces policy papers (typically 10 per year) in response to consultations by the UK government, the European Commission, the European Patent Office, and others. It lobbies using these policy papers (published on its website as well as sent to the relevant officials), and also through meetings with officials. The Federation also publishes an annual review of intellectual property with a focus on its activities in the year, Trends and Events.

Separate committees dealing with topics such as trade marks, patents and copyright meet regularly to discuss any issues of interest. Any position that the committee feels needs to be raised is passed to the Council for approval.

The Federation has a distinctive position among other representative bodies dealing with intellectual property, and was influential in resisting the extension of second-tier patent protection in Europe, in the removal of form-based competition law from the UK Patents Act, and generally in the preparations for the Unified Patent Court and the unitary patent (still awaiting sufficient ratification as of 22 March 2018). It made representations on the mechanics of Brexit and what it meant for intellectual property rights in the UK, both alone and in collaboration with organisations such as the IP Committee of the Law Society of England and Wales, the Intellectual Property Bar Association, the Chartered Institute of Patent Attorneys (CIPA) and the Chartered Institute of Trade Mark Attorneys (CITMA).

Since its inception as a trade association, its close relationship with the Confederation of British Industry (CBI) permits it to provide professional input on intellectual property matters to the CBI, as well as represent it in meetings of the European employers’ association, BusinessEurope, concerning intellectual property.

== Covid-19 ==
With Covid-19 affecting the work of legal professionals everywhere, the IP Federation remained in regular contact with the UK Intellectual Property Office (UK IPO) and presidents of other IP organisations such as the Chartered Institute of Patent Attorneys (CIPA) and the Chartered Institute of Trademark Attorneys (CITMA). Their meetings addressed matters such as the way the UK IPO is dealing with practical issues like contacting parties when there isn’t an available email address, delaying deadlines, issuing registration certificates, and clarity.

== IP Inclusive ==
The IP Federation is a founder member of IP Inclusive, a pan-professional diversity task force committed to making the IP professions more inclusive for all those who have the necessary aptitude, regardless of their age, gender, race, sexual orientation, religion, physical ability, wealth or background. Following a meeting on 27 January 2015, the Chartered Institute of Patent Attorneys (CIPA), the Chartered Institute of Trade Mark Attorneys (CITMA), the IP Federation and the UK association of the International Federation of Intellectual Property Attorneys (FICPI-UK) agreed to commit to a range of joint initiatives aimed at achieving these outcomes and improving diversity throughout the IP professions.

=== Senior leaders’ pledge ===
The in-house professionals’ version of the IP Inclusive senior leaders’ pledge was created by IP Inclusive and the IP Federation together. It is designed to allow leaders in corporate IP departments to make a visible commitment to promoting diversity and inclusion (D&I) in their teams. The underlying intention is to ensure that D&I issues are championed at the highest level.

== Presidents of the IP Federation ==
The complete list of presidents of the IP Federation (formerly the Trade Marks Patents and Designs Federation) is as follows:

1. Mr Gerard Clay (1920–1930)
2. Mr John McDowell (1930–1935)
3. Mr J. James (1935–1947)
4. Mr W. W. Wigginton (1947–1957)
5. Mr L. A. Ellwood (1957–1966)
6. Mr Fyfe Gillies (1966–1971)
7. Mr M. F. Coop (1971–1973)
8. Mr J. M. Aubrey (1973–1975)
9. Dr J. T. Tyson (1975–1977)
10. Dr H. Aspden (1977–1979)
11. Mr Ralph Walter (1979–1981)
12. Mr D. O. Lewis (1981–1983)
13. Dr J. L. Beton (1983–1985)
14. Mr Peter Orton (1985–1987)
15. Mr T. N. Gibson (1987–1989)
16. Mr D. H. Tatham (1989–1991)
17. Dr R. F. Fawcett (1991–1993)
18. Mr G. W. White (1993–1995)
19. Mr F. N. Blakemore (1995–1997)
20. Miss E. M. Cratchley (1997–1999)
21. Mr J. M. Pollaro (1999–2001)
22. Mr R. G. Broadie (2001–2003)
23. Dr Michael Jewess (2003–2005)
24. Dr Mike Barlow (2005–2007)
25. Tim Frain (2007–2008)
26. Dr Roger Burt (2008–2010)
27. James Hayles (2010–2012)
28. Dr Bobby Mukherjee (2012–2014)
29. Carol Arnold (2014–2016)
30. James Hayles (2016–2017)
31. James Horgan (2017–2018)
32. Belinda Gascoyne (2018–2019)
33. Suzanne Oliver (2019–2020)
34. Scott Roberts (2020–2021)
35. Sonia Cooper (2021–2022)
36. Matthew Hitching (2022–2023)
37. Danny Keenan (2023–2024)
38. Adrian Howes (2024–2025)
39. Sarah Vaughan (2025–2025)
40. Kevin Scott (2026–2027)

== See also ==
- Intellectual property organization
