= European Patent Institute =

The Institute of Professional Representatives before the European Patent Office, also known as European Patent Institute (epi), is a professional association of European patent attorneys and an international non-governmental public law corporation. It was founded on 21 October 1977 by the Administrative Council of the European Patent Organisation by adopting the Regulation on the establishment of an institute of professional representatives before the European Patent Office. All European patent attorneys, i.e. all persons entitled to act as professional representatives before the EPO (by virtue of either the European qualifying examination or the provisions of Article 163(7) EPC 1973), are members of the institute. As of 2026, the institute has about 14,400 members across 40 member states.

The European Patent Institute publishes a quarterly journal, the epi Information (ISSN 1434-8853).

== See also ==
- Intellectual property organization
- Intellectual Property Regulation Board (IPReg) (UK)
