= International Association for the Advancement of Teaching and Research in Intellectual Property =

The International Association for the Advancement of Teaching and Research in Intellectual Property (ATRIP) was founded in 1981. It pursues only educational and scientific objectives to contribute to the advancement of teaching and research in the field of the law of intellectual property.

== See also ==
- Intellectual property organization
- Tana Pistorius (president of ATRIP 2013–2015)
