= Ron Marchant =

Ron Marchant CB was chief executive of the UK Patent Office, now known as the UK Intellectual Property Office, until 30 March 2007, when he retired. He currently works at the World Intellectual Property Organization.

== Education ==
Ron Marchant has a BSc in Chemistry.
