= Max Besselink =

Finnish basketball player (born 2002)

No. 33 – Kataja
- Position: Small forward
- League: Korisliiga

Personal information
- Born: April 4, 2002 (age 24) Helsinki, Finland
- Listed height: 2.02 m (6 ft 8 in)
- Listed weight: 98 kg (216 lb)

Career information
- Playing career: 2018–present

Career history
- 2018–2020: Helsingin NMKY
- 2020–2021: Helsinki Seagulls
- 2020–2021: Helsingin NMKY
- 2021–2022: BC Nokia
- 2022–2023: BG Göttingen
- 2023–2024: Belfius Mons-Hainaut
- 2024–2025: BC Nokia
- 2025–present: Kataja

Max Besselink (born 4 April 2002) is a Finnish professional basketball player for Finnish Korisliiga team Kataja.

== Early life ==
Besselink was born in Helsinki, Finland, to a Canadian father and a Finnish-Swedish mother. He was raised in Vartiokylä, Helsinki. His father, Gerry Besselink, played basketball in Finland during 1989–1997, and represented Canada national team in 1986 FIBA World Championship tournament. His mother Nina Besselink (née Johansson), also a basketball player, played in Finland national team and has won two Finnish championship titles.

== Career ==
Besselink started his senior career with Helsingin NMKY in second-tier Koripallon I-divisioona in 2018. He attended the Basketball Without Borders camp in June 2019. Besselink played with Helsinki Seagulls in the first part of the 2020–21 season in top-tier Korisliiga, but in February 2021, he suddenly re-joined the second-tier team Helsingin NMKY. Later in the same year, he was supposed to join Santa Clara University, but after the summer school he decided to turn professional.

On 28 September 2021, he joined Korisliiga team BC Nokia for the season.

It was reported in May 2022 that Besselink had signed with Basketball Bundesliga team s.Oliver Würzburg, but the deal was cancelled later. Besselink had earlier played with Finland U20 at the 2022 FIBA U20B EuroBasket, and became ill of pneumonia and sinusitis in the middle of the tournament. The rehabilitation took over one-and-a-half months and eventually Würzburg announced that his services were not needed and exercised a contract buy-out. In September 2022, Besselink signed a contract with Tapiolan Honka, but soon after he exercised a transfer abroad clause in his contract, and joined Bundesliga team BG Göttingen. On 28 November 2022, Besselink recorded a season-high 10 points in a 96–95 win against ALBA Berlin. Due to injuries, he managed to play in 16 Bundesliga games, averaging 2.1 points and 0.8 rebounds in less than 10 minutes per game in total.

After a season with Göttingen, Besselink moved to Belgium and signed a three-year deal with BNXT League team Belfius Mons-Hainaut in July 2023. On 8 January 2024, he returned from an injury, and made his debut in BNXT League. Later he suffered another injury and resided in Finland while recovering.

On 18 June 2024, Besselink returned to Finland and signed with BC Nokia in Korisliiga.

== National team ==
A former youth international, Besselink has represented Finland senior national team on two occasions. Most recently he played in a 2023 FIBA World Cup qualifying win against Israel, recording 5 points, 6 rebounds and an assist in 9 minutes.

== Personal life ==
Besselink's mother tongue is Swedish. He also speaks Finnish, and English with his father. His brother Michael is also a basketball player.
