= UNION of European Practitioners in Intellectual Property =

The UNION of European Practitioners in Intellectual Property, or UNION-IP, is a European association of practitioners in the field of intellectual property. It was founded in 1961 under the name was "UNION of European Patent Attorneys".

== See also ==
- Intellectual property organization
