= Bo Heiden =

American basketball player

Bowman John Heiden (born August 7, 1967) is an American-Swedish former professional basketball player. He's the Executive Director of the Tusher Strategic Initiative for Technology Leadership and the Founding Faculty Director of the Open Innovation Labs at the Haas School of Business at the University of California, Berkeley.

== Career ==
Heiden attended Martinsburg High School in Martinsburg, West Virginia, before enrolling at Bucknell University, where he studied electrical engineering. As a member of the Bucknell Bison men's basketball team, the 6'9'' (204 cm) forward, averaged 8.7 points and 5.2 rebounds a contest during his four-year college career (1985 to 1989). As a senior, Heiden scored 11.9 points a game while pulling down 6.8 rebounds per contest. During his four years at Bucknell, Heiden had a 3-point field goal percentage of .431 (59–137) and a free throw percentage of .849 (197–232). He set a school record by hitting 39 consecutive free throws in the 1986–87 season. He received Academic All-America honors in 1987 (All-District II), 1988 (Second Team) and 1989 (Second Team).

Heiden played professionally in Sweden (KFUM Jämtland Basket, Kvarnby Basket, Plannja Basket), Belgium, Germany and Spain. While at Jämtland from 1993 to 1995, he formed a high-scoring duo with Canadian Gerry Besselink, both were later considered among the best import players in team history. Heiden scored a total of 1762 points and grabbed 569 rebounds for the Jämtland squad.

Heiden, who was granted the Swedish citizenship during his playing career, won the 1999 Swedish National Championships with Plannja. With Plannja he also participated in the European competition Saporta Cup. Prior to the 1999–2000 season, he signed with Orange Oostende of Belgium, playing in the domestic league as well as in the FIBA Korać Cup.

In the 2000–01 season, Heiden was signed by German Bundesliga outfit SSV Ratiopharm Ulm. He made seven Bundesliga appearances for Ulm and also had a short stint at Spanish second-division side Badajoz Caja Rural that season. Heiden retired from professional basketball in December 2001.

Heiden, who earned university degrees in engineering, technology management, and economics, started a career in knowledge-based business. He worked as the innovation director for the Qatar Science & Technology Park and became the co-director of the Center for Intellectual Property and program director of the interdisciplinary master’s program at the Sahlgrenska School of Innovation and Entrepreneurship in Gothenburg, Sweden.
