= International Patent Institute =

The International Patent Institute (IIB; French: Institut International des Brevets), established on 6 June 1947 in The Hague, Netherlands, was a multinational intellectual property organization founded by four European countries, namely France, Belgium, Luxembourg and the Netherlands. Its primary mission was to centralize patent searching, archiving, and resources for prior art searches for its member countries.

On 1 January 1978, the IIB was integrated into the European Patent Organisation. This merger resulted in the creation of a branch of the European Patent Office (EPO) in Rijswijk in the Netherlands, near the Hague. The Rijswijk office is one of three locations along with Munich and Berlin, where European patent applications may be filed.

== History ==
After World War II, European nations faced the challenges of rebuilding their economies, modernizing systems and fostering international collaboration. Intellectual property, particularly patents, became a key area for cooperation. The creation of the IIB was one initiative aimed at improving efficiency in patent examinations and harmonizing patent laws. By centralizing resources and sharing expertise, member countries sought to reduce cost and streamline patent searches, although different approaches to intellectual property were also being explored at the time.

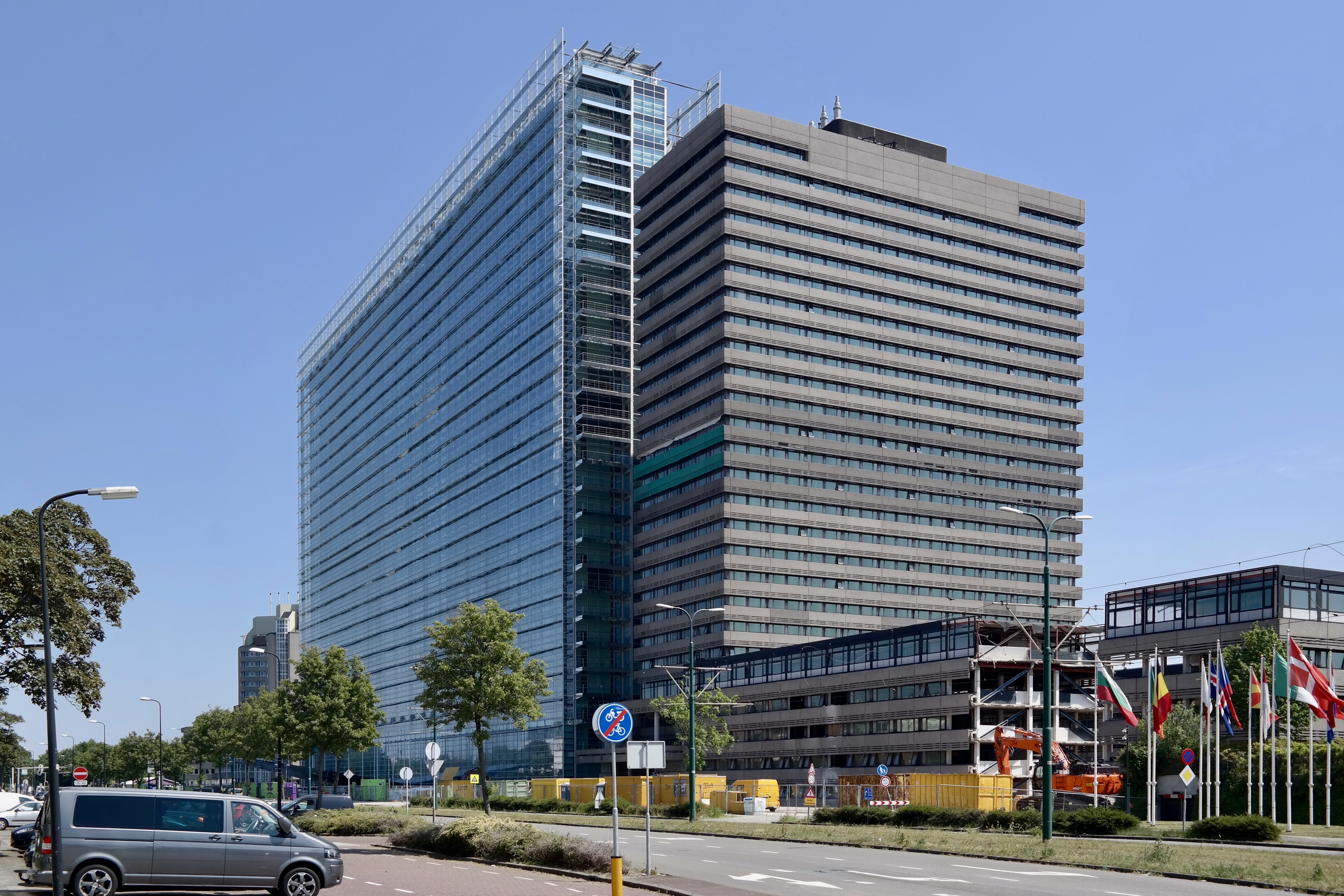
One of the current offices of the European Patent Office near The Hague, Netherlands. The International Patent institute was established in 1947, then integrated into the European Patent Organisation, and was also established near The Hague, Netherlands.

=== Key milestones and achievements ===
- 1947: The IIB was founded in The Hague, Netherlands, by France, Belgium, Luxembourg and the Netherlands.
- 1950s-1960s: The IIB developed a centralized system for conducting prior art searches, helping to streamline patent applications across its member states.
- 1964: Under the leadership of Guillaime Finniss, the IIB began laying the ground for broader European patent cooperation, eventually leading to the creation of the European Patent Organisation.
- 1978: The IIB was integrated into the European Patent Organisation marking the end of its independent operations and the beginning of a new era in European patent law.

== Member States ==
- Belgium
- France
- Luxembourg
- Monaco
- Morocco
- Netherlands
- Switzerland
- Turkey
- United Kingdom
- Germany

== See also ==
- Intellectual property organization
- Patent Cooperation Treaty (PCT)
- Strasbourg Convention (1963)
- World Intellectual Property Organization (WIPO)
- United International Bureaux for the Protection of Intellectual Property (BIRPI)
