= Tana Pistorius =

South African jurist in New Zealand

Academic background
- Education: University of Pretoria, University of South Africa

Tana Pistorius is a South African legal academic, and is a full professor at the University of Auckland, specialising in intellectual property, copyright and information technology law. She previously held the South African Research Chair in Law, Society and Technology at the University of South Africa.

== Academic career ==
Pistorius completed a Bachelor of Arts at the University of Pretoria, followed by a Bachelor of Laws at the University of South Africa. She then returned to Pretoria for a Master and a Doctor of Laws. She is a registered Attorney and Notary at the High Court of South Africa. Pistorius was appointed a professor at the University of South Africa in 2003, and held the South African Research Chair in Law, Society and Technology at that university from 2016. Pistorius joined the faculty of the University of Auckland in 2019, being appointed as professor of commercial law. In 2020 Pistorius became head of the Department of Commercial Law at Auckland. Pistorius has served as a Privacy Commissioner in South Africa.

Pistorius was the President of the International Association for the Advancement of Teaching and Research in Intellectual Property from 2013 to 2015.

Pistorius specialises in intellectual property, information technology and copyright law. She was a member of the Copyright Review Commission in South Africa in 2010/2011, which led to changes in the way some copyright is handled.

Pistorius has held a Max Plank research fellowship, and was awarded a Georg Forster Research Fellowship by the Alexander von Humboldt Foundation.

== Selected works ==
- Dana Van Der Merwe, Anneliese Roos, Wian Erlank, Sieg Eiselen, S Nel, Queen Mabeka, Tana Pistorius. Information and Communications Technology Law (3rd edition) LexisNexis South Africa ISBN 9780639014210
- Tana Pistorius, editor (30 Nov 2018). Intellectual Property Perspectives on the Regulation of New Technologies. Elgar Online. ISBN 9781786436375
- C Visser, Tana Pistorius, B Rutherford, M du Bois, R Kelbrick, Philip Sutherland, APS van der Merwe, L-A Tong, S Geyer, HB Klopper, P de W Van der Spuy. Law of Intellectual Property in South Africa. (3rd Ed) ISBN 9781776174416
- Pistorius, Tana (2006). "Copyright in the Information Age: The catch-22 of digital technology". Critical Arts. 20 (1): 47–61. doi:10.1080/02560040608557776. Wikidata Q126189505.
- Pistorius, Tana; Odirachukwu S. Mwim (2019). "The impact of digital copyright law and policy on access to knowledge and learning". Reading & Writing. 10 (1). hdl:10520/EJC-17203eae0b. Wikidata Q126189516.
- Pistorius, Tana (2004). "Click-wrap and web-wrap agreements". South African Mercantile Law Journal. 16 (4). hdl:10520/EJC54132. Wikidata Q126189546.
