= Compendium of U.S. Copyright Office Practices =

Copyright Office internal policy and procedure guide

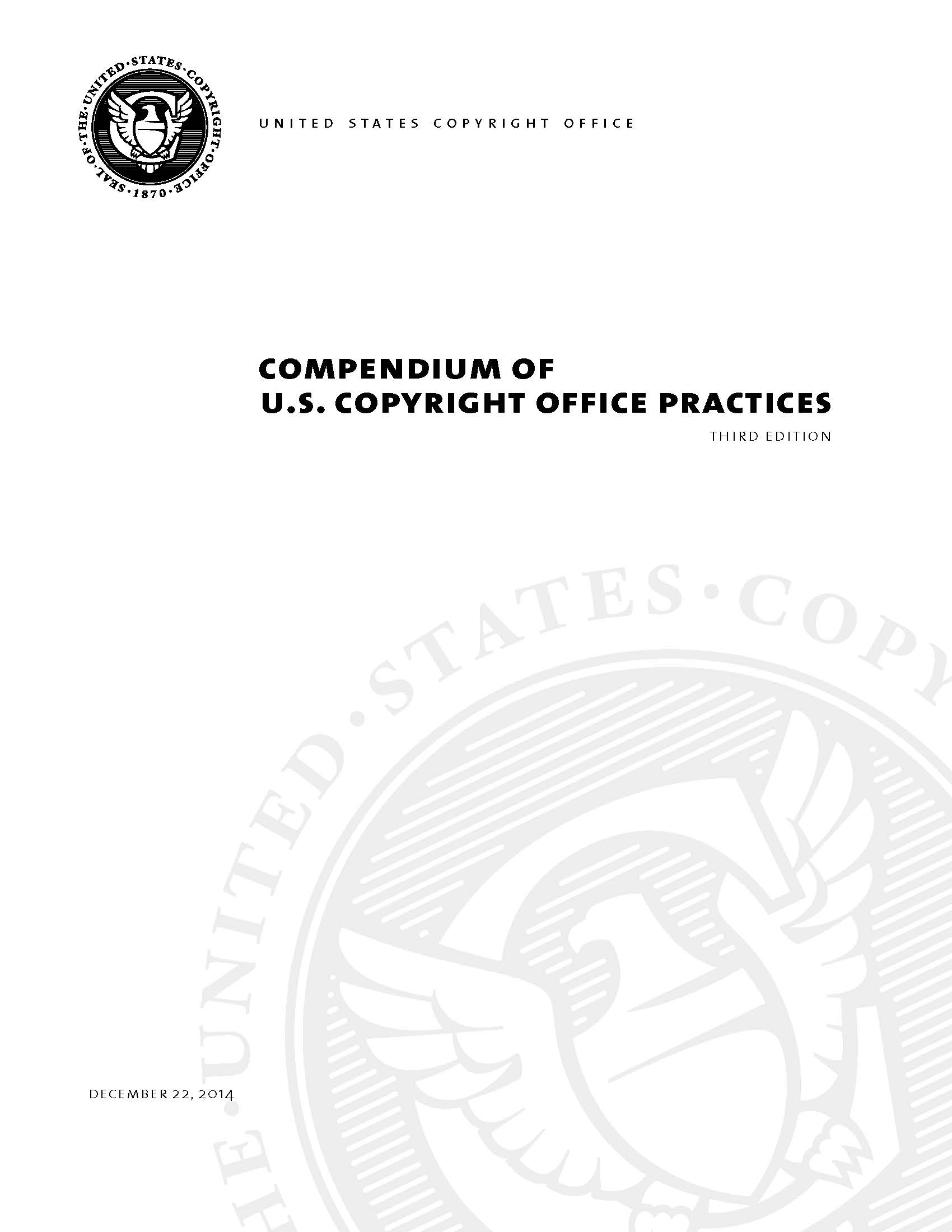
Cover of the Compendium, Third Edition

The Compendium of U.S. Copyright Office Practices is a manual produced by the United States Copyright Office, intended for use primarily by the Copyright Office staff as a general guide to policies and procedures such as registration, deposit, and recordation. It does not cover every principle of copyright law or detail every aspect of the Office's administrative practices.

The Compendium is directed to policy under the 1976 Copyright Act, as amended. It is now in its third edition, replacing the earlier "Compendium II", which in turn replaced the original Compendium that described policy under the earlier 1909 Copyright Act.

The Compendium is an internal manual, and does not have the force of law, unlike the U.S. Copyright Act or Copyright Office regulations. However, some courts have cited it as persuasive authority and given it deference based on the Copyright Office's specialized experience and broader investigations and information. For some issues that are not addressed in the statute or regulations (for example, whether to issue a registration to a government body claiming a copyright in its enacted laws), it can provide guidance as to the Copyright Office's practice.

The Compendium is sometimes, but not often, used by attorneys in dealings with the Copyright Office. A Westlaw search of the FIP-CS database, which contains documents from the U.S. Supreme Court, Courts of Appeals, District Courts, Bankruptcy Courts, Court of Federal Claims, U.S. Tax Court, Military Courts, and related federal and territorial courts, showed fewer than fifty citations of the Compendium by the courts in total. This is in contrast to, for example, the Manual of Patent Examining Procedure, which is heavily relied upon by attorneys and agents dealing with the patent functions of the United States Patent and Trademark Office.

A public draft of the third edition of the Compendium was released by the Copyright Office on August 19, 2014. The official version, entitled Compendium of U.S. Copyright Office Practices, Third Edition, was released on December 22, 2014. Proposed revisions to the Compendium were published on June 1, 2017; After a comment period, a revised version of the Compendium was published on September 29. It includes changes taking the Star Athletica, LLC v. Varsity Brands, Inc., 580 U.S. __ (2017), decision into account.

As of April 2022, the January 28, 2021 release is the most current.

== See also ==
- Manual of Patent Examining Procedure
- Trademark Manual of Examining Procedure
