= Patent engineer =

A patent engineer or patent scientist is a patent professional who is typically involved in preparing and prosecuting patent applications. The terms are usually applied to patent professionals with scientific or engineering backgrounds that do not require either attorney or patent agent qualifications, but still work with patent applications. In general, the position involves many of the technical aspects of patent prosecution, including doing background and prior art searches, preparing the description and drawings for patent applications, and giving technical expertise during invention evaluation. Positions of this nature may focus a great deal on research and development while including patent considerations, emphasizing their technical background rather than legal or patent agent qualification.

Patent scientists and engineers often pursue either patent agent qualification and/or attend law school (this applies in the U.S. but not in Europe) to become patent attorneys.

== See also ==
- Patent attorney and patent agent
- Patent examiner
- Law clerk
- New product development
