= European Patent Lawyers Association =

- Type: Bar association
- Region served: Europe
- Website: http://www.eplaw.org

The European Patent Lawyers Association (EPLAW, formerly EPLA) is a professional association of patent lawyers, with a registered office in Brussels, Belgium. Its claimed object is "the promotion of efficient and fair handling of patent litigation in Europe and the strengthening of ties between well established patent lawyers in Europe."

In a conference organized by the EPLAW in October 2005 in Venice, Italy, a panel of judges adopted a resolution calling for a single European patent court. In a second conference, called the Second Venice Forum and jointly organized by the EPLAW and the European Patent Office in 2006 in San Servolo, an island in the Venetian Lagoon, in Italy, a panel of judges approved a Resolution adopting guidelines for the Rules of Procedure of the European Patent Court to be set under the European Patent Litigation Agreement (EPLA), which has not entered into force.

Since 2001, the EPLAW also took a series of resolutions relating to European patent law.

== See also ==
- Intellectual property organization
