= IEEE Annals of the History of Computing =

Academic journal

- Discipline: History of computing
- Language: English
- Edited by: Troy Astarte

Publication details
- Former name: Annals of the History of Computing
- History: 1979–present
- Publisher: IEEE
- Frequency: Quarterly
- Impact factor: 0.7 (2022)

Standard abbreviations
- ISO 4: IEEE Ann. Hist. Comput.

Indexing
- CODEN: IAHCEX
- ISSN: 1058-6180 (print); 1934-1547 (web)
- LCCN: 92650021
- OCLC no.: 44452888

Links
- Journal homepage

The IEEE Annals of the History of Computing is a quarterly peer-reviewed academic journal published by the IEEE Computer Society. It covers the history of computing, computer science, and computer hardware. It was founded in 1979 by the American Federation of Information Processing Societies.

The journal publishes scholarly articles, interviews, "think pieces", and memoirs by computer pioneers, and news and events in the field. It was established in July 1979 as Annals of the History of Computing, with Bernard Galler as editor-in-chief. The journal became an IEEE publication in 1992, and was retitled to IEEE Annals of the History of Computing. The 2020 impact factor was 0.741. The current editor in chief is Troy Astarte at Swansea University in Wales.

== See also ==
- Technology and Culture
- Information & Culture
- Computer History Museum
- Charles Babbage Institute
