= Ian Fletcher (diplomat) =

New Zealand diplomat

Ian Raymond Fletcher (born 25 August 1959) is a New Zealand former diplomat and UK public servant.

== Early life and career ==
Fletcher was the eldest son of Ray Fletcher, the first deputy principal of the South division at BHS. He attended Burnside High School from 1972 to 1976. Fletcher then attended the University of Canterbury on a scholarship, receiving a master's degree in history. He joined the New Zealand diplomatic service, with stints in Vanuatu and Fiji, Then he transferred to the British civil service; first working in Kosovo after the wars of the late 1980s setting up a department to prevent smuggling currency from Russia to the area; and then in the Intellectual Property Office (United Kingdom). He was the comptroller (chief executive) in 2009. He chaired the G8 committee on intellectual property and concluded two agreements with China to protect the intellectual property rights of British citizens. He then transferred to the Queensland state government where he was the director-general and CEO of the Queensland Department of Employment, Economic Development and Innovation.

In his role as a Queensland government official, Fletcher facilitated the controversial approval of British multinational gas company BG Group gas to liquified natural gas development in eastern Australia. On 12 May 2010 he wrote an email to the Queensland treasurer and coordinator-general regarding BG Group's Queensland Curtis LNG project, outlining BG Group's inability to meet the legislated environmental impact assessment requirements. The email used the terms 'constitutional innovation' and a 'court of star chamber' to describe how BG Group proposed the Queensland Government could bypass the legal requirements.

== Controversy and resignation ==
Following the grant of BG Group environmental authorities for gas tenements, Fletcher departed his Queensland post and in 2012 was appointed as head of the New Zealand Government Communications Security Bureau (GCSB). for five years. However, Fletcher resigned as head of the GCSB position in January 2015. His appointment to the GCSB by New Zealand prime minister John Key caused controversy when it was revealed that Fletcher and Key had known each other professionally when Fletcher had headed the Queensland state government's trade department, and that thirty years before they were childhood acquaintances: at primary school Key had been a friend of Fletcher's younger brother (Key attended the same school as Fletcher from 1975 to 1979). Upon his resignation, he was replaced by Andrew Hampton.
