= Bernard Galler =

American mathematician (1928–2006)

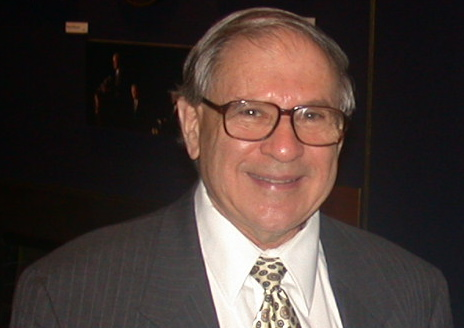
- Bernard A. Galler (2004)
- Born: October 3, 1928; Chicago, Illinois, U.S.
- Died: September 4, 2006 (aged 77); Ann Arbor, Michigan, U.S.
- Education: University of Chicago (BS, PhD); University of California, Los Angeles (MS)
- Scientific career
- Institutions: University of Michigan
- Doctoral advisor: Paul Halmos; Marshall Stone

Bernard A. Galler (October 3, 1928 – September 4, 2006) was an American mathematician and computer scientist at the University of Michigan who was involved in the development of large-scale operating systems and computer languages including the MAD programming language and the Michigan Terminal System operating system.

== Education and career ==
Galler attended the University of Chicago where he earned a BSc in mathematics at the University of Chicago (1947), followed by a MSc from UCLA and a PhD from the University of Chicago (1955), advised by Paul Halmos and Marshall Stone. He joined the mathematics department at the University of Michigan (1955) where he taught the first programming course (1956) using an IBM 704. Galler helped to develop the computer language called the Michigan Algorithm Decoder (1959-) in use at several universities. He formed the Communication Sciences dept (1965), renamed Computer Sciences (CS), which became the Computer and Communications (CCS) dept (1984), and Computer Science Department in the 70s, where he retired in 1994.

Galler's class developed the realtime course scheduling program called Computer Registration Involving Student Participation (CRISP) which allowed students to register for courses without waiting in long lines. The University used the CRISP application for over fifteen years.

From 1968 to 1970, Prof. Galler was the President of the Association for Computing Machinery (ACM). In 1994 he was inducted as a Fellow of the Association for Computing Machinery. He was the founding editor of the journal IEEE Annals of the History of Computing (1979–87). He was also the President of the Software Patent Institute (1992). For fifteen years, he served as an expert witness in numerous important legal cases around the country involving computer software issues.

== Personal life ==
Galler was married to Enid Harris, played violin in several orchestras and chamber groups, co-founded the Ypsilanti Youth Orchestra (2001) for children whose schools did not have string music education. He was president of the Orchestra Board at the University of Michigan and a member of the Ann Arbor chapter of Rotary International. He died from pulmonary embolism.

The Bernard A. Galler Fellowship Fund has been established at the University of Michigan Department of Electrical Engineering and Computer Science to "attract and support outstanding graduate students pursuing an advanced degree in computer science."
