= Intellectual Property Regulation Board =

British regulatory body

The Intellectual Property Regulation Board (IPReg) is a body regulating the patent attorney and trademark attorney professions in the United Kingdom (UK). It was set up by the Chartered Institute of Patent Attorneys (CIPA) and the Institute of Trade Mark Attorneys (ITMA).

== See also ==
- European Patent Institute (epi)
- Legal Services Act 2007
- UK Intellectual Property Office
