= Patent Information Users Group =

The Patent Information Users Group (PIUG) is a global nonprofit organization for individuals having a professional, scientific or technical interest in patent information. Its goal is to support, assist, improve and enhance the success of patent information professionals through leadership, education, communication, advocacy and networking. PIUG works to achieve its goals with training programs, conferences, and formal and informal discussion aimed at improving the retrieval, analysis, and dissemination of patent information.

== Membership ==
PIUG maintains a membership of over 700 patent professionals from 30 countries with the largest concentration of members from the United States, Europe and Japan. Typically, PIUG members are patent information researchers, patent attorneys, patent agents, licensing professionals, patent information vendors, and patent documentation experts. Many PIUG members do patent searching for corporations, law firms, and academic institutions as well as many independent patent information consultants. These members are employed in performing patentability, freedom to practice, and validity patent searches or are engaged in patent information analysis as a strategic innovation tool for Fortune 500 and multinational companies, leading universities and major IP law firms. Other PIUG members are employed in information companies, patent offices, and individual consulting practices providing services in support of patent searchers.

== Historical Development ==
PIUG was founded in the United States in 1988 by an ad hoc group of patent information scientists working in the chemical, pharmaceutical, petroleum, and technology industries. PIUG was formed "out of a need for patent information professionals to discuss issues of concern independent of vendors and publishers." Founding members wanted to develop open communication among individual patent searchers and database producers in order to supplement existing conversations generally limited to database producers and customer companies’ managers at subscriber meetings and intercompany managers conferences. It was envisioned as “a coalition of North American patent professionals whose charter is to monitor and discuss issues and developments of concern to the [patent users] community, and to work with database producers and vendors and the United States Patent and Trademark Office (USPTO) to make (or unmake) changes to benefit that community of patent users” PIUG had 17 founding members at its first meeting in 1988.

PIUG was incorporated as a nonprofit organization in the state of Michigan in 1999. The Board of Directors was established by the original bylaws of 1999; revised bylaws were approved in 2009 to remove the distinction made between "full" members and "associate" members that are employed by database producers or publishers and to deal with potential conflicts of interest. The first multiday PIUG Annual Conference was held in spring 1998, the same year that PIUG Service Awards were established. The first Northeast and Biotechnology Meetings were held in 2000 and 2007, respectively. Membership reached 400 in 2000 and expanded by 2008 to more than 700 members from over two dozen countries, many from Europe and Asia. A cooperative memorandum of understanding was signed in 2008 with the Confederacy of European Patent Information User Groups (CEPIUG). At the request of David Kappos, the Director of the USPTO, PIUG and CEPIUG endorsed development of a joint patent classification system by the USPTO and European Patent Office.
