= Gerry Besselink =

American basketball player

Gerardus John Besselink (born September 1, 1963) is a Canadian former professional basketball player.

== Career ==
A native of Kingston, Ontario, Besselink played at Regiopolis-Notre Dame Catholic High School and Kingston Collegiate and Vocational Institute. He enrolled at the University of Connecticut in 1983. He played for the UConn Huskies men's basketball team from 1984 to 1987. After 112 career games played, the 6'9'' (204 cm) center posted career game averages of 5.2 points and 5.7 rebounds. He did not miss any game while at UConn. In his senior season, Besselink posted career-highs 10.3 points and 10.7 rebounds per game. In 1986, Besselink earned a spot on the Canadian Men's National Team and participated in the World Championship in Spain.

In the professional ranks, Besselink played eight games for De Boo DAS Delft in the Netherlands in the 1987–88 season, averaging 15.6 points per contest. He returned to the US to finish his university degree in Special Education/Rehabilitation, before continuing his professional career, which he mostly spent in Finland (1989–90 and 1992–93 at FoKoPo, 1990–91 at HNMKY, 1995–96 at Korihait, 1996–97 at New Wave Helsinki, 2002–03 at Rekolan Urheilijat, 2004–05 at Visa Basket).

He also had stints in New Zealand, Luxembourg (1991–92), at Jämtland Basket in Sweden (1993-1995), at Astra Basket in Sweden (1997–98), and at German 2. Bundesliga side TSV Tröster Breitengüßbach (parts of the 1995–96 season). At Jämtland Basket, Besselink formed a duo with American Bo Heiden, which was later considered as one of the best duos in team history. Besselink won MVP honors in the Swedish league in 1994. While in Sweden, he also participated in the European competition FIBA Korać Cup.

After the conclusion of his basketball career, Besselink stayed in Finland, where he had met his wife Nina Besselink, who was a member of Finland women's national basketball team, and played at Saint Mary's College. Their children Maria, Max, Michael became basketball players. Besselink worked as a teacher and basketball coach in Finland.

He was inducted into the Kingston & District Sports Hall of Fame in 2013.
