= Institute of Patentees and Inventors =

United Kingdom-based non-profit making association

The Institute of Patentees and Inventors is a United Kingdom-based non-profit making association. It provides support to individuals on all aspects of inventing.

== See also ==
- Intellectual property organization
