= Company Names Tribunal =

United Kingdom tribunal

The Company Names Tribunal was created on 1 October 2008 in the United Kingdom and is a direct result of the coming into force of Section 69 of the Companies Act 2006. The Company Names Tribunal is administered by the UK Intellectual Property Office and only deals with complaints under Section 69 of the Companies Act 2006.

A Company Names Adjudicator has been appointed to deal with complaints to the Company Names Tribunal. The Company Names Adjudicator Rules 2008 govern the powers of the adjudicator and the processes surrounding applications for rulings on company names.

== Fundamental concepts ==
In essence any party can file a complaint to the Company Names Tribunal with regards the registration of a company name under the Companies Act whose name is the same as that associated with the complainant in which the complainant has goodwill in a business associated with the name or that the new company name is sufficiently similar to such a name and that its use in the United Kingdom would be likely to mislead by suggesting a connection between the company and the complainant.

It is not necessary for the complainant to have a company registered under the Companies Act to file a complaint, merely that they have goodwill in a company name or brand name associated with a company or trading activity.

== Opportunistic registrations ==
The Company Names Tribunal has made it clear that it will only deal with so-called 'opportunistic registrations' of company names.

The Company Names Tribunal has stated that opportunistic company name registrations share similar characteristics to opportunistic Internet domain name registrations ('cyber squatting'). An example of an opportunistic company name registration is when someone registers one or more variations of the name of a well-known company in order to get the latter company to buy the registration(s). Another example might be where someone knows that a merger is about to take place between two companies and so registers one or more variations of the name that the newly formed commercial entity is likely to require. The registration(s) would be opportunistic in that the registration holder's purpose in obtaining the registration was to cash in on the other entity's fame.

If a company name registration is not viewed as opportunistic then a complainant must file a complaint to Companies House direct, and not to the Company Names Tribunal, under Section 67 of the Companies Act 2006 alleging that the name is "too like" an existing company name registration.

== Defences to a complaint ==
The Companies Act 2006 lists the following defences to a complaint:

a) that the name was registered before the start of the activities on which the applicant relies to show it has goodwill/reputation; or

b) [repealed]

c) that the name was registered in the ordinary course of a company formation business and the company name is available for sale to the applicant on the standard terms of that business (an 'off the shelf company'); or

d) that the name was adopted in good faith; or

e) that the interests of the applicant are not adversely affected to any significant extent.

== First decision ==
The first decision of the Company Names Tribunal was issued on 3 December 2008, when the Tribunal in an uncontested application forced the change of name of the company Coke Cola Limited following an application by The Coca-Cola Company.
