= Examination for Registration to Practice in Patent Cases Before the United States Patent and Trademark Office =

Exam to become an registered patent practitioner

The Examination for Registration to Practice in Patent Cases Before the United States Patent and Trademark Office, colloquially known as patent bar or registration examination, is an examination administered by the United States Patent and Trademark Office to become an registered patent practitioner in the United States.

== Background ==
Persons who pass the registration exam and become admitted as patent agents before admission to a state bar are allowed to change registration to patent attorney upon supplying the USPTO with proof of good standing in a state or territorial bar.

== Tested subject matter ==
The examination is intended to measure the applicant's familiarity with USPTO procedures, ethics rules, federal statutes, and regulations. The applicant is allowed to use an electronic copy of the Manual of Patent Examining Procedure (MPEP) in the computer-based examination (and historically had access to a paper copy of the MPEP for the pencil-and-paper test), but is strictly prohibited from consulting any other written materials.

A large number of questions typically deal with the proper drafting and handling of a U.S. patent application or international application.

The examination is a partial open book exam in the sense that applicants have access to the MPEP and all exam answers can be found in or readily derived from the MPEP. However, the questions are difficult enough to ensure that an applicant not already thoroughly familiar with the general concepts of U.S. patent law and the structure of the MPEP will not be able to complete all questions within the allotted time.

== Structure ==
The exam is a 100-question, six-hour, multiple-choice test. The test is divided into morning and afternoon sections, each comprising fifty questions completed within a three-hour time limit.

The exam contains 10 beta questions which do not count towards the exam taker's final score, but they are not identified among the hundred. The required score to pass is 70%, or 63 correct out of the 90 graded questions. Over the past decade and a half, pass rates for the examination have ranged from 42.8% (2014) to 59.6% (2009).

Before June 2004, the USPTO registration exam was a pencil-and-paper test given at approximately 15 locations around the country. The USPTO has moved to a computer-based examination which can be taken on any business day at any of several hundred Prometric locations around the country. A sample computerized exam is available to provide a feel for how the exam is administered, but this "practice exam" contains no sample questions. Once an applicant has been approved to sit for the exam, he or she has 90 days in which to schedule an examination date with Prometric.

Past exams from 2002 and 2003 are available from the USPTO online without cost.

== Prerequisites ==
=== General ===
The USPTO requires that all those applying for registration (agents or attorneys) meet three requirements: (1) good moral character, (2) legal, scientific, and technical qualifications necessary to render valuable service, and (3) competence to advise and assist patent applicants in the presentation and prosecution of patent applications. The registration exam primarily addresses the third requirement. The second requirement is typically met with a bachelor's, master's, or doctoral degree in a recognized technical subject; the USPTO calls this "Category A" eligibility. These fields include biology, chemistry, computer science, most engineering disciplines, and physics. Two other options are available to satisfy the second requirement: having enough semester hours of specific science courses ("Category B") or passing the Fundamentals of Engineering exam ("Category C"). Note that the requirements for Category B eligibility are considerably more onerous than for Category A—not only must the candidate provide official college transcripts, he or she must supply a copy of the official course description, concurrent with the year that the course was taken, for each course used to establish eligibility for the exam.

As of January 2, 2024 the USPTO has also begun accepting applications for the design patent practitioner bar. The design patent practitioner bar accepts applicants with a bachelor’s, master’s, or doctorate degree in industrial design, product design, architecture, applied arts, graphic design, fine/studio arts, or art teacher education. Design patent practitioners are required to meet the character requirements and pass the same registration examination as all other patent practitioners, but are only permitted to practice in design patent matters and must disclose this limitation to their future clients.

Degrees in the philosophical arts (such as pure mathematics) or the social sciences (such as sociology) are not sufficient by themselves to meet the technical training requirement. However, the scientific and technical training requirement can be fulfilled by submitting proof of 40 semester hours of undergraduate courses in the above fields, 8 of which must consist of either two consecutive semesters of physics for scientists and engineers with laboratory or two consecutive semesters of general chemistry with laboratory. Consecutive means that the two courses cover one curriculum, such as physics 101 and 102. All 40 semester hours can be completed at community colleges and do not have to result in any bachelor of science degree. All of the courses must be applicable towards a degree in the subject. For example, physics with calculus would count, while physics without calculus, usually taken by other majors, would not. Other Category B qualifications allow for one without a bachelor's degree in a listed field to also demonstrate he or she has had 24 semester hours in physics for physics majors (called Option 1), 32 semester hours in chemistry, physics and biology (called Option 2) or 30 semester hours in chemistry for chemistry majors.

=== Foreigners ===
Non-U.S. citizens wishing to practice before the USPTO in their own country may also register by meeting the same requirements if the individual is registered to practice before the patent office in their country of residence AND if their country has a reciprocity agreement with the U.S. Currently, only one country, Canada, has such an agreement, although the Canadian Intellectual Property Office does not recognize this reciprocally. Moreover, the USPTO makes no effort to verify; the requirement exists merely on paper and has no force. Such registration is granted for the limited purpose of representing patent applicants from the individual's country of residence before the USPTO. Non-U.S. citizens legally residing in the United States, having a valid nonimmigrant work visa, and already employed by a patent firm in a patent prosecution role (often referred to as a "technical specialist") may take the exam in order to gain limited recognition to act as a patent agent for applications being handled through their employer. This law on Aliens, 37 C.F.R. 11.6(c), is not enforced by the USPTO Office of Enrollment and Discipline (OED). However, employees of the USPTO must be U.S. citizens and this is verified in a background check; patent agents who want to work for the USPTO must first become U.S. citizens.

== See also ==
- Admission to the bar in the United States
- Representation before the European Patent Office
