= International Association for the Protection of Intellectual Property =

- Formation: 1897
- Type: Intellectual Property Association
- Headquarters: Zurich, Switzerland
- Website: http://aippi.org/

The International Association for the Protection of Intellectual Property or AIPPI, an acronym for Association Internationale pour la Protection de la Propriété Intellectuelle in French (formerly International Association for the Protection of Industrial Property), is a non-profit international organisation (NGO). Its members are intellectual property (IP) professionals, academics, owners of intellectual property and others interested in the subject. AIPPI was established in 1897.

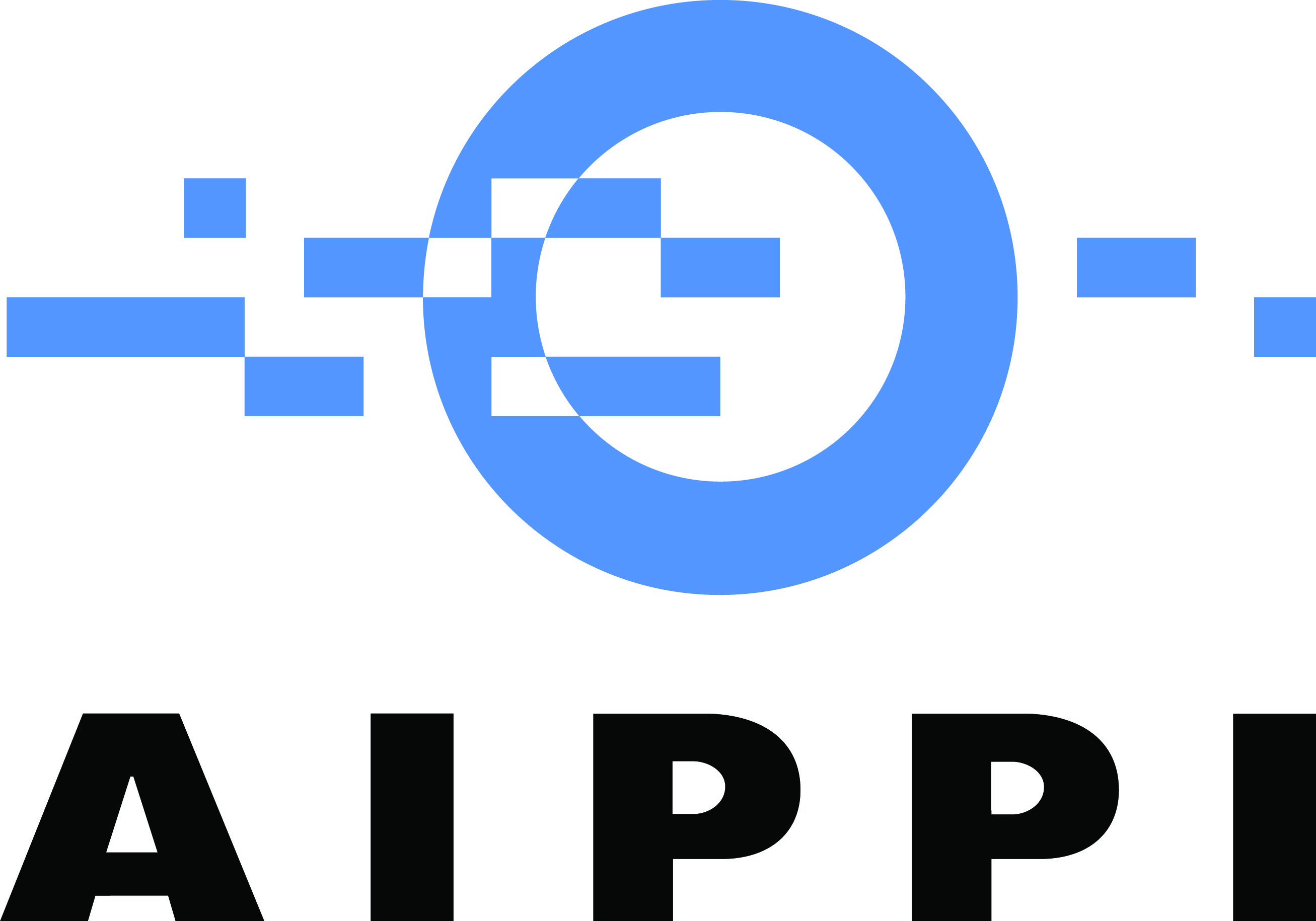
AIPPI logo PMS 2718

== Objective and composition ==
The objective of AIPPI is to improve and promote intellectual property protection. It pursues this objective by working to improve relevant agreements and laws. For example in 2019 AIPPI Secretary General Sirakova signed a memorandum of understanding with Francis Gurry of the World Intellectual Property Organization. AIPPI currently consists of 23 active Standing Committees which advise AIPPI on policy, regulatory and legal frameworks relating, to trademarks and other IP protection.

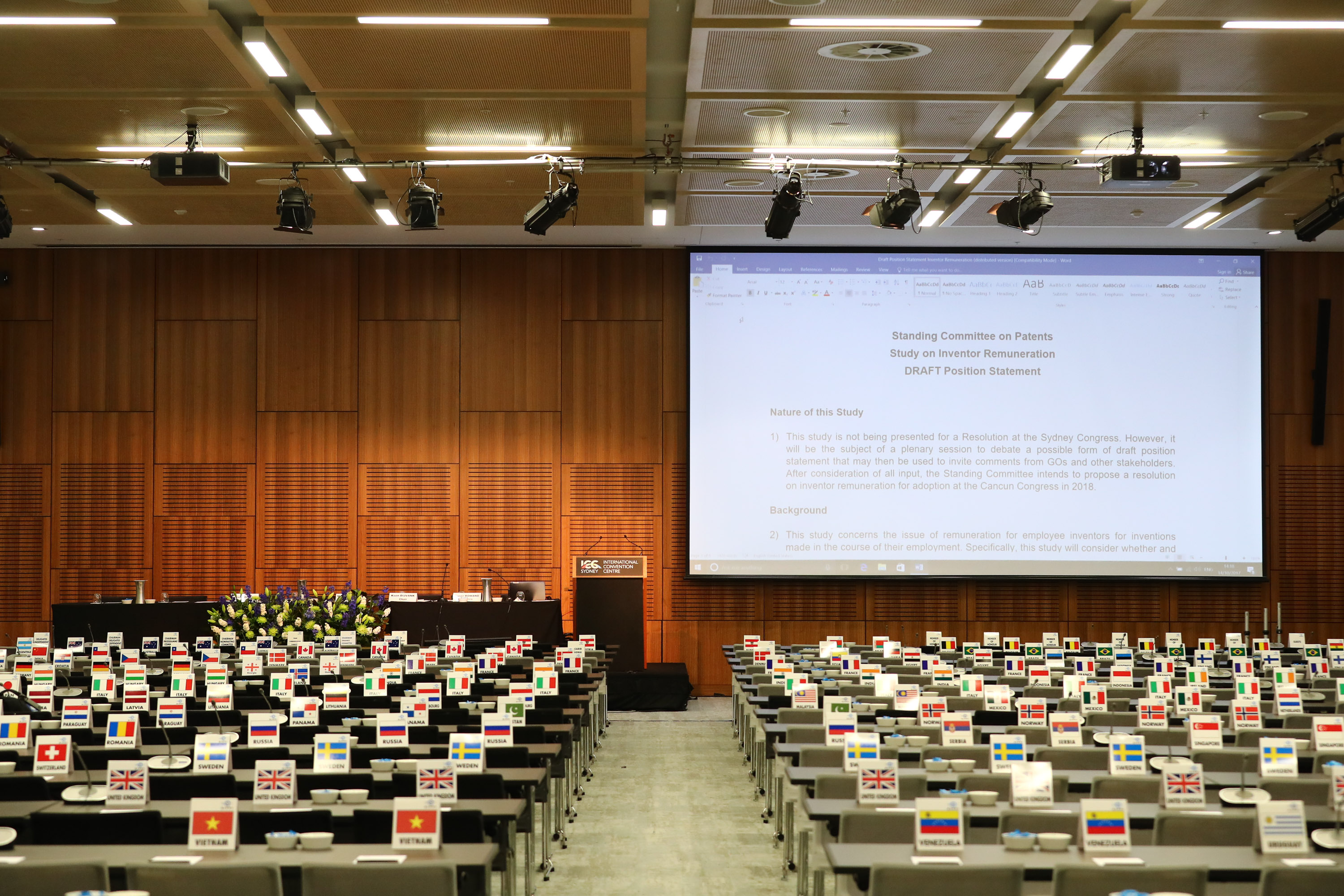
World Congress, Sydney, Australia, took place October 13–17, 2017.

AIPPI holds an annual World Congress, usually in September or October, at which members from different countries meet to discuss current issues in intellectual property law. The congress is held in different host cities; the 2026 World Congress is scheduled to take place in Hamburg, Germany, from 7 to 10 October 2026.

== See also ==
- Intellectual property organization
- American Intellectual Property Law Association (AIPLA)
- European Union Intellectual Property Office (EUIPO)
