= International Federation of Intellectual Property Attorneys =

Global professional body of patent and trademark attorneys

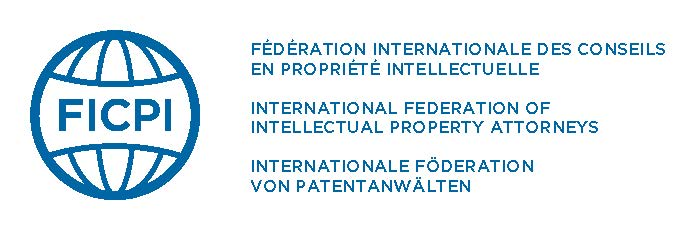

The International Federation of Intellectual Property Attorneys (French: Fédération Internationale des Conseils en Propriété Intellectuelle, FICPI; formerly known as the International Federation of Industrial Property Attorneys), is a non-political, international, professional body of intellectual property professionals, i.e., patent attorneys and trademark attorneys, in private practice (as opposed to intellectual property professionals working in the industry). FICPI was established on September 1, 1906, and is based in Basel, Switzerland.

Presidents of FICPI
...
2000 - 2003: Malcolm Royal, Australian.
2003 - 2006: Francis Ahner, French.
2006 - 2009: R. Danny Huntington, American.
2009 - 2012: Peter Huntsman, Australian.
2012 - 2015: Bastiaan Koster, South African.
2015 - 2018: Douglas N. Deeth, Canadian.
2018 - 2022: Julian Crump, British.
2022 - 2025: Roberto Pistolesi, Italian.

In October 2025, Elia Sugrañes, a trade mark attorney, was elected president of FICPI.

In 2022, FICPI and the World Intellectual Property Organization (WIPO) introduced a Patent Drafting Training Programme to enhance the knowledge and skills of professionals, such as patent agents, who wish to strengthen their patent drafting skills.

== See also ==
- Intellectual property organization
