= Software Patent Institute =

Organization

Software Patent Institute (established 1992 in Ann Arbor) is an American non-profit corporation established to assist in the correct assignment of software patent. It originally had the name University of Michigan Software Patent Institute, as it was established by the Industrial Technology Institute, represented by professor Bernard Galler. It maintains a Database of software technologies, since 1995 open to the public, covering the folklore of software industry and provides courses, the SPI reporter bulletin, and other educational materials. The institute was disputed on its arrival (in particular by League for Programming Freedom), but has nevertheless received financial support from Usenix as well as commercial software companies as Oracle Corporation, IBM, Apple Inc. and Microsoft. Its executive director is Roland J. Cole, based in Indianapolis.
