= Industrial production index =

The Industrial Production Index (IPI) is an economic indicator published by the Federal Reserve Board of the United States that measures the real production output of manufacturing, mining, and utilities. Production indices are computed mainly as fisher indexes with the weights based on annual estimates of value added. Since Fisher indexes only preserve growth information, the value in the base year (currently 2012) is arbitrarily set at 100. This index, along with other industrial indexes and construction, accounts for the bulk of the variation in national output over the duration of the business cycle.

== See also ==
- Index of industrial production (India)
