= International Intellectual Property Society =

The International Intellectual Property Society (IIPS) is an organization of intellectual property (IP) lawyers interested in learning about international IP law. IIPS meetings qualify for CLE.

Since October 12, 2009, the IIPS has held observer status at WIPO.

== See also ==
- Intellectual property organization
