= Representation before the European Patent Office =

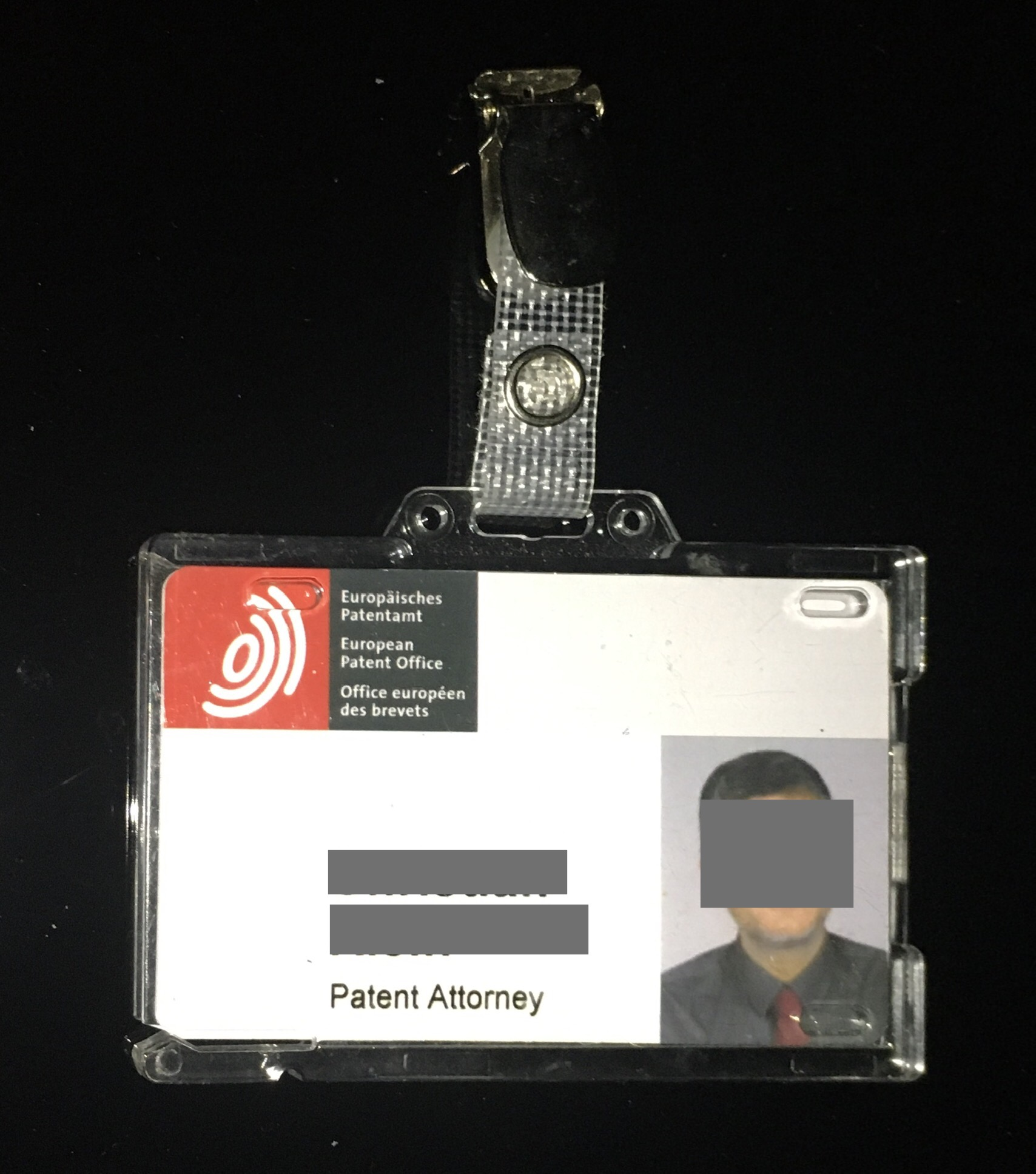
Badge of a European patent attorney with the fingerprint logo of the EPO. It serves for identifying the carrier at entry to the EPO premises and as an authorization for attending any legal proceedings in patent matters at the EPO.

The European Patent Convention (EPC), the multilateral treaty providing the legal system according to which European patents are granted, contains provisions regarding whether a natural or juristic person (i.e., a party to the proceedings) needs to be represented in proceedings before the European Patent Office (EPO).

== General rule and exceptions ==
There is no general obligation for a party to be represented by a professional representative to act in proceedings before the EPO. However, a person not having either their residence or place of business within the territory of one of the EPC Contracting States (a "non-European party") "must be represented by a professional representative and act through him in all proceedings", except for filing a European patent application. Proceedings include grant proceedings (as applicant), opposition proceedings (as patentee, opponent or intervener pursuant to Article 105 EPC), limitation and revocation proceedings (as patentee), and appeal proceedings (as appellant or respondent).

Representation of persons who must be represented and persons who need not be represented but want to be represented must be by a professional representative, or, if the party is a "European party", the representation may be by an authorised employee or by a legal practitioner. A legal practitioner representing a party before the EPO must be qualified in an EPC Contracting State, must have his place of business in that State, and must be entitled in that State to act as a professional representative in patent matters. Both authorised employees and legal practitioners "must file a signed authorisation or a reference to a general authorisation already on file". Subject to these rules, a party has the right to be represented in the manner he chose.

== Professional representatives ==
Professional representatives bear the title of European patent attorney. In order to be a European patent attorney, one must:

- be a national of one of the EPC Contracting States (the President of the EPO may grant exemptions "in special circumstances"); and
- have a place of business in one of the EPC Contracting States; and
- have passed the European qualifying examination (EQE); or

Formerly being a qualified or experienced patent attorney at the entry into force of the EPC in their state provided exemption from passing the EQEs (known as the "grandfather clause"). In December 1998, the ratio of registrations under the grandfather clause to those having passed the EQE was two to one. On 29 November 2000, this clause was removed from the EPC.

In order to sit the EQE, candidates should notably show that "they possess a university-level scientific or technical qualification." An equivalent level of scientific or technical knowledge obtained through at least ten years' experience is also considered sufficient.

=== Pre-examination ===
Starting 2012, after 2 years of related work experience, candidates can sit the pre-examination, which is a 4-hour multiple choice exam held once a year. The pre-examination assesses candidates' ability to answer legal questions and questions relating to the drafting of claims (IPREE, Rule 10). A passing grade of 70 marks out of 100 must be achieved to be permitted to write the main exam (EQE) one year later (IPREE, Rule 6).

=== European qualifying examination ===
The main European qualifying examination (EQE) is a multi-day examination, comprising four papers, for each of which there is at least one exam. Due to the introduction of the pre-examination in 2012, starting 2013, three papers of the main exam are shorter than their previous formats so that the EQE now consists of the following papers:

- Paper A (4 hours) consists in drafting claims and the introduction (field of the invention, prior art, problem to be solved and its solution) of a European patent application, on the basis of the fictitious letter by a client describing an invention and the related prior art.
- Paper B (3½ hours) consists in preparing a reply to an official communication of an Examining Division raising substantive objections to a patent application, such novelty and inventive step objections. The reply is to be prepared based on fictitious instructions from a client. The problem-and-solution approach must typically be used.
- Paper C (5½ hours) consists in drafting a notice of opposition to a European patent. The exercise is based on a fictitious letter from a client, a European patent to be opposed, several documents and an EPO opposition form. For paper C also, the problem-and-solution approach must typically be used for the inventive step assessment(s).
- Paper D (5½ hours) consists in a series of legal questions on the EPC and the Patent Cooperation Treaty (PCT); and a legal case usually requiring analyzing the legal situation of a client and proposing actions to be undertaken to cope with the situation.

The European qualifying examination is held once a year, usually at the end of February or beginning of March, simultaneously in various cities throughout Europe. In 2013 for instance, it was held in Berlin, Bern, Bristol, Helsinki, Madrid, Munich, Paris, Rome, Stockholm, Taastrup and The Hague. Dictionaries and reference material can be used during the examination "as long as they are in paper form". The use of electronic devices is however not permitted.

The marking of the Paper C of the EQE 2007, including awarding no point when candidates failed to select the "right" starting document (Note: When assessing the inventive step of claim (defining an invention in a patent or patent application), the practice at the EPO is to use the so-called "problem-solution approach", which includes a step of selecting of one piece of prior art as the closest prior art, i.e. the starting point for the inventive step assessment.) (for assessing the inventive step of some claims) and the blanket addition of 10 points to the grade of all C papers, was strongly criticized.

In 2021, the EQE was held online for the first time. A proposal to change the format of the EQE exams into a modular system, held online with some exams being available more than once a year, was discussed at a conference of the European Patent Institute on 21 June, 2021.

=== Statistics ===
As of November 2010, there were a little more than 10,000 persons on the list of professional representatives, "just less than 1500" "legal practitioners entitled to represent before the EPO", and "about 300 patent law firms, which are registered as „associations of representatives“ within the meaning of Rule 152(11) EPC". As of January 2013, there were precisely 10,427 professional representatives.

=== Association of representatives ===
Under Rule 152(11) EPC, an association of professional representatives may be formed to collectively represent a party or parties before the EPO. In such a case, the authorisation of an association of representatives is deemed to apply to any representative who practises within the association. The Legal Division of the EPO is in charge of the registration of associations. The registration is free of charge.

== Change of representation ==
The "procedure to be followed [with respect to a change of representation] is governed by Rule 152 EPC in combination with the Decision of the President of the European Patent Office dated 12 July 2007 on the filing of authorisations." "Rule 152(1) sets out that the President shall determine the cases in which an authorisation shall be filed," whereas "Rule 152(2) sets out that where a representative fails to file such an authorisation, the EPO shall invite him to do so within a period to be specified." "The Decision of the President ... states that in cases of a change of representation, and where the EPO has not been notified of the termination of the previous representative's authorisation, "the new representative must file, together with the notification of his appointment, an individual authorisation (original and one copy) or a reference to a general authorisation already on file. If he does not, he shall be requested to do so within a period to be specified by the European Patent Office."" The legal consequence of not filing an authorisation when requested to do so is that the procedural steps taken by the new representative are deemed not to have been taken. Authorisations, like priority documents, cannot be validly filed by facsimile. An original version of the authorisation has to be filed.

== See also ==
- G 4/95, a decision of the Enlarged Board of Appeal of the EPO, which deals with submissions by accompanying persons in addition to the submissions made by the professional representative appointed by the party
- Centre for International Intellectual Property Studies (CEIPI)
- USPTO registration examination
