= Index of industrial production =

Economic indicator

The Index of Industrial Production (IIP) is an index in India that reflects the growth of various economic sectors, such as mining, electricity, and manufacturing. The all-India IIP is a composite indicator that measures short-term changes in the volume of production of a selected basket of industrial products during a given period, compared with that in a chosen base period. It is compiled and published every month by the National Statistics Office (NSO), Ministry of Statistics and Programme Implementation, six weeks after the reference month ends.

The IIP provides an abstract figure, the magnitude of which indicates the status of industrial production at a given time in comparison with the reference period. Earlier, the base year was fixed at 1993–94, with that year assigned an index level of 100. The current base year is 2022-2023.

The eight core industries together account for about 40.27% of the weight of items included in the IIP. These are refinery products, electricity, steel, coal, crude oil, natural gas, cement, and fertilisers, listed in descending order of their share.

== History ==
The first official attempt to compute the Index of Industrial Production (IIP) in India was made prior to the formulation of international recommendations on the subject. The Office of the Economic Adviser, Ministry of Commerce and Industry, undertook this effort with the base year 1937, covering 15 major industries that accounted for over 90 percent of total production. The all-India IIP has been released on a monthly basis since 1950. With the establishment of the Central Statistical Organisation in 1951, the responsibility for compiling and publishing the IIP was transferred to this office.

== Successive revisions ==
As the structure of the industrial sector changed over time, it became necessary to revise the base year of the Index of Industrial Production (IIP) periodically, to capture the changing composition of industrial production and the emergence of new products and services. The United Nations Statistics Office (UNSO) recommends a quinquennial revision of the base year. After the initial series of 1937, the successive base years were 1946, 1951, 1956, 1960, 1970, 1980–81, and 1993–94.

Initially, the index covered 15 industries in three broad categories: mining, manufacturing, and electricity. When the base year was shifted to 1946 by the Economic Adviser, Ministry of Commerce and Industry, the scope was restricted to the mining and manufacturing sectors, covering 20 industries with 35 items. This series, known as the Interim Index of Industrial Production, was discontinued in April 1956 due to limitations, and was replaced with a revised series having 1951 as the base year. The 1951 series covered 88 items, broadly categorised as mining and quarrying (2), manufacturing (17), and electricity (1), compiled by the Central Statistical Organisation (CSO). The classification of items followed the International Standard Industrial Classification (ISIC) 1948.

In July 1962, the index was revised to the base year 1956, following the recommendations of a CSO working group. This series covered 201 items, classified according to the Standard Industrial and Occupational Classification of All Economic Activities published by the CSO in 1962. The next revision, with 1960 as the base year, included regular monthly series for 312 items and annual series for 436 items. Weights were assigned for 436 items, to ensure consistency between the monthly and annual indices. However, the mineral index prepared by the Indian Bureau of Mines excluded gold, salt, petroleum, and natural gas.

The subsequent revision, with 1970 as the base year, incorporated structural changes in industrial activity since 1960. Released in March 1975, it covered 352 items, classified into mining (61), manufacturing (290), and electricity (1). A working group set up in 1978, under the chairmanship of the Director General of CSO, recommended shifting the base to 1980–81, to reflect structural changes and to accommodate items from the small-scale sector.

A notable feature of the 1980–81 series was the inclusion of 18 items from the small-scale industries (SSI) sector, for which the Office of the Development Commissioner of Small-Scale Industries (DCSSI) could provide regular data. Production data from the SSI sector were included only from July 1984 onwards. For April 1981 to June 1984, data from the Directorate General of Technical Development (DGTD) for large and medium industries were used. From July 1984 onwards, combined average base year production data from both DGTD and DCSSI were utilised. The weights for these items were based on the Annual Survey of Industries (ASI) 1980–81, with no separate allocation for DGTD and DCSSI.

The 1993–94 revision expanded the index to 543 items, including 3 additional items for mining and 188 for manufacturing. This series was introduced on 27 May 1998, and the quick estimates of IIP began to be released according to the International Monetary Fund's Special Data Dissemination Standard (SDDS), with a time lag of six weeks from the reference month. These estimates were revised twice in subsequent months. To facilitate data collection, 478 manufacturing items were grouped into 285 item groups, along with one each for electricity and mining and quarrying, making a total of 287 groups. This series adopted the National Industrial Classification (NIC) 1987. Another notable feature was the inclusion of unorganised manufacturing (the same 18 SSI products) along with the organised sector, for the first time in the weighting diagram.

The next revision, with 2004–05 as the base year, comprised 682 items. According to Chief Statistician T. C. A. Anant, this revision provided a more accurate picture of industrial growth, as it was broader and included technologically advanced goods such as mobile phones and music players. The earlier base year (1993–94) had become outdated, as it still included items such as typewriters and tape recorders.

The IIP is calculated using the weighted arithmetic mean of quantity relatives, with weights allotted to various items in proportion to value added in the base year, applying Laspeyres' formula:

$I = \frac{\sum (W_{i}R_{i})}{\sum W_{i}}$

where $I$ is the index, $R_{i}$ is the production relative of the ith item for the month in question and $W_{i}$ is the weight allotted to it.

== See also ==
- Industrial production index
