= Intellectual Property Office (United Kingdom) =

Patent Office of the United Kingdom

Intellectual Property Office (UKIPO)

Executive agency overview
- Formed: 1 October 1852; 173 years ago
- Jurisdiction: United Kingdom
- Employees: 1,673 (FY2024/25)
- Annual budget: £165.5 million (FY2024/25)
- Ministers responsible: Jonathan Reynolds MP, Secretary of State for Business, Innovation, Science and Trade; Chris McDonald MP, Minister of State for Science, Innovation and Investment
- Executive agency executive: Adam Williams, Chief Executive
- Parent department: Department for Business, Innovation, Science and Trade
- Website: gov.uk/intellectual-property

The Intellectual Property Office of the United Kingdom (often referred to as the UK IPO) is, since 2 April 2007, the operating name of The Patent Office. It is the official government body responsible for intellectual property rights in the UK and is an executive agency of the Department for Business, Innovation, Science and Trade (BIST).

== Responsibilities ==
The IPO has direct administrative responsibility for examining and issuing or rejecting patents, and maintaining registers of intellectual property including patents, designs and trade marks in the UK. As in most countries, there is no statutory register of copyright and the IPO does not conduct any direct administration in copyright matters.

The IPO is led by the Comptroller-General of Patents, Designs and Trade Marks, who is also Registrar of Trade Marks, Registrar of Designs and Chief Executive of the IPO:

- c. 1989–1999 – Paul Hartnack
- 1999–2003 – Alison Brimelow (afterwards President of the European Patent Office)
- 2004–2007 – Ron Marchant
- 2007–2010 – Ian Fletcher
- 2010–2016 – John Alty
- 2017–2022 – Tim Moss
- 1 September 2022 – present – Adam Williams

=== Substantive duties ===
The existence of the Patent Office and the post of Comptroller-General are required by the Patents and Design Act 1907 (though most of the remainder of this Act has been repealed), but the substantive duties of the IPO are set out in other legislation, including:

- The Registered Designs Act 1949
- The Patents Act 1977
- The Copyright, Designs and Patents Act 1988
- The Trade Marks Act 1994

Each of these Acts of Parliament has been extensively amended since it was first passed.

=== Manual of Patent Practice ===
The Manual of Patent Practice sets out the relevant patent law and the operational practice of the Intellectual Property Office in relation to patents.

== History ==
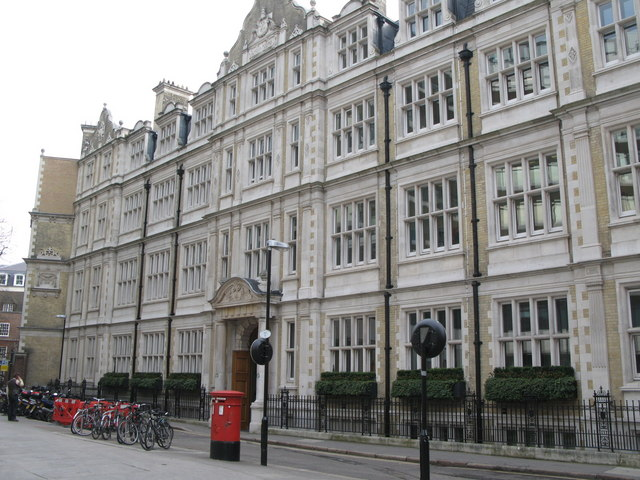
The former Patent Office headquarters in Southampton Buildings, London WC2

The forerunner of the Patent Office, the Office of the Commissioners for Patents, was established by the Patent Law Amendment Act 1852 (15 & 16 Vict. c. 83) and opened on 1 October that year. While this is claimed as the date the modern Intellectual Property Office was created it was in fact created later, along with the office of the comptroller under section 82 of the Patents, Designs, and Trade Marks Act 1883 (46 & 47 Vict. c. 57).

There had been a Patent Bill Office, under the control of the Attorney General, which was part of the old patent system. It had been located in Lincoln's Inn.

Significantly, the process of applying for a patent was extremely complicated and largely set up to ensure fees were paid to various officials (patent fees formed a significant part of the stipend of the Attorney and Solicitor General). The Patent Law Amendment Act 1852 brought the process of patent grant into a single office serving the whole of the United Kingdom (where previously a petitioner had had to apply and pay fees to several offices, and to obtain separate patents for each of the UK's constituent nations).

Initially, people applying for a patent often used to submit a detailed model of their submission; these were retained and the collection became known as the Patent Museum (opened to the public in 1863 in South Kensington, it went on to become a core collection of the new Science Museum there).

== Location ==
From its early days, the Patent Office was based in the Chancery Lane area of London, where it eventually spread to fill the area between Furnival Street and Southampton Buildings. The principal entrance was at 25 Southampton Buildings, where a purpose-built headquarters was constructed in 1899–1902 (architect: Sir John Taylor). The principal interior space was the Library, a "harsh but spectacular space 140ft long, lit from skylights and a clerestory, with two tiers of steel-framed, fireproofed galleries on cast iron Corinthian columns". Designed to allow members of the public to consult patent records, it also contained a very extensive collection of technical and scientific publications, which in 1967 was transferred to the British Library.

In 1991, having outgrown its original premises, the Patent Office moved to Newport, South East Wales, where the IPO headquarters remains to this day. A small branch office in London has been maintained for the benefit of the large professional community based there and for communication with central government.

== See also ==
- Copyright law of the United Kingdom
- Departments of the United Kingdom Government
- Chartered Institute of Patent Attorneys (CIPA)
- Institute of Trade Mark Attorneys (ITMA)
- Intellectual Property Regulation Board (IPReg)
- IP Federation (formerly the "Trade Marks, Patents and Designs Federation" or TMPDF)
- Intellectual Property Enterprise Court (IPEC)
- Patent office
- Software patents under United Kingdom patent law
- Company Names Tribunal
- Police Intellectual Property Crime Unit (PIPCU) – Funded by the Intellectual Property Office
