= Center for Intellectual Property Studies =

The Center for Intellectual Property Studies (CIP) is a development center at the intersection of industry and academia. Founded in a joint effort between Chalmers University of Technology and School of Business, Economics, and Law at the University of Gothenburg, both in Gothenburg, Sweden, CIP is an actor in the area of intellectual property and entrepreneurship.

== See also ==
- Intellectual property organization
