= Patent attorney =

Lawyer specializing in intellectual property

A patent attorney is an attorney who has the specialized qualifications necessary for representing clients in obtaining patents and acting in all matters and procedures relating to patent law and practice, such as filing patent applications and oppositions to granted patents.

== Terminology ==
The term "patent attorney" is used differently in different countries and thus may or may not require the same legal qualifications as a general legal practitioner.

The titles patent agent and patent lawyer are also used in some jurisdictions. In some jurisdictions, the terms are interchangeable; in others, the latter is used only if the person is qualified as a lawyer.

The World Intellectual Property Organization (WIPO) and the International Federation of Intellectual Property Attorneys (FICPI) propose since 2022 a Patent Drafting Training Program to enhance the knowledge and skills of professionals, such as patent agents, who wish to strengthen their patent drafting skills.

== Role ==
A study analyzing patent examination decisions at major patent offices shows that patent attorney firms play a crucial role in the prosecution process, especially in less codified and rapidly changing technology areas such as ICT.

== Qualification regimes ==
In Europe, requirements for practising as patent attorney before national patent offices should be distinguished from those needed for practising before the European Patent Office (EPO) or the Eurasian Patent Office (EAPO). On the national level, the requirements are not harmonized.

=== Australia ===
Registration as a patent attorney in Australia and New Zealand is administered by the Trans-Tasman IP Attorneys Board (the Board).

To apply to become a Trans-Tasman patent attorney, one must:

1. pass the nine topics set out in Schedule 5 to the Patent Regulations 1991.
2. hold a suitable tertiary educational qualification in a field of technology that contains potentially patentable subject matter.
3. be a resident in Australia or New Zealand
4. have been employed in a position or positions, for at least 2 continuous years or a total of 2 years within 5 continuous years, that provide the applicant experience in the following skills:
  1. searching patent records;
  2. preparation filing and prosecution of patent applications in Australia and with other countries;
  3. drafting of patent specifications;
  4. and provision of advice on interpretation, infringement and validity.
5. be of good fame, integrity or character, and not have been convicted within the past five years of offences against Patents, Trade Marks and Designs legislation.

Until the late 1990s, topics were mainly taught and examined by members of the patent attorney profession under the oversight of the PSB, but this process has now been brought into the university system within Australia.

Once registered, a Patent and Trademark Attorney may be elected as a Fellow of the Institute of Patent and Trade Mark Attorneys of Australia.

=== Canada ===
To become a registered patent agent in Canada one must complete a series of four qualifying exams over four days. As of May 1, 2014, a patent agent trainee can sit the exams if the trainee is a resident in Canada and has worked in Canada in the area of Canadian patent law and practice, including the preparation and prosecution of applications, for a period of at least 24 months. Up to 12 months of practical experience will also be recognized for those entitled to practice before the patent office of another country. One may also qualify to sit for the exams if the individual is a resident of Canada and has been employed for at least 24 months on the examining staff at the Canadian patent office.

Each of the four exams (also referred to individually as Paper A, B, C, and D) is four hours in length. Paper A relates to the drafting of a patent application. Paper B relates to the validity of a patent. Paper C relates to the preparation of a response to an Official Action. Paper D relates to the infringement of a patent. Unlike the US system, the Canadian examination format is paper based with a variety of essay-type and short answer questions and is offered at least once a year, typically in April. Results are typically known within 5 months.

With a first-time passing rate near 1% and an overall passing rate of 7% in 2012 and trending downwards, the exam is notoriously challenging and most applicants attempt the exam over several years. To pass, candidates must score a minimum of 50 out of 100 on each paper, with a minimum aggregate mark of 240 on all four papers. Recent amendments to the pass requirements enable candidates to carry forward marks for a paper (if greater than 60 out of 100) if the minimum aggregate mark is not achieved or if the candidate failed one of the papers.

Review courses are held each summer and fall by IPIC (Intellectual Property Institute of Canada). The summer course tends to be more general in scope than the fall course, where drafting practice examinations is emphasised.

Once certified, a registered patent agent is given powers under the Canadian Patent Act to represent applicants applying to the Canadian Intellectual Property Office to obtain patent protection.

=== European Patent Organisation ===
The task of the European Patent Office (EPO), which is the main organ of the European Patent Organisation, is to grant European patents (and also to hear and determine third-party challenges to the validity of European patents, in opposition proceedings). The EPO exists by virtue of the European Patent Convention (EPC), and is not legally bound to the European Union.

To legally represent clients (generally patent applicants, proprietors and opponents) before the EPO, a patent attorney must first be registered to act in that capacity as a professional representative. To be registered, an individual must qualify as a European patent attorney and, to that end, must pass a written examination, the European Qualifying Examination (EQE). The EQE consists of four papers sat over four days, each day lasting between 3 hours and six and a half hours. Those who enroll for the examination must have an engineering or scientific degree (though long experience in a scientific domain can be sufficient under certain limited conditions), and the candidate must also have practised under supervision for at least 36 months in the domain of national or European patent law.

The EPC sets out the circumstances under which an applicant for a European patent must be represented by a professional representative in proceedings before the EPO. Typically, a representative is required if the patent applicant (or all of them if more than one) does not have a place of business in an EPC contracting state.

=== France ===
In France, the practionners working in private practice in the field of industrial property are designated as conseils en propriété industrielle (industrial property counsel) or "CPI". They advise and represent third parties before the French Industrial Property Office (Institut national de la propriété industrielle or INPI). In English, they are designated as patent attorneys. Attorneys at law may also represent third parties before this office.

These practionners may be specialized in trademarks and designs, in which case they are lawyers, or in patents of invention, in which case they have a scientific or technical background.

The profession of conseil en propriété industrielle, as well as the use of this professional title, is regulated by Book IV of the legislative part of the French Intellectual Property Code.

The professional title conseil en propriété industrielle is required for representing third parties before the INPI in matters relating to patents, trademarks, and designs, although representation before the INPI may nevertheless be carried out through other means provided by law, notably through a lawyer or a company contractually linked to the applicant.

All CPIs are members of the Compagnie nationale des conseils en propriété industrielle (CNCPI), the French National Institute of Patent and Trademark Attorneys, the national regulatory professional organization for the profession. The CNCPI is a legal entity established by law to represent CPIs before government authorities, defend their professional interests, ensure compliance with professional ethical rules, and promote awareness of the profession.

There are currently more than 1,120 CPIs throughout France. The CNCPI and the INPI each maintain an up-to-date directoryof industrial property attorneys and their firms. These lists are freely accessible online.

CPIs specialized in trademarks and designs are also representatives before the European Union Intellectual Property Office. CPIs specialized in patents of invention are most often also representatives before the European Patent Office and frequently also representatives before the Unified Patent Court.

==== Access to the profession ====
Registration on the list of CPIs maintained by the INPI is mandatory in order to practise as a CPI. In summary, registration requires an appropriate technical, scientific or legal qualification and a sufficient level of academic qualification in industrial property. In addition, applicants must successfully pass a qualifying examination or meet the conditions for access to the profession through the procedure known as validation of prior learning and experience (VAE).

CPIs must act in accordance with the professional ethics of the profession. They must also fulfil their periodic obligations regarding continuing professional education.

==== Professional ethics of industrial property attorneys ====
CPIs comply with strict professional ethical rules. These rules derive from the provisions of the French Intellectual Property Code concerning the profession and from the CNCPI internal regulations. The latter, approved by an order of 8 March 2025 in its latest version, is available on the CNCPI website and on the INPI website.

The main rules concern:

- independence,
- professional secrecy,
- confidentiality of professional communications,
- prevention and management of conflicts of interest,
- loyalty towards the client,
- competence and maintenance of knowledge,
- obligations concerning integrity ("Probité (Honnêteté)"), honour and propriety,
- absence of professional incompatibilities,
- advertising and professional communications,
- case management and document retention,
- relations with other CPIs and other legal professionals,
- transparency regarding fees and billing,
- professional liability and insurance, and
- compliance with legal and regulatory obligations.

Breaches of professional ethics may be sanctioned by a disciplinary chamber provided for by the aforementioned Code and chaired by a professional judge. Sanctions may consist of a warning, a reprimand, or temporary or permanent removal from the list of CPIs.

=== Germany ===
In Germany, only Patentanwälte/patent attorneys (or Rechtsanwälte/attorneys-at-Law, who are per se entitled to represent clients in all fields of law) are entitled to represent clients from abroad before the German Patent and Trade Mark Office (DPMA). German patent attorneys have done their university degrees in engineering or natural sciences and practised in industry before being accepted for an additional three years' education, i. e. completing legal training of 26 month with an established German patent attorney, at the same time studies of German Law and afterwards a training in intellectual property and an examination at the DPMA. They are further entitled to represent their clients before the German federal court of patents (and trademarks) and in patent cases (nullity) before the German Supreme Court.

=== Hong Kong ===
In Hong Kong, there is no regulation on the profession of patent attorneys or agents. The main reason is that Hong Kong does not have a standard patent (20 years) original grant system. Hong Kong recognizes standard patents or patents for invention registered and granted in the People's Republic of China, European Patent Office (designated UK), or United Kingdom. These patents can be re-registered in Hong Kong without examination within a prescribed period. On October 4, 2011, the Hong Kong SAR Government published a Consultation Paper on Review of the Patent System in Hong Kong.

=== India ===
In India, a person registered to practice before Indian Patent Office is called a "Registered Patent Agent" or simply "Patent agent". The Indian Patent Law specifically does not mention the designation of "Patent Attorney". Therefore, there are different roles for patent attorney and patent agent in India.

Indian Patent Office conducts a qualifying examination for patent agent registration yearly (earlier, it was twice a year). Indian Patent Law mandates a science or technical degree for person(s) to appear for the qualifying examination. Other criteria for eligibility include being an Indian Citizen, and 21 years of age. There are approximately 2000 registered patent agents in India as of April 1, 2010.

However, a decision on March 15, 2013, by the Madras High Court (Single Judge), stated that advocates, by possessing a law degree from a recognized university, have a right to file, appear and undertake all responsibilities of a patent agent. The single judge rejected the contention that to appear before the Patent Office, advocates required additional specific science/technical qualification such as B.Tech. in Information Technology etc. According to this judgement, Advocates having degree in Engineering and Science are "Registered Patent Attorney" in India.

=== Ireland ===
Under Section 107 of Ireland's Patents Act, 1992 entry in the Register of Patent Agents requires that the applicant resides and has a place in a member state of the European Union and possesses the prescribed educational and professional qualifications, which are:

- Leaving Certificate or equivalent: a C grade in at least two higher level subjects (or ordinary level B grade) and a D grade in at least three other subjects
- First-year university (or equivalent) education in engineering, chemistry, or physics
- Employment for at least 3 years in the office of a registered patent agent in an EU member state
- Success at the following examinations:
  - Irish law and practice of patents (set by Irish Patents Office)
  - Drafting of patent specifications (set by United Kingdom's JEB, Advanced Paper P3)
  - Amendment of patent specifications (set by United Kingdom's JEB, Advanced Paper P4)
  - Infringement and validity (set by United Kingdom's JEB, Advanced Paper P6)

As in the UK (see below), exemptions from the Drafting and Amendment papers can be obtained if the equivalent papers in the European Qualifying Examination have been passed.

=== Japan ===
Patent specialists in Japan are known as benrishi and must take a qualifying exam to receive the title. Benrishi are allowed to practice a variety of intellectual property law (patent, trademark, copyright, unfair competition and trade secret) and are given the power to represent clients in litigation and arbitration within the area specified by Patent Attorney Law in Japan. Barristers (bengoshi) are also qualified to work as patent attorneys in Article 3 of Practicing Attorney Law in Japan. A patent attorney shall automatically be admitted to the Japan Patent Attorneys Association (Patent Attorney Act Art. 60).

=== New Zealand ===
To become registered as a Patent Attorney in New Zealand, one must:

1. be a New Zealand citizen, Commonwealth citizen (British subject) or a citizen of the Republic of Ireland.
2. be aged 21 (twenty one) years of age or over.
3. have passed the New Zealand Patent Attorney Examinations.
4. be of good character.
5. have been employed for a period(s) of at least three years by a Patent Attorney in New Zealand, The Patent Office, or in a form of employment that offers substantially similar practical experience - see section 100 of the Patents Act 1953:

Registration as a Patent Attorney may then lead to election as a Fellow in the New Zealand Institute of Patent Attorneys.

Moreover, Australian Patent Attorneys are able to obtain registration to become New Zealand Patent Attorneys, and vice versa, as a result of a trans Tasman agreement between the two countries. Consequently, a large number of Australian Patent Attorneys are also New Zealand Patent Attorneys.

=== Russia ===
To become registered as a patent attorney in Russia, one must:

1. be a Russian citizen,
2. be a permanent resident in Russia,
3. be aged 18 years of age or over,
4. to have a higher education degree,
5. to have not less than 4 years of an experience in the particular sphere (see below),
6. to pass a qualification exam.

There are some specializations of patent attorneys:

1. inventions and utility models,
2. industrial designs,
3. trademarks and service marks,
4. names of places of origin of goods,
5. computer programs, database, integrated circuits topologies.

The qualification exam shall be held on each of above-mentioned specializations separately.

After successful passing the qualification exam a person is included in the register of patent attorneys which is maintained by the Federal Service for Intellectual Property. After that, the Federal Service for Intellectual Property issues a certificate of patent attorney to a person who passed the exam; certificate indicates the specialization of patent attorney.

A patent attorney carry out their professional activity throughout Russia individually or as employee of patent bureau. A patent attorney can not be government official, municipal official, notary, judge, elected official. A patent attorney may combine his status with the status of an advocate.

As of the beginning of the 2019, there were 2001 patent attorneys in Russia. Most of them are located in Moscow (1194) and Saint Petersburg (298). Patent attorneys are entirely absent from 23 regions of Russia.

=== Singapore ===
To become registered as a Patent Agent in Singapore, one must:

1. be a resident in Singapore;
2. hold a university degree or equivalent qualification approved by the Registrar;
3. have passed the Graduate Certificate in IP Law Course jointly offered by the IP Academy, Singapore and the Faculty of Law, National University of Singapore.;
4. have passed the 4 patent examinations; and
5. has completed internship in patent agency work under the supervision of a registered patent agent, or an individual registered as a patent agent or its equivalent in a country or territory, or by a patent office, specified in the Fourth Schedule, for a continuous period of at least 12 months; or a total period of at least 12 months within a continuous period of 24 months.

Once registered, a Patent Agent may then be elected as an ordinary member of the Association of Patent Attorneys of Singapore.

=== South Africa ===
Patent attorneys in South Africa are qualified attorneys – see Attorneys in South Africa – who have additionally specialised through the South African Institute of Intellectual Property Law. This requires:

1. a technical or scientific diploma or degree from a university or technikon, involving at least a three-year course of study;
2. six months' practical training in the office of a registered practicing patent attorney;
3. sitting the Patent Board Examination.

=== Taiwan ===
Taiwan is a technology-intensive industrialized developed country, and receives more than 80,000 patent applications a year (2006~2008). However, for political reasons, Taiwan is not a member state of the World Intellectual Property Organization (WIPO). To become a registered patent attorney in Taiwan, one must pass the Patent Attorney's Examination administered by the Examination Yuan, complete the required pre-practice training course (60 hours) with Taiwan Intellectual Property Office, and join the Taiwan Patent Attorney's Association.

1. The Examination. Nationals of the Republic of China(Taiwan), who are graduates in science, engineering, medicine, agriculture, life sciences, intellectual property rights, design, law or information management of public or accredited private colleges or higher institutions, or of an overseas institution of equivalent grade that complies with Ministry of Education criteria, and who hold certificates to this effect, are eligible to apply to take the examination for patent attorneys. Foreign nationals, who possess the same qualifications are eligible to apply to take this examination. The following subjects are given in the Examination (each subject is worth 100 points and an average of 60 points is required to attain a passing grade):
  1. the Patent Act;
  2. the Administrative Procedure Act and Administrative Enforcement Act;
  3. Standards for Patent Review and Patent Applications and Practice;
  4. Calculus, General Physics and General Chemistry;
  5. Professional English or Professional Japanese (to be chosen at the discretion of the candidate);
  6. One of: Engineering Dynamics, Biotechnology, Electronics, Physical Chemistry, Basic Design or Computer Architecture (to be chosen at the discretion of the candidate).
2. Pre-Practice Training. The training is held annually or biannually. It consists of 57 hours of course work and 3 hours of examination.
3. Taiwan Patent Attorney's Association. Established on December 11, 2009, and registered with the Ministry of Internal Affairs on December 30, 2009.

=== Ukraine ===
To become a patent attorney in Ukraine, one must:

1. be a citizen of Ukraine;
2. to have a higher degree, and a higher degree in the IP protection sphere;
3. to have not less than 5 years of an experience in the IP protection sphere;
4. to pass a qualification examinations, attestation and to receive a certificate on a right to act as a patent attorney;

Currently in Ukraine there are above 300 registered patent attorneys (data on September 10, 2012). Their legal status is regulated by the Cabinet of Ministers of Ukraine Enactment "On affirmation of the Provision about the representatives in the sphere of intellectual property (patent attorneys)" No. 545 on September 10, 1994. Examination and registration of patent attorneys are conducted by the State Intellectual Property Service of Ukraine.

=== United Kingdom ===
Any person can act at the UK Patent Office, but the titles "Patent Agent", "Patent Attorney" and "Registered Patent Attorney" (which is synonymous with "Registered Patent Agent") are reserved for those duly qualified. The title "Patent Attorney" may also be used by solicitors provided that they have specialist expertise in patents, whereas the term "Patent Agent" relates to persons who have passed the relevant specialized examinations.

Qualification is achieved by passing the PEB patent foundation level papers (or gaining an exemption by passing certain university courses such as that organised by Queen Mary University in London) and then the PEB patent advanced level papers.

The PEB patent foundation papers are FC1 (formerly P1) – UK Patent Law and Procedures, FC2 (formerly "Law") – Basic English Law, FC3 (formerly P5) – International Patent Law, FC4 (formerly "D&C") – Designs & Copyright, FC5 (formerly P7) – Trade Mark Law.

The PEB patent advanced papers are FD1 (formerly P2) – Patent Practice, FD2 (formerly P3) – Drafting a Patent Application, FD3 (formerly P4) – Amending a Patent Application and FD4 (formerly P6) – Infringement and Validity of a Patent. Exemptions from FD2 and FD3 can be obtained by passing the corresponding European Qualifying Exams (Papers A & B, respectively).

Membership of the Chartered Institute of Patent Attorneys as a Fellow gives the right to call oneself a Chartered Patent Agent or Chartered Patent Attorney. To be elected as a Fellow, a person must have passed the UK Advanced Level exams, have accrued sufficient professional experience and be nominated by two existing Fellows.

=== United States ===
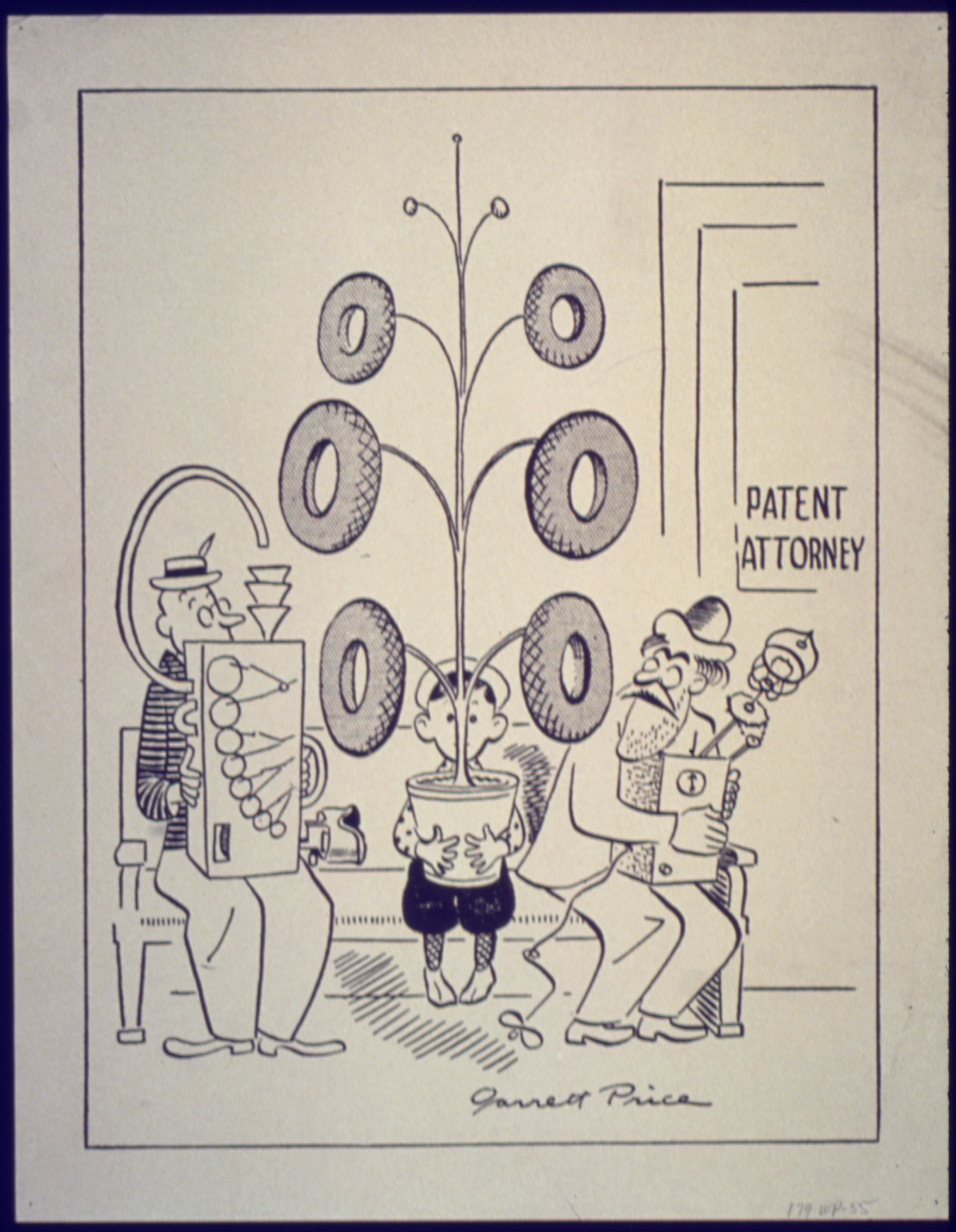
Poster Advertising a Patent Attorney, Office for Emergency Management. War Production Board

In the United States, a practitioner may either be a patent attorney or patent agent. Patent practitioners need to be registered to practice and represent clients before the United States Patent and Trademark Office (USPTO). Patent practitioners may prepare, file, and prosecute patent applications. Patent practitioners may also provide patentability opinions, as noted by the U.S. Supreme Court in Sperry v. Florida. In the time since the USPTO issued the first patent in 1790, approximately 73,000 have passed the USPTO registration examination, allowing them to register to prosecute patent applications. (This total does not include current patent examiners, who are not allowed to serve as patent attorneys or agents and thus do not appear on the list of enrolled practitioners.) Today, roughly 45,000 people are on the list of registered patent practitioners with slightly less than 34,000 of them also licensed to practice law. Of the states, California has the most patent practitioners, followed by New York and Texas. Per capita, Delaware has more patent practitioners than any state (not including DC). Patent practitioners are required to have a technical degree (such as engineering, chemistry or physics) and must take and pass the USPTO registration examination (officially titled Examination for Registration to Practice in Patent Cases Before the United States Patent and Trademark Office, and commonly referred to as the Patent Bar).

Patent attorneys must also be admitted to the practice of law in at least one state or territory of the U.S. or in the District of Columbia. Since patent attorneys are admitted to practice law in a state or territory, they can additionally provide legal services outside the Patent Office if practicing within the jurisdiction they are admitted to practice or if the law of the jurisdiction otherwise permits them to practice although not admitted in that jurisdiction. These legal services include advising a client on matters relating to the licensing of the invention; whether to appeal a decision by the Patent Office to a court; whether to sue for infringement; whether someone is infringing upon the claims of a client's issued patent; and conversely, whether a client is infringing the claims of someone else's issued patent. Patent agents cannot provide legal services of this nature, nor can they represent clients before the Trademark Office part of the USPTO.

To register as a patent practitioner one must pass the USPTO registration examination. This exam, commonly referred to as the "patent bar", tests a candidate's knowledge of patent law and USPTO policies and procedures as set forth in the Manual of Patent Examining Procedure (MPEP). The exam consists of 100 questions in multiple choice format, and is open-book with examinees permitted to use a PDF version of the MPEP. An unofficial score (Note: The score is "unofficial" in the sense that only ninety of the 100 questions are scored. "Accordingly, to pass the examination a candidate must correctly answer seventy percent (sixty-three) of the ninety scored questions.") of 70% indicates a passing grade on the exam. Upon successful completion of the examination, one will be labeled as a "patent attorney" if he/she has already been admitted to a state or territorial bar. However, engineers, scientists and any other science-based majors, as well as law students and law graduates who are not admitted to a bar, will be labeled as "patent agents" since they cannot give legal advice nor represent clients in court. The latest exam result statistics are for the 2014 fiscal year, when 2,799 exams were administered with 42.8% resulting in passing scores. The pass rate has dropped noticeably since the provisions of the America Invents Act, implemented in March 2013, were first included in the exam. For example, from June 9, 2005, through October 17, 2006, 58.2% of the 4,165 candidates passed the exam, which was based upon MPEP, 8th Edition, Revision 2. The current exam is based mostly on MPEP, 9th Edition, Revision 08.2017, as of August 16, 2018. Applicants who are not United States citizens and do not reside in the U.S. are not eligible for registration except as permitted by 37 CFR § 11.6(c). None of the world's countries except Canada reciprocates, giving U.S. citizens the right that the U.S. grants to their citizens. However, the Canadian Intellectual Property Office does not grant U.S. patent practitioners the same privileges the USPTO grants Canadian patent agents.

A patent practitioner needs an adequate understanding of technology to understand a client's invention and it is generally helpful for applicants to have a scientific or technical background. Patent lawyers must be capable of understanding the technical and scientific aspects of patents and patent applications.

There are three categories of qualification, through which an applicant for the patent bar may demonstrate the scientific and technical training necessary to provide valuable service to patent applicants:

- Category A: bachelor's degree in a required technical subject. The applicant submits proof of completion of an accredited bachelor's degree program in such academic fields as engineering, physics, pharmacology, biology, biochemistry, or computer science. It may be possible to qualify based upon a degree from an unaccredited institution, or a graduate degree in a technical field, and consideration may be given for other training and experience.
- Category B: bachelor's degree in another subject. If an applicant does not possess a degree that qualifies the applicant to take the examination under Category A, an applicant with a bachelor's degree must prove to the satisfaction of the OED Director that the applicant possesses scientific and technical training equivalent to that received at an accredited U.S. college or university for a bachelor's degree in one of the subjects that is acceptable under Category A. Other training and education may be relevant to the determination of qualification for the exam.
- Category C: practical engineering or scientific experience. An applicant who relies upon practical engineering or scientific experience but does not qualify under Category A or B may establish the required technical training by submitting proof of passage of the Fundamentals of Engineering Examination (FE test), a test of engineering fundamentals.

A candidate must also possess "good moral character and reputation" (37 CFR 11.7). If practicing outside the United States, a patent practitioner must be a U.S. citizen.

== Notable patent attorneys and agents ==
See List of patent attorneys and agents, including fictional characters who are patent attorneys.

== See also ==
- European Patent Institute (epi)
- International Federation of Intellectual Property Attorneys (FICPI)
- Patent engineer
- Patent examiner
- Power of attorney
- Trademark attorney
