= Arab Society for Certified Accountants =

Arab Society for Certified Accountants (ASCA) logo

The Arab Society for Certified Accountants (ASCA) is a non-profit professional association that aims to advance the profession of accounting, management, and related disciplines in the countries of the Arab League. ASCA also aims to maintain the professional independence of accountants and their protection through the application of professional supervisory measures as a way to elevate the professions of accounting and auditing.

== Establishment ==
The Arab Society for Certified Accountants (ASCA) was established in 1984 by a group of elite Arab accountants. ASCA is chaired by Mr. Talal Abu-Ghazaleh the Chairman of the Talal Abu-Ghazaleh Organization (TAGorg). ASCA is a non-profit professional accounting association which aims at advancing the profession of accounting, management and related disciplines in the countries of the Arab League. ASCA also aims to maintain the professional independence of accountants and their protection through the application of professional supervisory measures as a way to elevate the professions of accounting and auditing.

== ACPA Certificate ==
ASCA contributes to the administrative development in the Arab World by offering the Arab Certified Public Accountant (ACPA) program. The program is accredited by Cambridge University and is increasing recognized in many Arab countries especially that it aims at introducing a group of highly qualified professional accountants to the Arab community, who will take the lead in developing the business practices and economies.

== ASCA Membership ==
ASCA works hard and on a continuous basis to meet all professional requirements to make it eligible to receive appropriate international status. Accordingly, ASCA became an active member in the following international organizations and committees:

- The International Federation of Accountants (IFAC)
- The International Accounting Standards Board (IASB)
- UN Intergovernmental Working Group of Experts on International Standards of Accounting and Reporting (ISAR)
- The International Committee for Accounting Education and Research
- UN International Professional Accounting Qualification Committee (IPAQC).

In 1998, ASCA was invited by the International Accounting Standards Board and the International Federation of Accountants to participate in preparing International Accounting Standards, International Financial Reporting Standards and International Auditing, Assurance and Ethics pronouncements. These two professional organizations have accredited ASCA as the sole Arab society for translating all their publications on accountancy and auditing standards and distributing them throughout the Arab world.

ASCA also has participated in preparing quality control standards to evaluate the performance of accountants and members of professional societies who are members of the IFAC to ensure their good performance and adherence to the appropriate international standards.

Based on the value that ASCA attaches to continuing professional education, a number of specialized training programs in the fields of accounting and auditing are offered by ASCA or through recognized academic institutions throughout the Arab world such as the Talal Abu-Ghazaleh College of Business (TAGCB) at the German-Jordanian University (GJU).
