= Arab Knowledge and Management Society =

- Abbreviation: AKMS
- Formation: 1989; 37 years ago
- Headquarters: Amman
- Location: Prince Shaker Bin Zaid St, Shmeisani, Jordan
- President: Talal Abu-Ghazaleh
- Website: www.akms.org

The Arab Knowledge and Management Society (AKMS) is a Jordan-based regional non-profit association to promote knowledge and provide training in business management. It was established and chaired by Talal Abu-Ghazaleh, chairman and Founder of Talal Abu-Ghazaleh Organization (Tagorg).

The Society's main purpose is to facilitate knowledge sharing and management in Arab countries through promoting research and development in those fields and offering programs and qualifications that support its purpose.

== History ==
The idea behind the Society's set up came about when managers and businessmen in the Arab world became aware of the necessity of coordinating their efforts by organizing themselves into an association.

Accordingly, the Arab Management Society was established upon the invitation of the chairman of TAGorg Talal Abu-Ghazaleh on 29 August 1989, in Buffalo, New York, and was officially registered in Amman, Jordan, on 10 October 1990.

The society's name was amended to become the Arab Knowledge and Management Society (AKMS) on 23 December 2000, to emphasize the group's objective towards a knowledge society.

== Agreements with international organizations ==
At the end of 1994, AKMS submitted a membership application that was approved by the ISO/TC 176 Committee.

AKMS was the first Arab non-profit organization to become a member of one of the technical committees of the International Organization for Standardization (ISO). The Society was granted a membership in 1994 to join the most ISO technical committee 176/SC2.

The Society's membership in this committee is a representative one, as active membership is limited to official national standardization institutions. AKMS was one of only two Arab representatives that have joined the ISO/TC 176 committee, the other Arab organization being the Egyptian Standardizations Organization.

In 1998, the Society's representative, Khaled Abu-Osbeh was elected to join a group of experts called ISO/TC 176/SC 2/WG 18. This working group was responsible for laying down the ISO specifications.

In October 2001, during the committees’ meetings held in the British city of Birmingham, the Society was accepted as a member of the ISO/TC 176 committee and was invited to participate in the ISO/TC 176/SC3 committee, in recognition of its active role in the ISO/TC 176/SC2 committee.

In 2006, AKMS managed to secure cooperation agreements with several international organizations that work in the field of knowledge and quality management. AKMS was awarded membership of the British Institute of Quality Assurance (IQA). The IQA membership has granted the Society several advantages, among which are the provision of all publications and data related to quality on a regular basis as well as a Memorandum of Understanding (MoU) with the IQA to set up a mechanism for cooperation in the field of professional training and publications.

During that same year, AKMS activated its agreement with the International Standardized Testing Organization (ISTO). The agreement involved updating the Society's data on the ISTO website in addition to providing the Society with the marketing materials necessary to market the ISTO exams. Meanwhile, partnership with ICANN was also enhanced through several cooperation agreements signed.

In July 2007, AKMS launched the first quality-specialized program in the Arab region; the Arab Certified Quality Manager (ACQM) program.

== Cooperation agreements ==
AKMS has concluded several academic agreements through which it seeks to realize benefits for all members. Such agreements include the following:

- Association with Canisius College in New York.
- Cooperation with the Center for Applied Studies in International Negotiations (CASIN).
- Partnership Agreement with the International Standard Testing Organization (ISTO).
