= Copyright law of Syria =

Copyright law in Syria is regulated by the Copyright and Neighbouring Rights Law issued by Legislative Decree No. 62 of 2013. The Syrian Ministry of Culture, through its Copyright Office, is generally in charge of proposing copyright legislation to Parliament.

== History ==
On January 17, 1924, during the French Mandate over Syria and Lebanon, Decree 2385 was issued in which Article 145 defined works of art and literature as intellectual production.

On February 23, 1987, the Arab Society for Intellectual Property was founded, known at the time as the Arab Society for the Protection of Industrial Property with the mission of "promoting and developing Intellectual Property protection in the Arab world...". At the time, Syria was on the board alongside nine other Arab states. As of August 2017, Syria has one representative on the Society's board.

Syria's first copyright law was issued in 2001. This law was repealed in 2013 by Legislative Decree No. 62 of 2013 on Law for the Protection of Copyright and Neighbouring Rights.

== Main features ==
The Syrian copyright law grants copyright protection automatically without the need for any formalities to all literary, scientific, and artistic works irrespective of the value of the work, the purpose for which it was created or whether or not it is reduced to a material form. The law protects all forms of human expression including computer software and databases. In addition to the classic forms of copyright protection, the law also protects neighbouring rights such as performers rights, audio-visual producers rights, and broadcasting rights. The law also provides a mechanism for compulsory licensing and a collective rights management.

== Exclusive rights ==
The Syrian copyright law provides a number of moral and economic rights.

=== Moral rights ===
The Syrian copyright law provides the author with following moral rights:

- The right to decide the publication of the work for the first time and the method and timing of this publication.
- The right to attribute the work to himself, to choose not to disclose his identity, or to use an pseudonym.
- The right to reject any mutilation or change applied to his work.
- The right to reject any interference with his work in a way that affects his honour or reputation.
- The right to stop the circulation of his work if serious reasons emerged to justify this action.

=== Economic rights ===
The Syrian copyright law provides the author with the following economic rights:

- The right to copy the work using any medium.
- The right to translate a work, arrange it musically, or adapt into any other way.
- The right to distribute the work to the work by sale or any other disposition.
- The right to publicly perform the work.
- The right to make the work available to the public using the internet or any other method.

== Copyright term ==
Moral rights under the Syrian law are protected in perpetuity, but economic rights last only for a specific period of time as follows:

- Generally, all works are protected for the lifetime of the author plus 50 years.
- Audio visual works and collective works are protected for 50 years from the date of publication, if not published within 50 years from creation, then they are protected for 50 years from the date of creation.
- Applied art works are protected for 25 years from the date of the creation of the work.
- Databases are protected for 15 years from the date of the creation of the database.

== Membership to copyright treaties ==
Syria is a member to following copyright treaties:

- Berne Convention for the Protection of Literary and Artistic Works (Acceded on 2004-03-11)
- Rome Convention for the Protection of Performers, Producers of Phonograms and Broadcasting Organizations (Acceded on 2006-02-13)
- Beijing Treaty on Audiovisual Performances (Ratified signature on 2013-03-18)
- Marrakesh Treaty to Facilitate Access to Published Works for Persons Who Are Blind, Visually Impaired or Otherwise Print Disabled (Signed on 2013-11-22, not yet ratified)
