= Freewar =

2003 video game

- Developer: Jirko Cernik alias Sotrax
- Publisher: Intercyloon
- Platform: Web browser
- Release: 10.11.2003
- Genre: MMORPG

Freewar /ˈfriːwɔːr/ (short FW) is a browser-based massively multiplayer online role-playing game (MMORPG) developed by Intercycloon, a German software development team. Since 2003, its development has been led by the initiator of the "hobby" project, Jirko Cernik. In total there are 14 to 17 different servers and more than 100,000 registered accounts. Freewar is one of the most popular German browser-based games. The game is set in a medieval fantasy world. It is similar to Darkfleet, which is set in the same universe but occurs 10,000 years later. The game is available in two languages, German and English.

== Game worlds ==
The game, designed in the fantasy style, consists of a variety of landscapes in a virtual world with names like Konlir or Lorania. Players gradually move from room to room on a card made up of square boxes. Players can fight against other players (called "player vs. player," or PVP) or non-player characters. They fight, gain experience, and earn gold for solving quests. Characters can buy, use, sell, and trade weapons.

== Special features ==
Freewar runs in real-time. Players may either simulate travelling the world (for example, as a trader, fighter, or tissue researcher) or stay in residence (for example, as a stockbroker). Characters could learn skills that will enable them to pay for certain services such as more gold received for completed orders. Players can join or organize clans—small groups in order to defeat stronger enemies. In the game, there are buildings with special features, such as an auction hall, stock exchange, market hall, stores with varying prices, and buildings that regularly produce raw materials.

Game chat is integrated into various "channels". One can communicate internally within a clan, converse with another player on the same field, or talk to people on their friend lists.

In the 2007 vote for "super browser game" organized by Games Dynamite, Freewar was awarded second place in the Big Browser Games category, which includes games of more than 10,000 players.

== Costs ==
Registration and participation are free-to-play. Through 'Sponsorship' at a cost of €10 per 120 days of playtime, special features can be purchased. Examples of this include a queue for the time-based nature of learning skills, the possibility to change into a different race, or the ability to change the player's nickname and gender. It is also possible to purchase sponsorship for other players by using virtual currency. The operator places a high value on granting no benefits to sponsors, such as obtaining higher attack values.

== Variants ==
In addition to the traditional game, there is an RPG World (often abbreviated to RP) with special rules. Moderators enforce special rules, involving things like names that could disrupt the role-playing experience or speaking only in-character without reference to real life. The moderators or "guards" of this world provide people with unique quests to ensure that the well-known pen-and-paper RPG-style quests must be solved by the players. This is different from tasks in other worlds in terms of duration, content, and rewards. The RPG world is unlike the standard version of the game.

Additionally, there is a world for Freewar called Action Freewar (commonly shortened to AF). This world is reset every five months. It is different from the normal Freewar world in that it has a higher respawn rate of NPCs. Also, more money is accumulated from killing these enemies.

== Name ==
The name Freewar is derived from the domain freewar.de, which Sotrax had originally registered in 2003 as an attempt to intercept requests from people on the Internet for Freeware-programs but making a typo when searching for it. Later, he noticed that the name fit well with an unnamed game he recently programmed. Sotrax ran the Alpha version of the game under the domain freewar.de. This name became permanent, and Sotrax kept Freewar as the name for the game. This name has been a trademark at the German Patent and Trade Mark Office since 2006.

== Freewar meeting ==
To promote social contact between the Freewar community outside the virtual world as well as to organize dedicated players, Freewar meetings have taken place for several years. Meetings are usually held in Germany twice a year. Locations vary and popularity is increasing. Several dozen regular players from Germany, Austria, and Switzerland travel to these meetings.
