= Erich Häusser =

German jurist (1930–1999)

Erich Otto Häußer (June 9, 1930 – May 17, 1999) was a German lawyer and judge. He served on the Federal Patent Court, served on the Federal Court of Justice, and was the president of the German Patent Office from 1976 to 1995.

== Early life and education ==
Häußer was born on June 9, 1930, in Markt Taschendorf / Steigerwald.

After completing his Abitur at the Adam-Kraft-Gymnasium in Schwabach he studied law at the University of Erlangen, receiving his law degree in 1952. He passed the Staatsexamen in 1953 and was called to the bar in 1957.

== Legal and patent career ==
In 1958, Häußer became a judge on the District of the Higher Regional Court, Nuremberg.

From 1959 until 1963 he worked at the Bavarian Ministry of Justice in Munich and from 1963 until 1965 at the Federal Ministry of Justice in Bonn.

In 1965, Häußer became a judge on the Federal Patent Court.

In 1972, Häußer became a judge on the Federal Court of Justice in Karlsruhe.

In 1976, Häußer became president of the German Patent and Trade Mark Office, the national patent office of Germany. The previous president was Kurt Haertel. He served as president from January 1, 1976, to June 30, 1995. Häußer was president of the patent office during the reunification of Germany. During his presidency, Erich Häusser was recognised for the strengthening of the German Patent Office after the establishment of the European Patent Office, as well as the integration of the employees of the Patent Office of the former GDR following German reunification.

In 1987, Häußer became an honorary member of the Arab Society for Intellectual Property. In 1995, Häusser became an international advisor for Abu-Ghazaleh Intellectual Property.

In 1990 he was named Honorary Professor at the Renmin University in Beijing. In 1991 he was appointed Honorary Professor at Zhejiang University in Hangzhou.

Häußer is credited with saying the quotation "Wer nicht erfindet, verschwindet. Wer nicht patentiert, verliert." Translated to English, the quote is "Those who do not invent, disappear. Those who do not patent, lose."

== Death ==
Häußer died on May 17, 1999.
