= Rudloff =

Rudloff is a German surname.

== Origin and meaning ==
"Rudloff" derives the name Rudolf by metathesis. It combines the Old High German words "hruod" (meaning "fame" or "glory") and "wolf" (meaning "wolf").

== People with the surname ==
- Cornelia Rudloff-Schäffer (b. 1957), German judge and president of the German Patent and Trade Mark Office
- Gregg Rudloff (1955–2019), American sound engineer
- Jan-Peter Rudloff, German arachnologist
- Marcel Rudloff (1923–1996), Alsatian lawyer and politician, member of French Senate and mayor of Strasbourg
- Tex Rudloff (1926–2015), American sound engineer
- Erik Bongcam-Rudloff (b. 1957), Scientist
- Roger Rudloff (b. 1973), Dallas Texas Sergeant of Police
