= Gebrauchsmuster =

German and Austrian intellectual property right

In German and Austrian patent laws, the Gebrauchsmuster (GebrM), also known as German utility model or Austrian utility model, is a patent-like, intellectual property right protecting inventions.

The Gebrauchsmuster is slightly different from the patent. It mainly differs from the patent in that processes and methods cannot be protected by a Gebrauchsmuster, only products can. Furthermore, the term of a Gebrauchsmuster, that is its maximum lifetime, is 10 years from the date of registration. In contrast, a patent has usually a term of 20 years from the date of filing of the application.

== Germany ==
The German utility model has some interesting characteristics, when compared to the German patent or to the European patent designating Germany:

- Prior art considered for examining novelty and inventive step is somewhat more limited:
  - Oral disclosures are not taken into account, only written disclosures are taken into account;
  - Public prior use outside Germany is not taken into account;
  - A six-month grace period before the priority date is provided for written disclosures or prior public use made by applicants or their predecessors in title.
- They are not substantially examined. Only registration is sufficient to obtain a utility model.

German utility models are made available to the public directly when they are registered (Eintragungstag, the date of entry of the German utility model in the register of utility models of the Deutsches Patent- und Markenamt (DPMA)), i.e. before the publication date (Bekanntmachung):

The date of entry [in the register of utility models, or Eintragungstag] corresponds to the date on which a list (typically containing several hundred entries and indicating the IPC class and the DPMA file number of German utility models for each entry) is laid open for inspection at the premises of the DPMA. A member of the public is allowed to inspect any file from that list as of said date.

In contrast, patents are made available to the public 18 months after the filing date, unless the applicant requests early publication.

The German Gebrauchsmuster is regulated by German Gebrauchsmuster Act (in German: Gebrauchsmustergesetz) and German Gebrauchsmuster Regulation (in German: Verordnung zur Ausführung des Gebrauchsmustergesetzes).

== Austria ==
The Austrian utility model is similar to the German utility model. The main differences are:

- A search report is carried out within 6 to 8 months. No additional searching fee is required.
- The range of protection is broader than the German utility model. There is additional protection for:
  - Logic algorithm for computer software
  - Processes
  - Therapy methods for animals

== See also ==
- German Patent and Trade Mark Office (German: Deutsches Patent- und Markenamt; abbreviation: DPMA)
- Geschmacksmuster (German industrial design right)
- Auslegeschrift
