= EZN =

EZN or eZn may refer to:

== EZN ==
- Electrified Zone Number, code assigned to Pennsylvania Railroad class DD1 pairs
- Abbreviation for Erfinderzentrum Norddeutschland, 2012 winner of the Rudolf-Diesel-Medaille award

== eZn ==
- eZn, global hairstyling brand represented by Taeyeon
