= Franz Maria Feldhaus =

German engineer

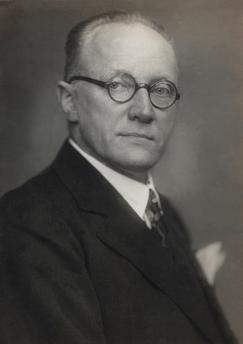
- Born: April 26, 1874; Neuss, North Rhine-Westphalia, Germany
- Died: May 22, 1957 (aged 83); Wilhelmshaven, Lower Saxony, Germany

Academic work
- Discipline: History of science and technology

Franz Maria Feldhaus (26 April 1874, in Neuss – 22 May 1957, in Wilhelmshaven) was a German engineer, historian of science, and scientific writer. He was known in the late 1950s as "Germany's most well-known and most prolific writer on the history of technology."

== Biography ==
Born in Neuss as son of a pharmacist, Feldhaus studied electrical engineering without receiving his degree. Later on the occasion of his 50th birthday in 1924 he was awarded an honorary doctorate by the RWTH Aachen in recognition of his accomplishments in the field of the history of science. In 1928 he was elected full member of the French "Académie d'Histoire des Sciences."

Late 1890s Feldhaus started to work as inventor and doing odd jobs, while starting to be interested in the history of science. In his Mannheim Workshop for Precision Mechanics he described himself as engineer - this term at that time still unprotected. In 1900 he gave up his practical activities and worked henceforth as historian of science and freelance writer. Feldhaus told Willy Ley that he began writing books on the history of science because, while unemployed, he read books on the subject at the library and believed that he could write better ones.

Feldhaus later attended lectures by Theodor Beck (1839–1917) in Darmstadt, who had published on the history of engineering. After his death in 1917 he inherited his estate and research in the field. Over the years Feldhaus built up without any government support an archive on the history of engineering, which became one of the largest private archives in Germany. In Heidelberg and later in Berlin Feldhaus built a private institute, entitled "Quellenforschungen zur Geschichte der Technik und der Naturwissenschaften" (Source research on the history of engineering and natural science) in 1909. He also founded the company Historia-Foto GmbH, which might have been the first commercial image archive in Germany. Immediately after the Second World War in 1945-46 Feldhaus was appointed Director of the National Museum in Neustrelitz. The last years of his life he lived in Wilhelmshaven.

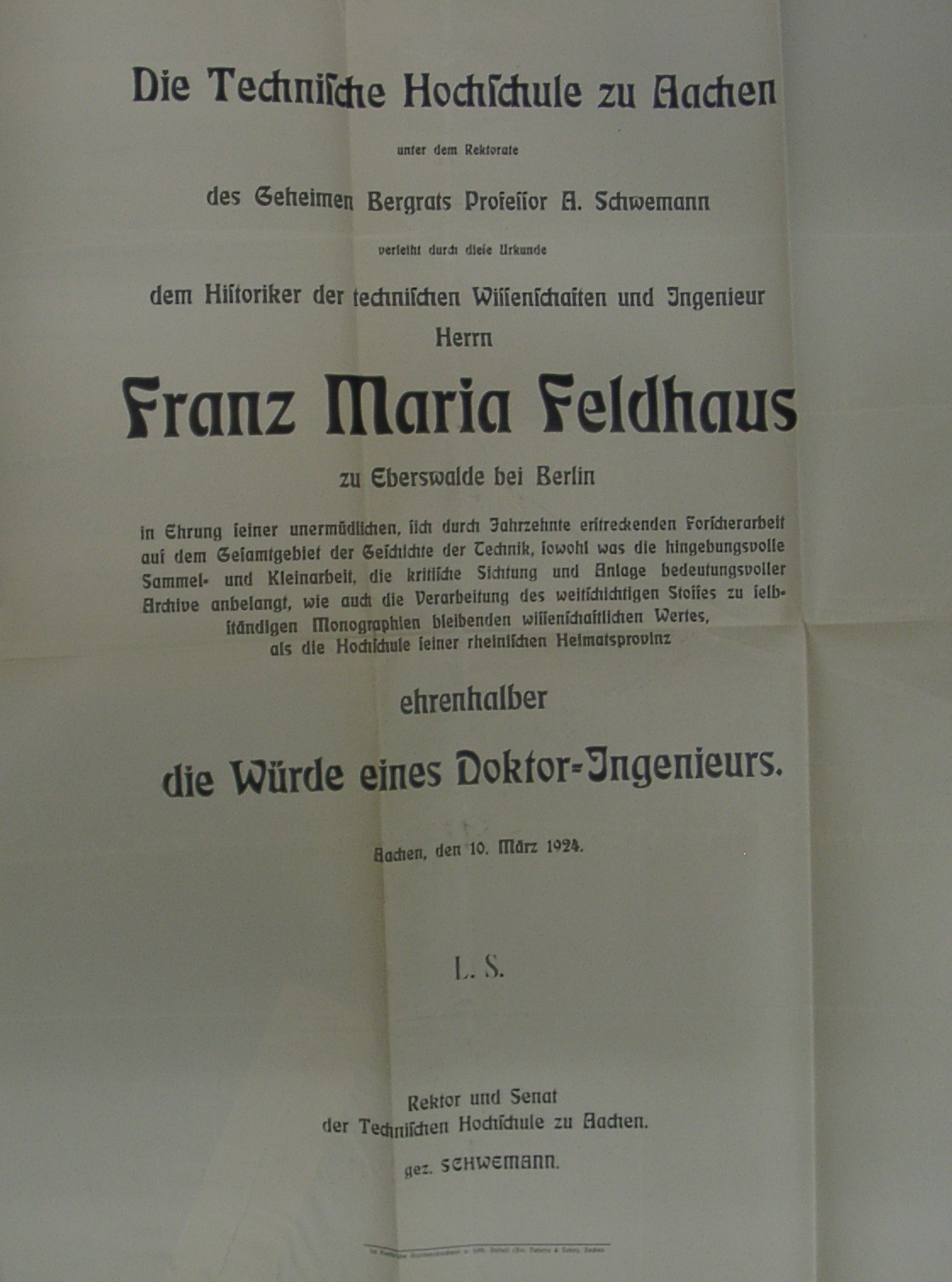
Honorary doctorate by the RWTH Aachen, 1924.

In 1959 Feldhaus posthumously received the Rudolf-Diesel-Medaille from the German Institute for Inventions. The poet and novelist Eva Zeller (born 1923) is one of Feldhaus' daughters.

== Work ==
=== Lexikon der Erfindungen und Entdeckungen, 1904 ===
Feldhaus' first publication was the Lexikon der Erfindungen und Entdeckungen, (Dictionary of inventions and discoveries) in 1904, which gave a timeline of inventions and discoveries in the fields of science and technology. This work was designed as reference, and not for educational purposes.

=== Institute for research in the history of engineering, natural science and industry, 1909/19 ===
In 1909 Feldhaus founded the "Quellenforschungen zur Geschichte der Technik und Naturwissenschaften" Institute In 1919 this institute was turned into the GmbH "Quellenforschungen zur Geschichte der Technik und Industrie," and since 1927 "Geschichte der Technik, e.V.".

=== The History of Technical Drawing, 1960-63 ===
Feldhaus' Geschichte des technischen Zeichnens is translated into English and published in 1960-63 as "The History of Technical Drawing." The work started with the words:

"From the time man began to think, invent and actively create, he has endeavored to express his thoughts pictorially, both for his own assistance and to make himself understood by others..."

A 1961 review about this work by R. S. Hartenberg in the Proceedings of the American Society for Engineering Education commented about this opening line, that

"...herein is the essence of graphics. The passing centuries have brought about new concepts and improvement in methods; nevertheless industry's need for the pictorial communicator will remain. Industry will continue looking for graduates equipped with a thorough understanding of graphic principles and with the skill required to execute neat and accurate drawings..."

Hartenberg further explained, that the book primarily intents to give the interested layman a good survey. After an introduction it starts with a section "Earliest Time, Ancient Time and the Middle Ages," which:

"... roughs out the course of drawing from the ice-age cave-paintings through the graphic arts of Egypt, Mesopotamia, and Arabia to west European practice, commenting on media and tools. Attention is called to a device common to the civilized drawings, viz., that of showing important parts located in different planes swung into a single plane."

The section on the Technologist's Professions (p. 5) amplified, that development of the underlying concepts, as Hartenberg (1961) summarized:

"... in Homeric Greece, art and technology bore the same name (and stigma? ) instead of being placed in opposition at they are today. With the Romans all things that were built, from cities to engines of war, came under the concept of architecture (as with Vitruvius); the practitioners — people of ingenuity and inventiveness — were called architecti...."

And furthermore:

"...We learn that Rome had an " engineering " school in 228, and that Harun al-Rashid founded a technical school in Baghdad in 807. The title of engineer appears in the twelfth century, its use spreading under the urgings of the Crusaders who needed military engineers to back and encourage their Faith. Leonardo da Vinci, that peculiarly gifted man, received an appointment as engineer, and perhaps set a style, for in later generations many who achieved fame as engineers and inventors came from the non-technical ranks of life..."

== Selected publications ==
- Lexikon der Erfindungen und Entdeckungen: Auf den Gebieten der Naturwissenschaften und Technik. 1904.
- Feldhaus' Buch der Erfindungen. Unterhaltende Belehrungen aus der Geschichte der Technik, Oestergaard, Berlin 1907.
- Ruhmesblätter der technik von den urerfindungen bis zur gegenwart (1910)
- Die Technik der Vorzeit, der geschichtlichen Zeit und der Naturvölker. Ein Handbuch für Archäologen und Historiker, Museen und Sammler, Kunsthändler und Antiquare, Engelmann, Leipzig und Berlin 1914. Reprint 1971.
- Modernste Kriegswaffen --alte Erfindungen (1915)
- Die Kinderschuhe der neuen Verkehrsmittel, Leipzig 1927.
- Kulturgeschichte der Technik I und II, 1928. Reprint 1980.
- Die Technik der Antike und des Mittelalters, Athenaion, Potsdam 1931. Reprint 1971.
- Männer deutscher Tat, Steinhaus, München, wahrscheinlich 1934.
- Der Weg in die Technik. Ein Buch zum Schauen und Denken, Leipzig 1935.
- Geschichte des technischen Zeichnens. 1953. 2nd enlarged edition, edited by E. Schruff, Wilhelmshaven 1959.
