= Rudolf-Diesel-Medaille =

German industry award

The Rudolf-Diesel-Medaille is an award by the German Institute for Inventions (Deutsches Institut für Erfindungswesen, D.I.E.) in memory of Rudolf Diesel for inventions and the entrepreneurial and economical implications accounting to the laureate. Since 1953 the award has been presented yearly until 1969 and then irregularly every two or three years.

== Laureates 1953 to 1959 ==
=== 1953 ===
- Eugen Diesel
- Hermann Röchling
- Christoph Wirth

1954:

- Ernst Heinkel
- Viktor Kaplan
- Paul Nipkow
- Hermann Oberth
- Wolfgang Putlitz
- Julius Schierenbeck
- Joseph Vollmer

1955:

- Herrmann Amme
- Carl Friedrich Benz
- Hans Bredow
- Heinrich Buschmann
- Ella Conradty
- Hans Daams
- Wilhelm Geldermann
- Alexander Meißner
- Ernst Neumann-Neander
- Walter Poller
- Hans Rukop
- Max Schimmel
- Hans Vogt
- Magokichi Yamaoka
- Ferdinand Zeppelin
- Berthold Zunckel

1956:

- Friedrich Dessauer
- Roland Faber-Castell
- Siegfried Meurer

1959:

- Thorsten Althin
- Franz Maria Feldhaus
- Paul Kleinewefers
- F. Lindenmaier
- Alex Lonsinger
- Johann Mangold
- Auguste Piccard
- Karl Röder
- Herbert Storek
- Herbert Venediger

== Laureates 1960 to 1969 ==
1961:

- Claudius Dornier
- Arthur Göhlert
- Alfred Horn
- Georg Hufnagel
- Hanns Klemm
- Carl Graf von Klinckowström
- Carl Rudolf Paul Klingspor
- Hans Ledwinka
- Arthur Mainka
- Hans Rhode
- Karl Heinz Schmidt

1962:

- Hans Baier
- Walter Bauer
- Albert Bettag
- Ernst Cvikl
- J. Helmut Danzer
- Frank James Elvy
- John Franklin Enders
- Artur Ermert
- Igo Etrich
- Ernst Fuchs
- Konrad Grebe
- Reinhold Hagmann
- Theodor Hahn
- Walter Hebel
- Erich Hensel
- Maximilian Hornsteiner
- Josef Kainz
- Rudolf Kaiser
- Gustav Kammerer
- Heinz Kemper
- Richard Langer
- C. Walter Leupold
- Wilhelm Loges
- Walter Meining
- Hermann Michael
- Hermann Mücher
- Walter J. Noske
- Walter Philipp
- Robert Rahner
- Ernst Reichelt
- Josef Roiser
- Friedrich Schildberger
- F. W. Schlegel
- Hans Schleicher
- Wilhelm Schmidt
- Hermann Staudinger
- Hugo Tafelmaier

1963:

- Erwin Baas
- Gottlob Bauknecht
- Ludwig Baumann
- Otto Alfred Becker
- Horst-Dieter Bohne
- Heinrich Brandhoff
- Hugo Bremer
- Erich Döring
- Ernst Giller
- Richard Glimpel
- Wilhelm Hessenstein
- Carl Hermann Heise
- Ernst Khuon-Wildegg (Ernst von Khuon)
- Max Heinrich Kress
- Heinrich Kukuck
- Egon Larsen
- Otto Lilienthal
- Willi Lippert
- Friedrich Maier
- Christian Meyer
- Willi Müller
- Adolf Nowak
- Erich Olschowski
- Erich Rabe
- Walter Reppe
- Josef Wilhelm Risse
- Hans Rössner
- Paul Schlack
- Otto Siemen
- Fritz Tolkien
- Ulrich Tuchel
- Hellmuth Walter
- Peter Weber

1964:

- Heinrich Ballhof
- Otto P. Bühler
- Gustav Erhart
- Rudolf Fitzke
- Paul F. Forbach
- Gerhard Frank
- Willy O. Herrmann
- Fritz John Jacobsen
- Richard Jahre
- Hans Klaas
- Hans-Ulrich Klein
- Alfred Kretzschmar
- Hans Lindemann
- Ernst Linden
- Wolfram Lindner
- Wilhelm Nikolaus Moers
- Josef Nagler
- Herbert Neuhaus
- Horst Pasternack
- Kurt Pentzlin
- Ernst Sachs
- Rolf Sander
- Franz Schmid
- Alois Schmitt
- Eugen Heinrich Fritz Soeding
- Walter Storz
- Fritz Walther
- Willy Wolf
- Frotz Zoder

1965:

- Apollinaris-Brunnen AG
- August Arnold
- Paul Baumann
- Wernher von Braun
- Hermann Buchholz
- José de Soto Burgos
- Curt Eichler
- Wilhelm Ernst
- Alfred Eschebach
- Franz Ferrari
- Albin Johansson
- Kurt Kaschke
- Ottmar Kasparowski
- Fritz Kauer
- Hans Kestler
- Kurt A. Körber
- Paul Krauß
- Friedrich Nallinger (Fritz Nallinger)
- Udo Passavant
- Alfred Pierburg
- Robert Richter
- Georg Rieper
- Rudolf Rzehulka
- Erhard Sattmann
- Erwin Schwarz
- Karl Sprenger
- Wilhelm Stürmer
- Hans Thoma
- Edith Weyde
- Matheus Wiest
- Johannes Wisser
- Anton Wörner
- Hans Ziller
- Hans Zöllner

1966:

- Hans Beck
- Herbert Berg
- Paul Dannemann
- Alfons Drittenthaler
- Karl Eichstädt
- Edgar Frank
- Johann Rudolf Glauber
- Franz R. Habicht
- Karl Harraeus
- Günter Hasenbäumer
- Walter Heimann
- Josef Hoffmann
- Hans Kallas
- Peter Kisteneich
- Josef Kobold
- Fritz Kreis
- Curt Lommel
- Friedrich Martin
- Otto Meyer
- Karl Mienes
- Rolf Moroni
- Siegfried Nitzsche
- Gottfried Severin Paeffgen
- Moritz Pöhlmann
- Erwin Raulf
- Harald Romanus
- Ludwig Schanz

1967:

- Richard Antretter
- Béla Barényi
- Walter Baur
- Hugo Brendel
- Alfred Buch
- Werner Fuhrmann
- Ernst Hatz
- Heinz Jäger
- Karl Jericke
- Willy Kraus
- Erich Kraut
- Ernst Mahle
- Alois Mengele
- Karl F. Nägele
- Robert Plagwitz
- Kurt Schönenberger
- Wilhelm Staffel

1968:

- Georg Bergler
- Karl Breuer
- Franz Josef Fleißner
- Armin Heim
- Rudolf Kellermann
- Lorenz Anton Kersting
- Wilhelm Kölsch
- Karl Krauß
- Hellmut Kreß
- Alfred Krohe
- Harald Loebermann
- Herbert Matis
- Herbert Müller-Neuhaus
- Stanford R. Ovshinsky
- Carl Pieper
- Wunibald Puchner
- Eduard Reimer
- Karlheinz Roth
- Ernst Ruska
- Helmut Sallinger
- René Schubert

1969:

- Ludwig Bölkow
- Kurt Friedrich
- Arnold Giller
- Max Koehler
- Friedrich Krauss
- Karl Kroyer
- Manfred R. Kühnle
- Wolfgang Ritter
- Konrad Zuse

== Laureates 1970 to 1979 ==
=== 1972 ===
- Walter Baier, Stockdorf
- Herbert Haas, Oberstenfeld
- Edmund Munk, Oberstenfeld
- Hermann Renner, Magstadt
- Karl Heinz Vahlbrauk, Bad Gandersheim

=== 1975 ===
- Fritz Bauer, Altdorf
- Kurt Becker, Obernkirchen
- Hermann Burkhard, Reutlingen
- Friedrich Burmester, Reutlingen
- Otto Oeckl, Munich
- Gottfried Piekarski, Burghausen
- Ewald Pirson, Burghausen
- Ulrich Poppe, Falkenstein / Oberpfalz
- Georg-Gerd Richter, Darmstadt
- Franz Rudolf, Schwäbisch Gmünd

=== 1977 ===
- Josef Berg, Heidelberg
- Wolfgang Bogen, Berlin
- Hans Eckstaedt, Wuppertal
- Kurt Eichweber, Hamburg
- Rudolf Gäth, Limburgerhof
- Siegfried Lehsten, Eßlingen
- Julius Lidenmayer, Augsburg
- Walter Mayer, Zirndorf
- Klaudius Patzelt, Welzheim
- Hilmar Vits, Leichlingen
- H. Ch. Roy, Planegg
- Kurt Schade, Fürth
- Karl-Heinz Steigerwald, Puchheim
- Max Mengeringhausen, Würzburg

== Laureates 1980 to 1989 ==
=== 1980 ===
- Uwe Classen, Zirndorf
- Wilhelm Hegler, Bad Kissingen
- Manfred Helfrecht, Poppenreuth
- Engelbert Krempl, Burgkirchen
- Alfred Meier, Nellingen
- Heinz Müller, Burgkirchen
- Ernst Schulze, Hamburg
- Hans Viessman, Battenberg
- Manfred Wick, München
- Heinrich Welke, Erlangen
- Walther Zarges, Murnau am Staffelsee

=== 1982 ===
- Armin Bauder, Neckarsulm
- Ernst Christian, Nürnberg
- Heinz Hölter, Gladbeck
- Alexander Kückens, Reinfeld (Holstein)
- Xaver Lipp, Ellwangen
- Josef W. Manger, Arnstein
- Hannes Marker, Garmisch-Partenkirchen
- Julius Maus von Resch, Stuttgart
- Hans Sauer, Deisenhofen
- Wolfgang Seikritt, Usingen
- Erwin Sick, Waldkirch
- Rolf Susemihl, Bad Homburg
- Friedrich Stastny, Ludwigshafen
- Johannes Steinwart, Obersulm
- Herbert Zimmermann, Hagen
- Rudolf Zinsser, Kelheim

=== 1984 ===
- Alfred Börner, Niederkail/Eifel
- Volker Dolch, Dietzenbach
- Ludwig Elsbett, Hilpoltstein
- Kurt Fickelscher, Frankenthal
- Gerhard W Goetze, Wuppertal
- Berthold Leibinger, Gerlingen
- Adolf Michel, Seeshaupt
- Peter Pfleiderer, München
- Heinz Süllhöfer, Düsseldorf
- Maximilian Wächtler, Hamburg

=== 1986 ===
- Reinhold Ficht, Kirchseeon
- Otto Breckner, Offenburg
- Bernhard Dietrich, Eichenau
- Artur Fischer, Waldachtal
- Hasso Freundner, Halver
- Otto Grimm, Hamburg
- Manfred Held, Schrobenhausen
- Ernst Nönnicke, Hamburg
- Rolf Schnause, Eckental
- Ernst Schuhbauer, München
- Hans Spies, Schrobenhausen
- Richard Vetter, Peine
- Felix Walker, Lindau
- Robert Wolff, Engeln

=== 1988 ===
- Manfred von Ardenne, Dresden
- Otto Blunck, Lübeck-Travemünde
- Albert Blum, Lohmar
- Wilfried Goda, Rissen, Hamburg
- Bruno Gruber, Olching
- Walter Holzen, Meersburg
- Gerd Küppe, Bad Salzuflen
- Erhard Mayer, Lenggries
- Mircon Padovicz, Berlin
- Peter Riedhammer, Nürnberg
- Wolfgang Zimmermann, Kelkheim

== Laureates 1990 to 1999 ==
=== 1990 ===
- Angel Balevsky, Sofia
- Uwe Ballies, Kiel
- Alfons Ernst, Traunreut
- Erich Häußer, Starnberg
- Norbert Heske, Türkenfeld
- Helmut Hoegl, Pullach
- Hermann Kronseder, Niedertraubling
- Hilmar Leuthäuser, Wiesenfeld/Coburg
- Albert Linz, Rösrath
- Hans Joachim von Ohain, Dayton, Ohio
- Hans Peter Schabert, Erlangen
- Herbert Schneekluth, Aachen
- Heinrich Waas, Bonn
- Walter Weishaupt, München
- Joachim Wendt, Buxtehude
- Helmut Würfel, Völklingen

=== 1993 ===
- Alex Faller, Ergoldsbach
- Hermann Fischer, Augsburg
- Erhard Glatzel, Heidenheim
- Janos Ladik, Erlangen
- Georg Spinner, Feldkirchen-Westerham
- Kurt Stoll, Esslingen am Neckar
- Walter Föckersperger, Wurmsham

=== 1997 ===
- Jürgen Dethloff, Hamburg-Othmaschen
- Joseph Eichmeier, Neufahrn
- Manfred Eigen, Göttingen
- Wolfgang Giloi, Berlin
- Wilhelm Häberle, Scheer
- Karsten Henco, Hilden
- Xaver Hersacher, Westhausen
- Waldemar Helmut Kuherr, Düsseldorf
- Heinz Lindenmeier, Planegg
- Qingshan Liu, München
- Yongxiang Lu, Peking/China
- D.W. Lübbers, Dortmund
- Jury Malyschew, Moscow/Russia
- Rudolf Rigler, Stockholm
- Karl-Ulrich Rudolph, Witten
- Hanns Rump, Dortmund
- K.A. Schmidt, Karlsruhe
- Siegfried Schulte, Lüdenscheid
- Rudolf Zobrow, Düsseldorf

== Laureates 2000 to 2009 ==
=== 2001 ===
- Victor Dulger, Heidelberg
- Olaf Kiesewetter, Geschwenda
- Hans-Guido Klinkner, St. Ingbert
- Hans-Diedrich Kreft, Dassendorf
- Julius Meimberg, Münster

=== 2004 ===
- Walter Sennheiser, Wendemark
- Jörgen Rasmussen, Skafte
- Reinhold Würth, Künzelsau
- Anton Kathrein, Rosenheim
- Sybill Storz, Tuttlingen
- Günter Kampichler, Ruhstorf a.d. Rott

=== 2006 ===
- Theodor W. Hänsch, München
- Bernd Gombert, Grafrath
- Harald Marquardt, Rietheim-Weilheim
- Walter Reis, Obernburg

=== 2008 ===
- Gerhard Ertl, Berlin
- Andreas Grünberg, Jülich
- Dietmar Hopp, Walldorf
- Hasso Plattner, Walldorf
- Klaus Tschira, Heidelberg
- Aloys Wobben, Aurich
- Gerhard Sturm, Mulfingen
- Hans Härle, Bopfingen
- Heinz Leiber, Oberriexingen

== Laureates since 2010 ==
=== 2010 ===
- Friedhelm Loh, Rittal, Herborn
- Wulf Bentlage, Geohumus International, Frankfurt am Main
- Zeitschrift "Innovationsmanager", F.A.Z.-Institut, Frankfurt am Main
- Europäische Patentakademie, Munich

=== 2012 ===
- Hans Peter Stihl
- Jochen Opländer (WILO SE)
- Erfinderzentrum Norddeutschland (EZN)
- Deutschlandradio – DRadio Wissen

=== 2013 ===
- Christof Bosch (Bosch-Gruppe)
- Jörg Mittelsten Scheid (Vorwerk)
- Stiftung Jugend forscht
- Wissen vor acht (ARD)
