= Geschmacksmuster =

Legal protection of industrial design

Under German law, the registered design (German: eingetragenes Design), formerly called Geschmacksmuster ("aesthetic model"), is a form of intellectual property that extends industrial design rights over the visual design of objects that is not purely utilitarian. The term of a Geschmacksmuster is twenty-five years (§ 27 (2) GeschmMG), as it is for a community design.

== See also ==
- Design patent
- Deutsches Patent- und Markenamt – German Patent and Trade Mark Office
- Directive 98/71/EC on the legal protection of designs – an EU Directive
- Gebrauchsmuster – German utility model
- Trade dress
