= Hans-Jürgen Quadbeck-Seeger =

German chemist

Hans-Jürgen Quadbeck-Seeger (born 29 May 1939 in Insterburg, East Prussia) is a German chemist, inventor, and author. He was Research Director at BASF (from 1990 to 1997), and President of the German Chemical Society.

== Career ==
Hans-Jürgen Quadbeck-Seeger studied chemistry, physics and anthropology in Munich. In 1967 he received a PhD for his thesis in the field of organic chemistry. In the same year he started working at BASF in the synthesis of precursors for dyes department. In 1969 he became head of the research group in the dye and pharmaceutical sector. In addition to his research activities, he coordinated the company's connection to scientific institutions. Later, Quadbeck-Seeger became the director of the Central Division Main Laboratory. In 1985, the University of Heidelberg appointed him honorary professor of industrial chemistry. From 1989 to 1997, he served as Research Director at BASF. Between 1991 and 1994 he was a member of the Senate, and between 1994 and 1995 he served as president of the German Chemical Society. From 1996 to 2000 he was a member of the Senate and the Board of Directors of the Max Planck Society. In 1998 he was awarded the Federal Cross of Merit First Class; and in 2014, he was awarded the Lorenz Oken Medal. Quadbeck-Seeger has over 50 patents and authored several books.

== See also ==
- Deutsches Patent- und Markenamt

== Relevant literature ==
- Mieder, Wolfgang. “‘Wortspiele: Scrabble mit Gedanken.’ Zu den sprichwörtlichen Aphonitionen von Hans-Jürgen Quadbeck-Seeger”. Proverbium vol. 38, 2021, pp. 237-258. Proverbium PDF
