= Yanmar =

Japanese diesel engine manufacturer

Yanmar Holdings Co., Ltd.
- Logo used since 2013

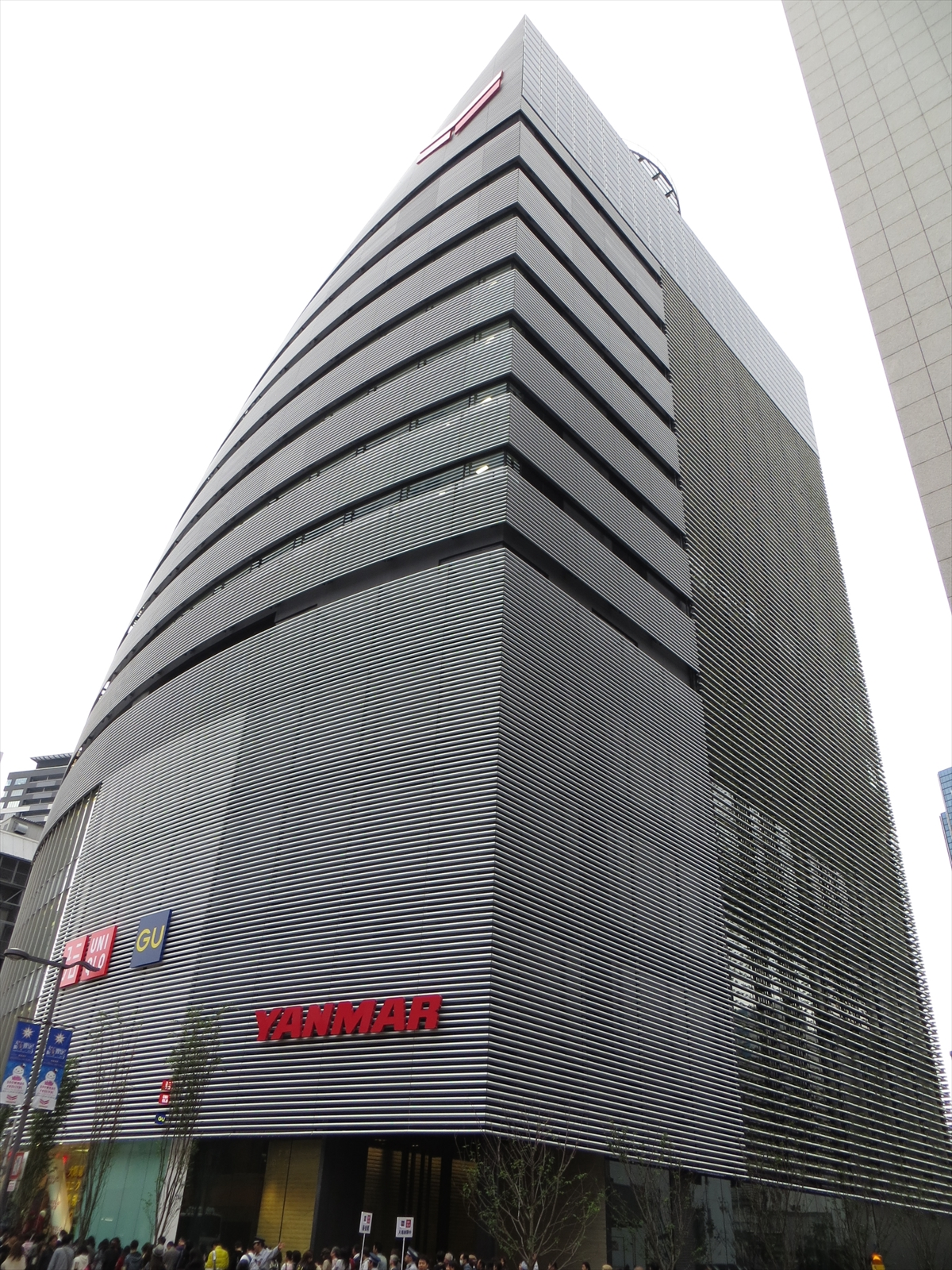
- Headquarters in Kita-ku, Osaka
- Native name: ヤンマーホールディングス株式会社
- Company type: Privately held
- Industry: Automotive; Heavy equipment; Agricultural machinery
- Founded: 1912; 114 years ago (as Yamaoka Hatsudoki Kosakusho); April 1, 2013; 13 years ago (as Yanmar Holdings)
- Founder: Magokichi Yamaoka
- Headquarters: 1-32, Chayamachi, Kita-ku, Osaka, Japan
- Key people: Takehito Yamaoka, President
- Products: Construction equipment; Tractors; Watercraft; Unmanned aerial vehicles; Diesel Engines
- Revenue: ¥703.8 billion (March 2016) consolidated
- Number of employees: 17,974 (consolidated as of 31 March 2016)
- Website: https://www.yanmar.com/global/

Yanmar Holdings Co., Ltd. (ヤンマーホールディングス株式会社, Yanmā Hōrudingusu Kabushiki-Gaisha) is a Japanese diesel engine, heavy machinery and agricultural machinery manufacturer founded in Osaka, Japan, in 1912. Yanmar manufactures and sells engines used in a wide range of applications, including seagoing vessels, pleasure boats, construction equipment, agricultural equipment and generator sets. It also manufactures and sells, climate control systems, and aquafarming systems, in addition to providing a range of remote monitoring services.

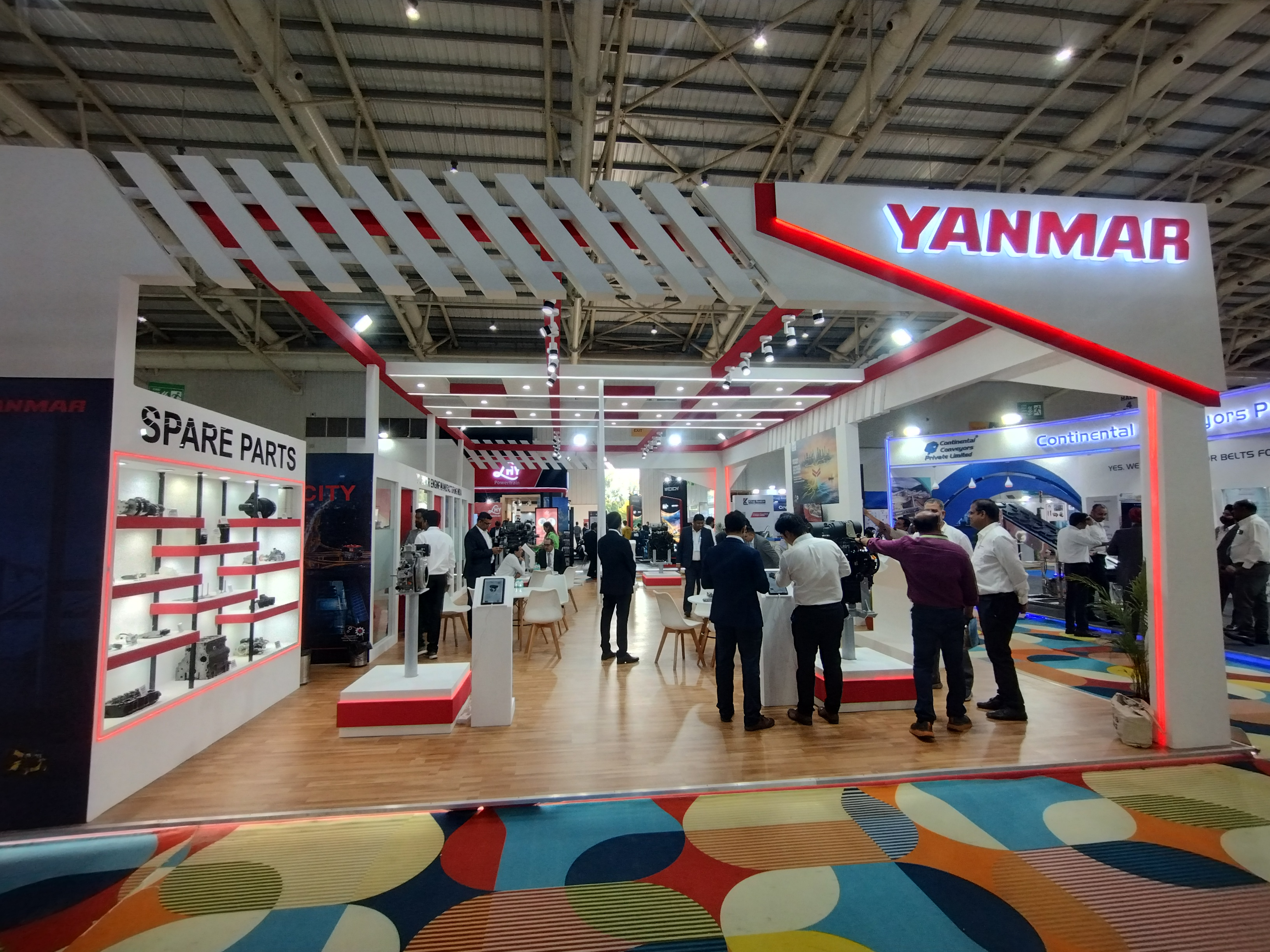
Yanmar at EXCON 2025, BIEC

== Company description ==
Yanmar was founded in March 1912 in Osaka, Japan, by Magokichi Yamaoka.

When the company began in 1912, it manufactured gasoline-powered engines. In 1920 the company began production of a small kerosene engine. In 1933, it launched the world's first practical small diesel engine, the HB model.

In 1961 the agricultural machinery division of the company was started.

Yanmar also started supplying engines to John Deere tractors and for some Thermo King Corporation coolers used in refrigerated trucks and trailers. Within the last 20 years, Yanmar has also established a growing presence in the domestic unmanned aerial vehicle (UAV) market in Japan and elsewhere, with small helicopter UAVs primarily used in agricultural spraying and other forms of aerial application.

As described on the company website, "The name [Yanmar] is a combination of the Yanma Dragonfly (known by names such as Oniyanma and Ginyanma) and the "Yama" from the name of the company founder Magokichi Yamaoka."

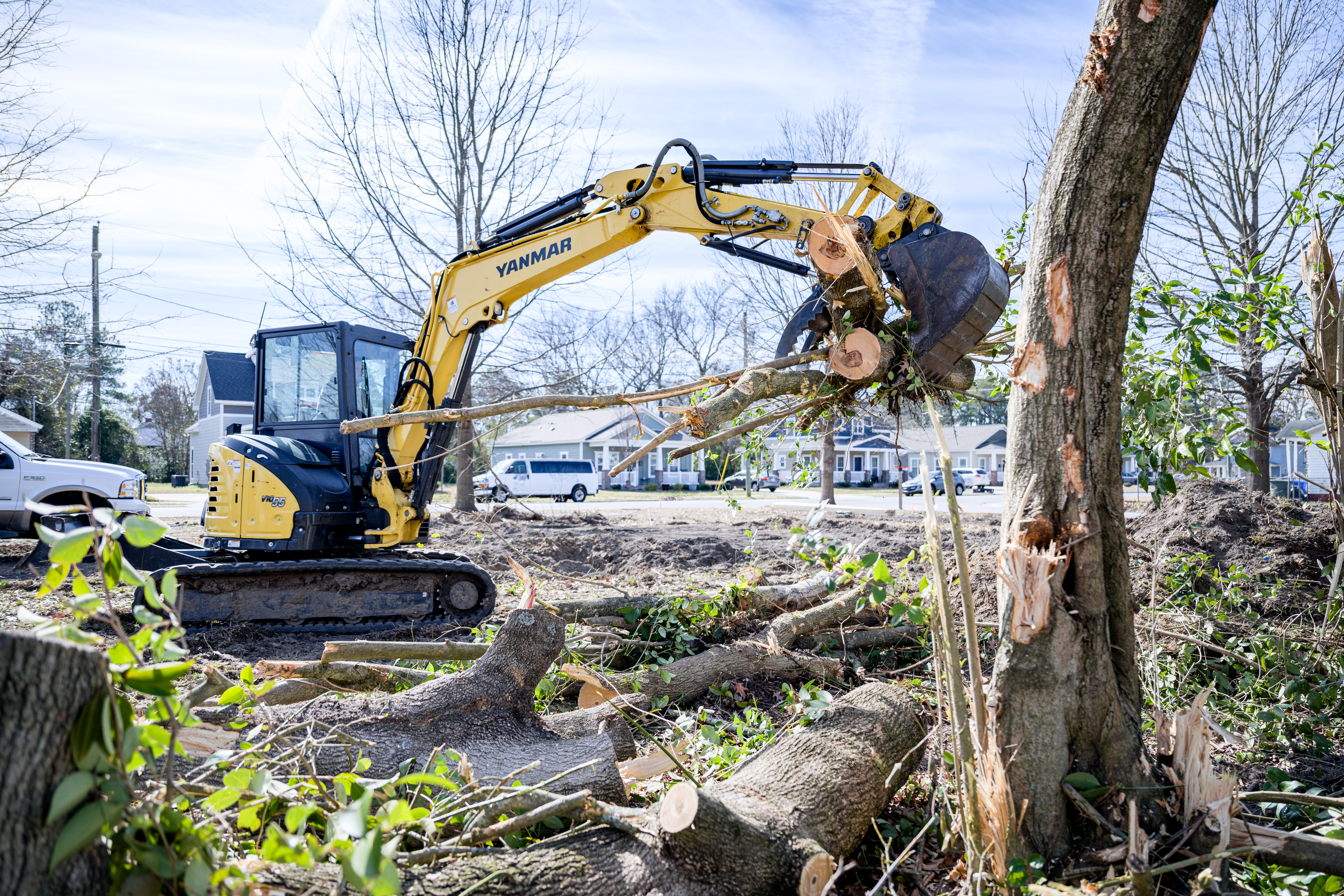
Yanmar Vio55 excavator

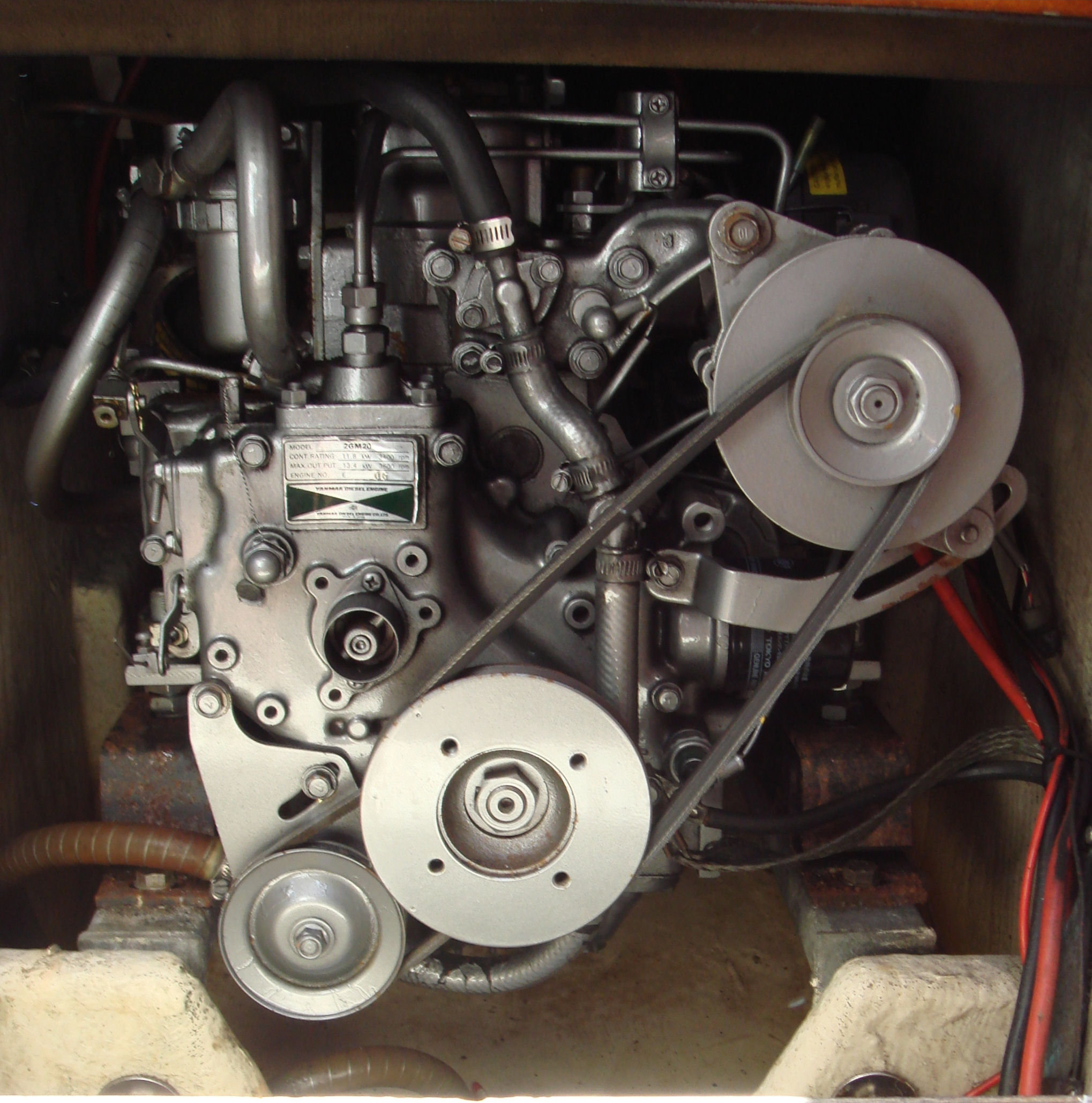
A Yanmar 2GM20 marine diesel engine, installed in a sailboat

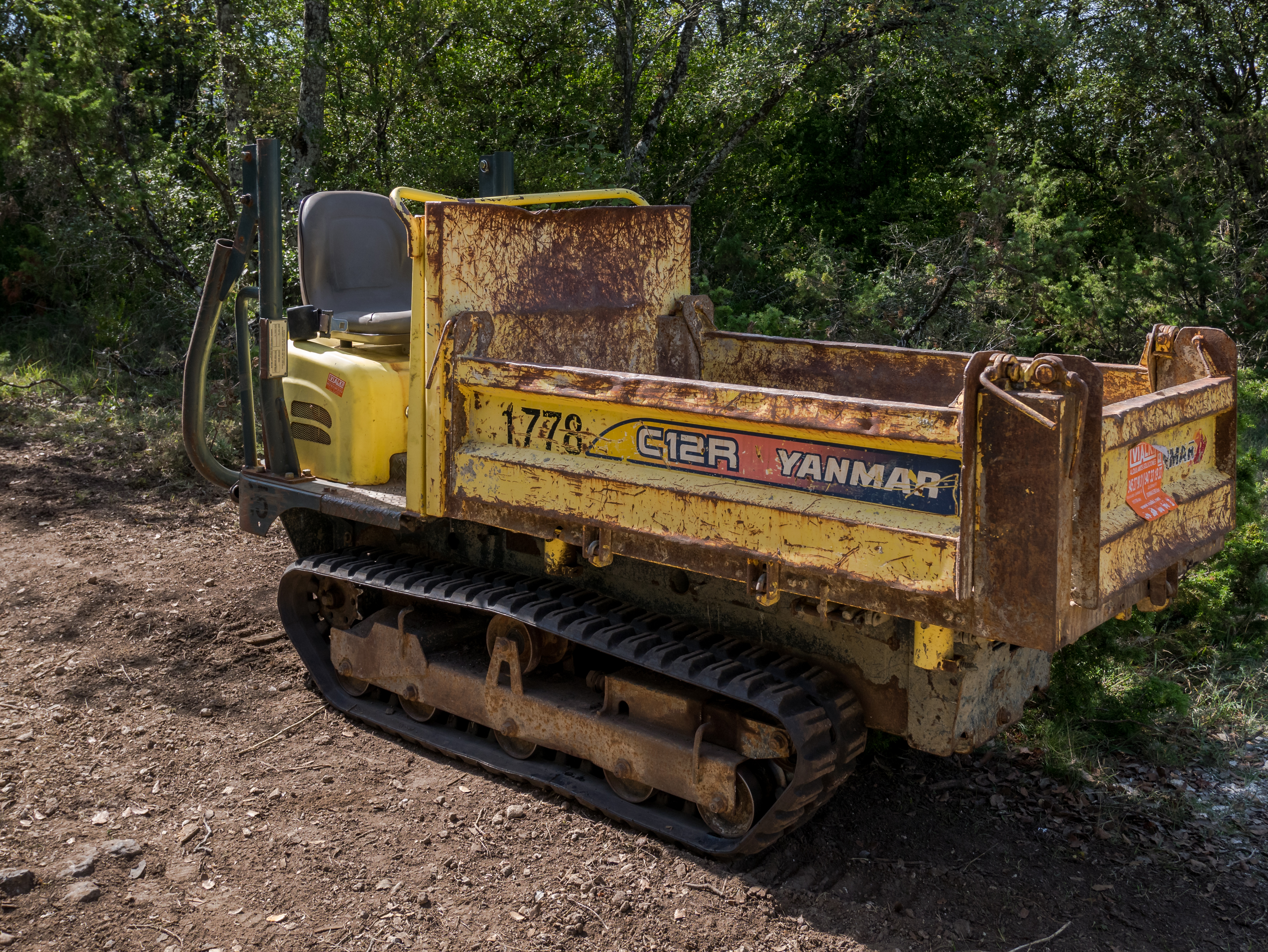
Yanmar tracked dumper

== Timeline ==
- 1912: Yamaoka Magokichi sets up business under the name Yamaoka Hatsudoki Seisakusho (Yamaoka Engine Workshop).
- 1933: Production of world's first practical small diesel.
- 1961: The agricultural machinery division of the company was started
- 1992: The company produces its 10 millionth diesel engine.
- 2015: Yanmar acquires 70% of Spanish generator-set manufacturer HIMOINSA
- 2016: Yanmar increases its stake in the Indian company International Tractors, the maker of Sonalika branded tractors, to 30%. The company also bought German compact equipment maker Schaeff from Terex and forged a partnership with Toyota to develop “next generation hulls” for boats.
- 2019: Yanmar expanded overseas training schools in China, the Philippines, and India.
- 2023: Yanmar produces an original anime project, titled Miru, featuring robots designed by company's designers.
- 2025 Yanmar announces partnership with Sony to develop ship-cleaning drones. The cleaning system intends to improve vessels' fuel efficiency and addresses environmental worries.

== See also ==
- Yanboh and Marboh Weather Forecast
