= Gerhard W. Goetze =

German-born researcher and inventor

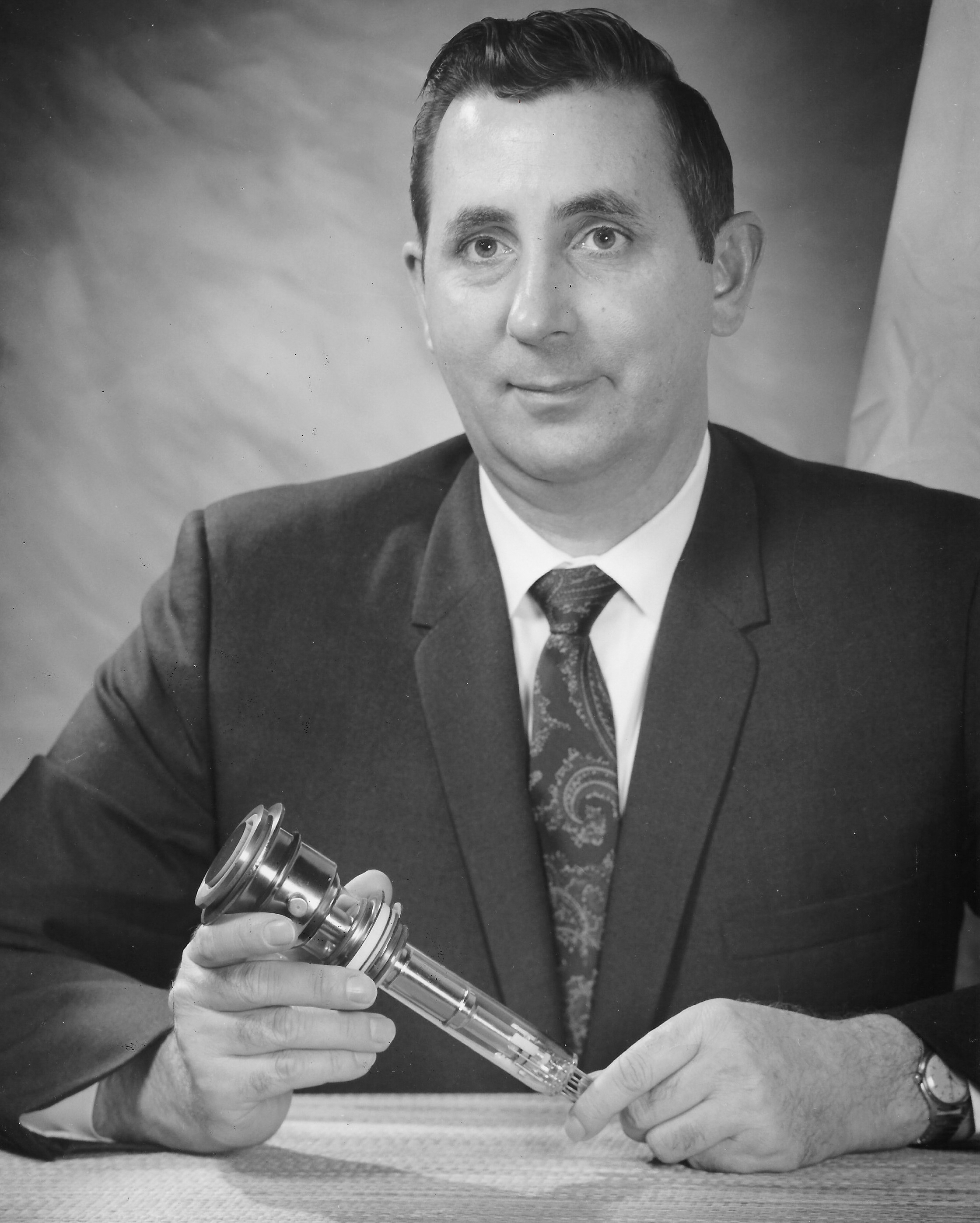
- Goetze with SEC tube for use on Apollo Missions
- Born: Gerhard Wilhelm Goetze; June 19, 1930; Niederdünzebach, Hesse, Germany
- Died: January 17, 2007 (aged 76); Bad Zwesten, Germany
- Occupations: Researcher and inventor

Gerhard Wilhelm Goetze (June 19, 1930 – January 17, 2007) was a German-born Ph.D. researcher and inventor in atomic physics. He was primarily known for his work on the Moon-to-Earth Apollo TV camera making live broadcast in both brilliant sunlight and pitch darkness possible. Goetze discovered the secondary electron conduction (SEC) effect which amplified light through high-speed electrons deposited in thin film storage targets. The SEC tube was additionally used in ground-based astronomy, inspection of integrated circuits, electron-microscope-based biological tissue study, security, and night vision. Goetze received ten patents for his inventions.

The images of the first man on the Moon are recorded through the work of Goetze.

In 1973 Goetze received a Franklin Institute Award, the Longstreth Medal established in 1890, for the conception and development of the SEC tube, which played an important role in television, night surveillance and ultraviolet astronomical observations.

In 1984 Goetze was awarded the Rudolf-Diesel-Medaille, an award by the German Institute for Inventions, for the applications of the secondary electron conduction tube in industry.

== Biography ==
=== Early life and education ===
Gerhard W. Goetze was born in Niederdünzebach near Eschwege, Hessen, Germany on June 19, 1930, to Walter Kurt Götze, a businessman, and Anna Katherine Sieland. He attended the local primary school until his father was transferred to Bartenstein, near Königsberg, East Prussia, Germany to work at the local Volksschule (primary school).

Goetze attended the Volksschule from 1936 to 1944.

Goetze, along with his mother and baby sister, fled Bartenstein, now named Bartoszyce, on the last train on January 22, 1945, during the evacuation of East Prussia. They made their way back to the family home in Niederdünzebach. Gerhard attended the Gymnasium or college preparatory school, the Friedrich-Wilhelm Schule in Eschwege from 1946 to 1949 where he received his Abitur diploma.

From 1949 to 1958 Goetze studied and taught physics at the University of Marburg. In 1951, he became a member of one of the oldest academic fraternities, the German Student Corps, Saxonia, founded in 1886, with the motto In Treue Fest or "In Loyalty Firm".

His concentration in nuclear physics led to his doctoral thesis in Zerfallsschema und Beta-Spektrum des MsTh1 (Ra228) (Disintegration Schematic and Beta Spectrum of Mesothorium) (isotopes of radium). Goetze later found electrons to be more interesting and continued his work in atomic physics.

=== Marriage and children ===
In 1954, Gerhard married Lisa Herta Kohlus of Eschwege. They had five children, two born in the convent of Vincent de Paul in Eschwege, Germany; Regina Karin and Martin Gerhard and three children born in Wilkinsburg, Pennsylvania, US; Frank Walter, Arleen Susan and Thomas Wilhelm. Their marriage ended in divorce.

He had a daughter with his second wife.

=== Emigration to the US ===
Goetze traveled from Germany to New York in January 1959 with his pregnant wife and two children under the sponsorship of the United States Department of the Army in the national interest. They lived for several months in the Alamac Hotel on Broadway and West 71st Street in New York City until employment was found.

In the summer of 1959 the family moved to Monroeville, Pennsylvania, where Goetze worked for the Westinghouse Electric Corporation Research and Development Laboratories in Pittsburgh. His early research on night vision was initially classified for the Department of Defense. It was later declassified by the federal government after use along the South Vietnam frontier and for use by NASA and police anti-crime measures.

In 1964, he moved with his wife and five children to Elmira, New York, to continue his work at the Westinghouse Cathode Ray Tube facility in nearby Horseheads, New York. As operations manager, Goetze grew the department from a team of six to more than 170 scientists and staff. His work through Westinghouse was an integral part of the NASA space program.

Goetze became a US citizen on July 4, 1967, in Ithaca, New York. At that time, he changed his name from Götze to Goetze.

=== Employment at Westinghouse ===
- 1959-1964 – Scientific researcher and senior physicist, Westinghouse Research and Development Laboratories in Pittsburgh, Pennsylvania.
- 1964-1969 – Operations manager of the Image Tube Department at Westinghouse, Horseheads, New York.
- 1969 – Academic sabbatical to attend the Sloan Business School, MIT, Massachusetts, US.
- 1969-1983 – Various positions with Westinghouse International, Frankfurt, Germany with his last position as director of electronic components in Europe.

=== Other positions ===
- 1965-1969 – Named to the Defense Advisory Group on Electronic Devices, Office of the Secretary of Defense.
- 1966 – Senior member of the Institute of Electrical and Electronics Engineers.
- 1970 – Civilian consultant to the Department of Defense as a member of the Advisory Group on Electronic Devices.
- 1970 – Adjunct professor for electrical engineering at University of Rhode Island.
- 1973 – Franklin Institute – elected as a life fellow.

=== Business development in Germany ===
In 1981 Goetze headed Fanal Elektric, an electronic components manufacturer in Germany, who sold 95% of its stock shares to Westinghouse to secure the American Market. In 1989, Goetze along with other investors, purchased Fanal Elektric from Westinghouse and grew Fanal with 3 other firms; Hundt & Weber, Maihak Aktiengesellschaft and Fanalmatic GmbH into an international company under Goetze and Scheffler Group, GmbH. His firms employed over 1,000 people. The Goetze and Scheffler Group suffered a severe decline in sales with the financial catastrophe of Westinghouse Electric Corporation in the 1990s. The G&S Group ultimately closed as a business.

=== Personal life and soaring ===
Goetze's passion in life was for gliding. He began his interest at the Blaue Kuppe in the countryside of the Werra-Meißner area. Goetze was one of the early members (1964) of the Eschwege Luftsportverrein (local glider soaring club).

While living in Elmira, New York, Goetze spent many weekends with his family at the Harris Hill Soaring Club pursuing his hobby as a sailplane pilot. In 1969 Goetze traveled to Pikes Peak near Colorado Springs, Colorado for the final qualifying test for the prestigious 3 Diamond Badge in gliding from the FAI Gliding Commission. His airplane towed him to 2,000 feet above ground level and from there using only airwave lift, soared to an altitude of 28,000 feet (8,500 meters).)

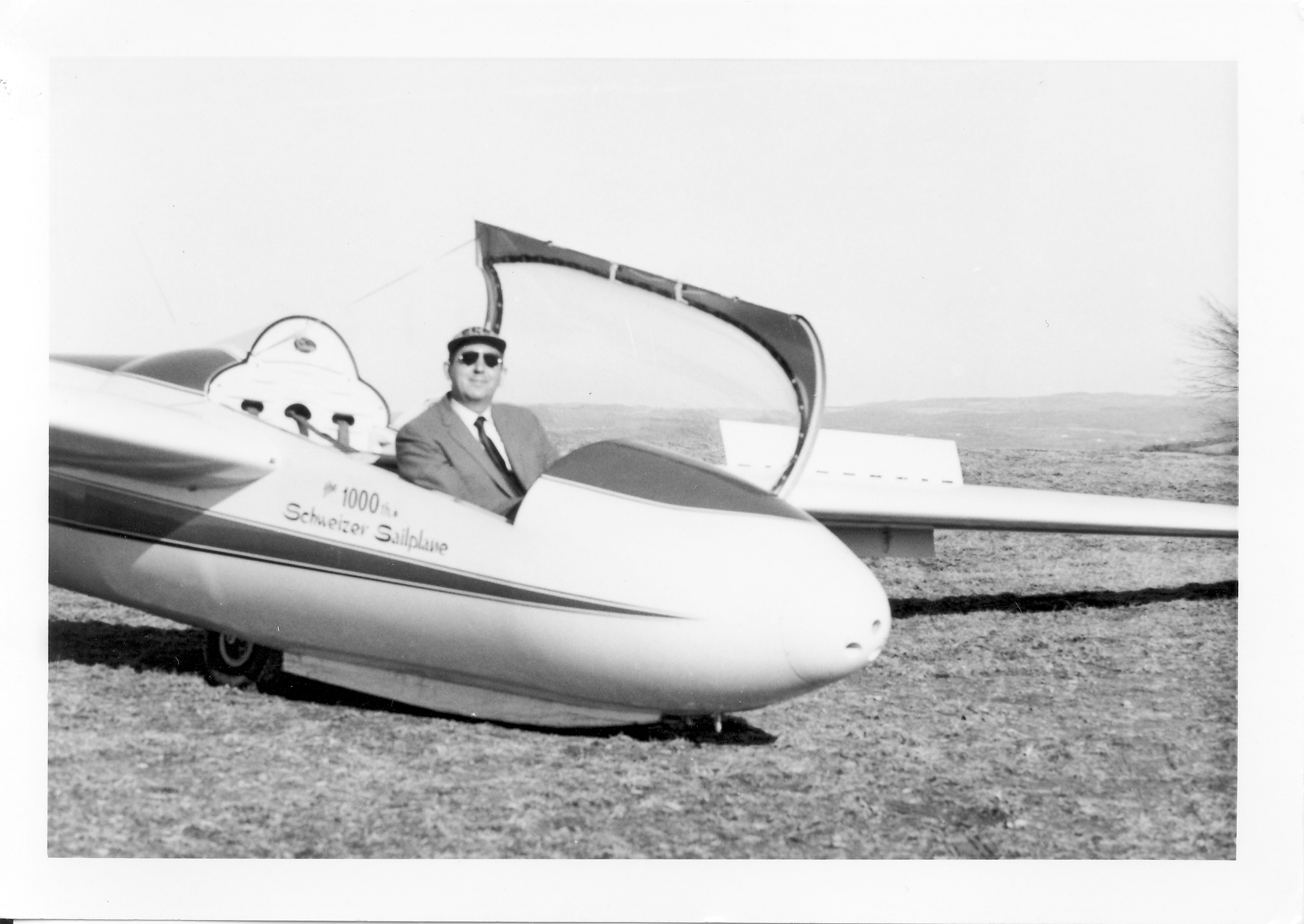
Goetze in a Schweizer sailplane

Goetze was a long-time member of the Soaring Society of America (SSA).

Goetze was also a commercial pilot.

He continued his joy for flying his entire life. His last aircraft, a 1960 single engine Cessna 182 Skylane was flown in 2007 after his death by his two sons, Frank, senior pilot for FedEx and Thomas, mechanical engineer, across the Atlantic Ocean over 10 days and 40 flight hours from Kassel Airport, Germany to Beaver County Airport, Pennsylvania via Denmark, Norway, the Faroe Islands, Iceland, Greenland and Canada.

=== Death ===
Goetze died on January 17, 2007, in Bad Zwesten, Germany at the age of 76 after suffering a severe stroke a month earlier.

He is buried in the local cemetery in his home village in Niederdünzebach (Eschwege), Germany.

== Scientific career, Westinghouse and Department of Defense ==
In October 1960 at the Fifth International Congress on High Speed Photography, A. Anderson, manager of the applied physics department of Westinghouse Research Laboratories stated that, "a new electronic tube, so sensitive it can 'see' individual particles of light, has enabled Westinghouse scientists to photograph the faint tracks of cosmic ray as they move through solid crystal at speeds near the velocity of light." The Astracon, light amplifier tube, was brought to practical application by Goetze. His research was supported in part by the United States Atomic Energy Commission and the United States Army Corps of Engineers.

In the early 1960s in the Pittsburgh research laboratories the SEC (secondary electron conduction) effect was discovered by Goetze. This was developed for the Department of Defense (DoD) for Night vision in Vietnam. It had the capability to produce clear images in motion at low light levels without motion distortion.

The SEC tube had DoD highly top secret security classification but was the only device that could meet the Apollo camera mission requirements to operate in both lunar day and night. The DoD was asked to allow Westinghouse the use of the SEC tube for the Apollo TV Camera program. The task to develop this unique SEC tube was headed by Goetze at the Westinghouse Tube Division in Elmira, New York.

The SEC tube was used to build a camera to transmit live images from the Moon to Earth on Apollo 11. The tube was also employed in science in electron microscope biological tissue study; ground-based astronomy, material testing and inspection of integral circuits in industry, and security and police.

The SEC tube was used on the Orbiting Astronomical Observatory as the main sensor, on Apollo 9, 10, 11, 12, and 13, in the ATM Satellites as well as the OSO-H and SAS-D space projects.

The Apollo 12 lunar camera sustained damage when it was inadvertently pointed directly towards the Sun damaging its sensor.

In 1969 Westinghouse was awarded the contract for the TV image tube for the Viking program of 1972. Goetze oversaw the development of the Mars camera.

The SEC tube was awarded the "Most Meritorious Patent Award" at Westinghouse.

=== Lunar Camera Tube Program chronology ===
- September 1963 – First contact with NASA/Houston and Grumman Aircraft to propose use of SEC tube for television transmission from LEM
- May 1964- Formal proposal for a lunar Television Camera made to the Manned Spacecraft Center, Houston, by the Westinghouse Aerospace and Electronic Tube Division
- September 1964 - Camera tube contract let by NASA
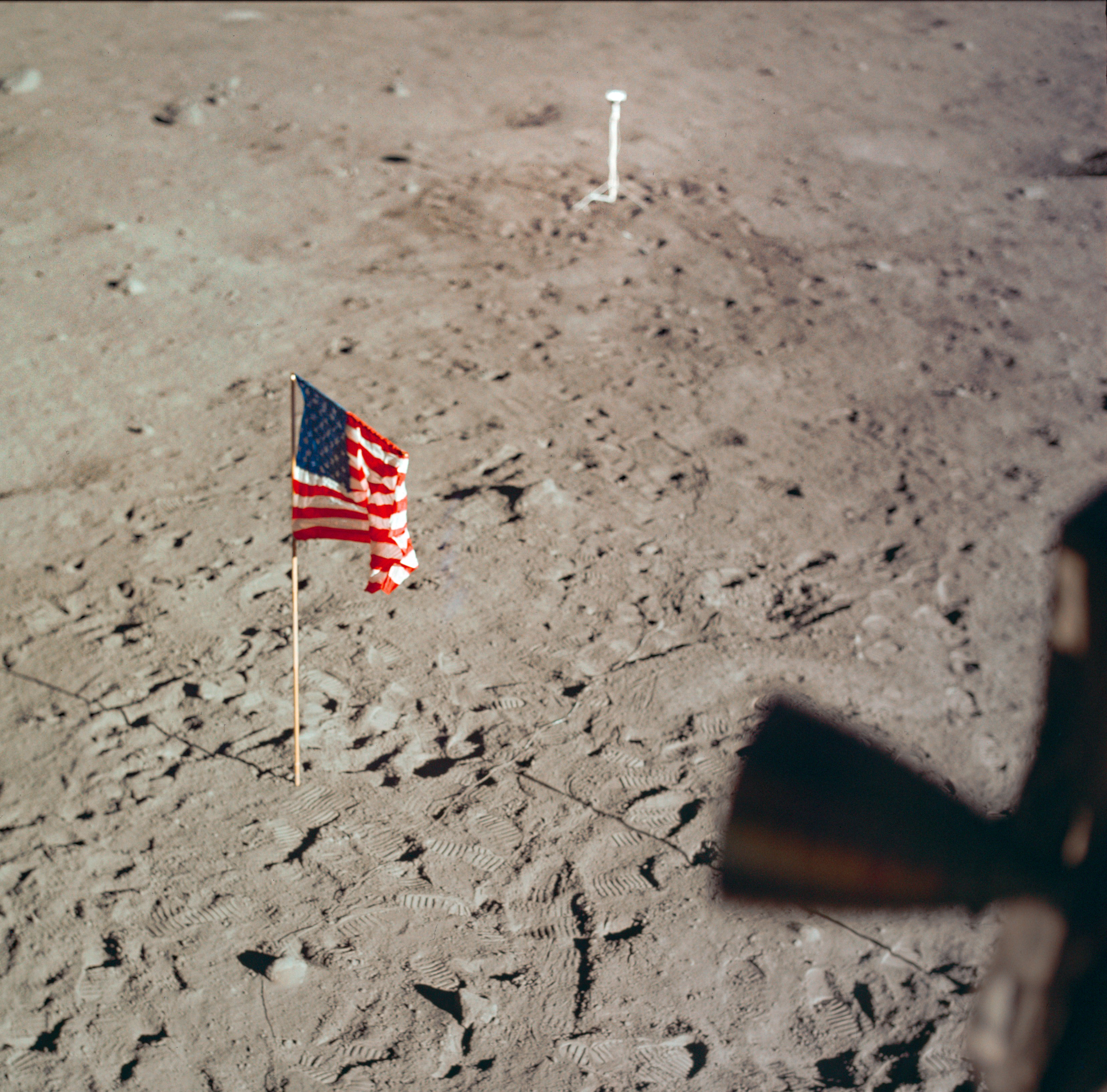
  Lunar camera used to transmit live pictures to Earth and US flag as seen from the Apollo 11 Lunar Module Eagle
- September 1964 - First tube start with high-power heater (WX-30293)
- September 1964 - First tube start with low-power heater (WX-31034)
- May 1965 – First flight candidate delivered to Westinghouse Aerospace Division
- July 1966 – First start on the Lunar Camera Tube Program
- May 1969 - Apollo 10 crew send first color television pictures from outer space to Earth
- July 1969 – Television pictures of man's first steps on the Moon. Through joint efforts, one quarter of the population of the Earth was able to see the first steps of the first men on the Moon. Life magazine estimated that 600 million people watched the first step on the Moon by Armstrong. "People from 47 countries watched the astronauts ... Images of the flag-planting ceremony passed through the fixed-focus lens of the camera, were transformed into electrical impulses, amplified a hundred times and beamed directly to earth."
- The WX-31034 Lunar Camera Tube remains at Tranquility Base on Mare Tranquillitatis (Sea of Tranquility) on the Moon's surface.

=== Patents ===
- 3,735,032 – Television Pick-Up Tube Device
- 3,657,596 – Electronic Image Device Having Target Comprising Porous Region Adjacent Conductive Layer and Outer, Denser Region
- 3,560,792 – Apparatus for Observing Display Screens of Instruments Using Particle Beams
- 3,441,787 – Secondary Storage Electron Conduction Storage System
- 3,408,531 – Storage System
- 3,405,309 – Radiation Detection System
- 3,254,252 – Image Device
- 3,213,316 – Tube with Highly Porous Target
- 3,155,860 - Continuously Variable Permanent Magnet for Imaging Purposes
- 3,128,406 - Radiation Image Pickup Tube
- 2,845,900.9 – Contacts for Electrical Heavy Current Switches (German Patent)

== Awards and honors ==
- 1966 – Goetze's lunar camera tube was named one of the 100 most outstanding scientific and technical achievements by Industrial Research Magazine
- 1969 – Received his Diamond C International Award from the Soaring Society of America (SSA).
- 1973 – Franklin Institute Award, Longstreth Medal for the conception and development of the secondary electron conduction Tube.
- 1984 – Rudolf Diesel Medal Award

== Publications ==
- G. Goetze and H. Kanter, A High Gain Image Intensifier System with Fast Shutter Action for Application in High Energy Physics, Nuclear Instruments and Methods, Journal on Accelerators, Instrumentation and Techniques in Nuclear Physics, K.Sigbahn-Uppsala, Editor, March 1961, pp 224 – 228.
- E.J. Sternglass and G.W. Goetze, Westinghouse Research Laboratories, Field-Enhanced Transmission Secondary Emission for High-Speed Counting, IRE Transactions on Nuclear Science, Volume NS-, Number 3, June 1962, Proceedings of the Eighth Scintillation Counter Symposium, Washington, DC March 1–3, 1962, Published by the Professional Group on Nuclear Science.
- A.E.Sanderson, G.W. Goetze, and H. Kanter, The Astracon Tube and Its Application to High-Speed Photography, High Speed Photography, Fifth International Congress, J.S. Courtney-Pratt, B.E., Editor, Society of Motion Picture and Television Engineers, New York, New York, 1962, Section C-1, pp. 95–97.
- G.W. Goetze, A. H. Boerio and H. Shabanowitz, Applied Research on SEC Amplification Camera Tube, an unclassified document released by the Air Force Avionics Laboratory, 1963.
- R.R. Collins, R.R. Beyer, J.S.Kalafut and G.W. Goetze, A Family of Multi-stage Direct-view Image Intensifiers with Fiber-optic Coupling, Advances in Electronics and Electron Physics, Edited by L. Marton, Volume 28A, Academic Press, New York and London, 1969, Fourth Symposium at Imperial College, London, Photo-Electronic Image Devices September 16–20, 1968, pp. 105–118
- G.W.Goetze and A.H.Boerio, SEC Camera-tube Performance Characteristics and Applications, Advances in Electronics and Electron Physics, Edited by L. Marton, Volume 28A, Academic Press, New York and London, 1969, Fourth Symposium at Imperial College, London, Photo-Electronic Image Devices September 16–20, 1968, pp. 159–171
- A. Choudry, G.W.Goetze, S. Nudelman and T.Y. Shen, Photoelectronic Image Recording Device Optimized for High Detective Quantum Efficiency, Advances in Electronics and Electron Physics, Edited by L. Marton, Volume 28B, Academic Press, New York and London, 1969, Fourth Symposium at Imperial College, London, Photo-Electronic Image Devices September 16–20, 1968, pp 903–910
- G. W. Goetze and A. B. Laponsky, Camera Tubes Employing High-Gain Electron-Imaging Charge-Storage Targets, Photoelectronic Imaging Devices, Devices and Their Evaluation, Volume 2, Edited by Lucien M. Biberman and Sol Nudelman, Chapter 11, Plenum Press, New York, 1971
- G. W. Goetze and A. B. Laponsky, Early Stages in the Development of Camera Tubes Employing the Silicon-Diode Array as an Electron Charge Storage Target, Photoelectronic Imaging Devices, Devices and Their Evaluation, Volume 2, Edited by Lucien M. Biberman and Sol Nudelman, Chapter 12, Plenum Press, New York, 1971
- G. W. Goetze and A. B. Laponsky, Camera Tubes Employing High-Gain Electron-Imaging Charge-Storage Targets, Photoelectronic Imaging Devices, Devices and Their Evaluation, Volume 2, Edited by Lucien M. Biberman and Sol Nudelman, Chapter 11, pp 217–251, Plenum Press, New York, 1971
- G. W. Goetze and A. B. Laponsky, Early Stages in the Development of Camera Tubes Employing the Silicon Diode Array as an Electron-Imaging Storage Target, Photoelectronic Imaging Devices, Devices and Their Evaluation, Volume 2, Edited by Lucien M. Biberman and Sol Nudelman–Chapter 12, pp 253–262, Plenum Press, New York, 1971
- A. Choudry, G. Goetze, S. Nudelman, Electronic Plate Image Recording Device, Fifth Symposium on Photoelectronic Image Devices, Imperial College, London, England, September 13–17, 1971, Abstracts and Information, pp 97–102, University of Rhode Island and Westinghouse Electronic Tube Division, Elmira, New York.
- A. Choudry, G.W.Goetze, S. Nudelman and T.Y. Shen, Photoelectronic Image Recording Device Optimized for High Detective Quantum Efficiency Advances in Electronics and Electron Physics, Edited by L. Marton, Volume 33B, Academic Press, New York and London, 1972, Fifth Symposium at Imperial College, London, Photo-Electronic Image Devices September 13–17, 1971, pp 903–910
- E. Fenner, H. Heinrich and S. Schweda with Siemans, Germany and G.W.Goetze and R.R. Beyer with Westinghouse Electronic Tube Division, USA, X-Ray Camera Tube with SEC Target, Advances in Electronics and Electron Physics, Edited by L. Marton, Volume 33B, Academic Press, New York and London, 1972, Fifth Symposium at Imperial College, London, Photo-Electronic Image Devices September 13–17, 1971, pp 1061–1067.
- A. B. Laponski, D. D. Doughty, M. Green and G. W. Goetze, Television Camera Tubes and Direct View Intensifiers for Low Light Level Imaging with Ultraviolet, Visible and Infra-Red Radiation, Optik, Zeitschrift für Licht und Elektronenoptik, Band 40, Heft 4, Juli 1974, Stuttgart, Germany, pp 381– 399.
