= Magokichi Yamaoka =

Japanese businessman (1888–1962)

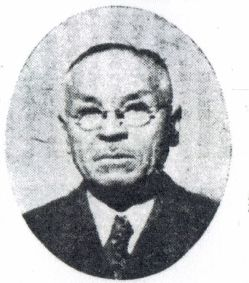
- Born: March 22, 1888
- Died: March 8, 1962 (aged 73)
- Other names: Entrepreneur
- Known for: Founding Yanmar

Magokichi Yamaoka (山岡孫吉, Yamaoka Magokichi) March 22, 1888 – March 8, 1962) was a Japanese entrepreneur.

Magokichi Yamaoka, who established the engineering firm Yanmar in 1912. Prior to World War II, he pursued studies in Munich and developed an interest in Rudolf Diesel, which led him to make frequent visits to Augsburg for research purposes. Following the war, upon returning to his company, he initiated the creation of the Memorial Grove in Wittelsbacher Park. In 1955, he received the prestigious Rudolf Diesel Medal. His efforts also resulted in the Japanese cities of Amagasaki and Nagahama, home to his company's production sites, being designated as official sister cities of Augsburg in 1959.
