= Richard Vetter =

German inventor

- Born: 11 September 1919
- Died: 19 April 2000 (aged 80)
- Occupation: Inventor

Richard Vetter (11 September 1919 – 19 April 2000) was a German inventor from Peine.

== Life and career ==
The idea of the trained master miller goes back, among other things, to the full condensing boiler ("Vetter furnace"), which increases efficiency by cooling the combustion gases and enables the use of simple plastic pipes for exhaust gas discharge. In contrast to conventional condensing boilers, the Vetter furnace is not limited to heating with low system temperatures (e.g. surface heating) and has a special desulphurisation device.

The environmentally friendly stove was torpedoed for years by TÜV, chimney sweep associations and the Federal Environment Agency. One point of criticism was the cooling of the exhaust gases claimed by Vetter to temperatures that a plastic exhaust pipe made possible. A plastic exhaust pipe was almost unthinkable at the time. Vetter invested more than six years and more than 5 million DM in the development process. In 1977, a bread factory he ran burned down. The majority of the insurance sum paid out at the time provided the financial basis for the development of the stove. In 1985, the television magazine Panorama reported on the inventor's disputes with TÜV Hannover, whose employees, in the presence of the cameramen, were unable to reproduce the alleged inadmissible exhaust gas temperatures.

In 1986, Vetter sold his technical process to a Swiss company after the TÜV had declared the furnace to be fundamentally permissible, but continued to object to numerous details, so that no German manufacturer could be found for production. Vetter only received a general building permit twelve years after the application was made.

== Awards and honors ==
Vetter was awarded the Rudolf-Diesel-Medaille in 1986. In 1987, he received the environmental protection award.
