= Jürgen Schade =

Dr. Jürgen Schade (born in Berlin, Germany, 3 December 1942) was president of the Deutsches Patent- und Markenamt (DPMA) (English: German Patent and Trade Mark Office) for 7 years, from 2001 to 31 December 2008. He studied theology and obtained a PhD in law, before starting to work in 1977 at the Deutsches Patent- und Markenamt.

Preceded by ?	President of the Deutsches Patent- und Markenamt (German Patent and Trade Mark Office); 2001–2008	Succeeded by Cornelia Rudloff-Schäffer
