= Yanboh and Marboh Weather Forecast =

Japanese weather insert

- ヤン坊マー坊天気予報
- Genre: Weather
- Created by: Yasuo Nakamura
- Opening theme: Yanboh & Marboh (1959, 1964 – 2014)
- Country of origin: Japan
- Original language: Japanese
- No. of episodes: 12 (segments)

Production
- Producer: Yanmar
- Animator: Yasuo Nakamura

Original release
- Release: June 1, 1959 – March 31, 2014

Yanboh and Marboh Weather Forecast (ヤン坊マー坊天気予報, Yanbō to mābo tenkiyohō) was a Japanese weather insert sponsored by Yanmar and broadcast from June 1, 1959 to March 31, 2014 on local affiliates of the Japanese networks, mostly during the evening news.

There was also a companion weather website with data provided by Weathernews Inc., but it was discontinued on June 30, 2013, before the TV bulletin ended.

== History and overview ==
The program was first broadcast on June 1, 1959 (Weather Day) and introduced the company's mascots Yanboh and Marboh. The characters were created by animator Yasuo Nakamura.

In 1969, coverage of the bulletin increased to all prefectures.

After a string of stations ceased carrying the bulletin in 2013, the thirteen stations who still carried it announced that the Yanmar-sponsored weather forecast was set to be withdrawn on March 31, 2014, after nearly 55 years on air. Yanmar announced that its discontinuation was due to "changes in the media environment" that affected the quality of weather forecasting, causing its end.

== Segments ==
- Yanboh and Marboh (1959) first Yanboh and Marboh commercial
- Yanboh and Marboh (1964) Commercial for the 1964 Olympics
- Yanboh and Marboh (1968) first Commercial in color
- Yanboh and Marboh (1974) partially found commercial
- Yanboh and Marboh (1983) first segment for the weather insert
- Yanboh and Marboh (2014) last segment
