= German Patent and Trade Mark Office =

German national patent office

- Deutsches Patent- und Markenamt
- Abbreviation: DPMA
- Formation: 1 July 1877
- Type: Federal agency
- Purpose: The central authority in the field of industrial property protection in Germany
- Headquarters: Munich
- Coordinates: 48°07′55″N 11°35′00″E
- President: Eva Schewior
- Parent organization: Federal Ministry of Justice and Consumer Protection
- Staff: 2600
- Website: www.dpma.de
- Formerly called: Kaiserliches Patentamt; Reichspatentamt; Deutsches Patentamt

The German Patent and Trade Mark Office (German: Deutsches Patent- und Markenamt; abbreviation: DPMA) is the German national patent office, with headquarters in Munich, and offices in Berlin and Jena. In 2006 it employed 2556 people, of whom about 700 were patent examiners.

== Function and status ==
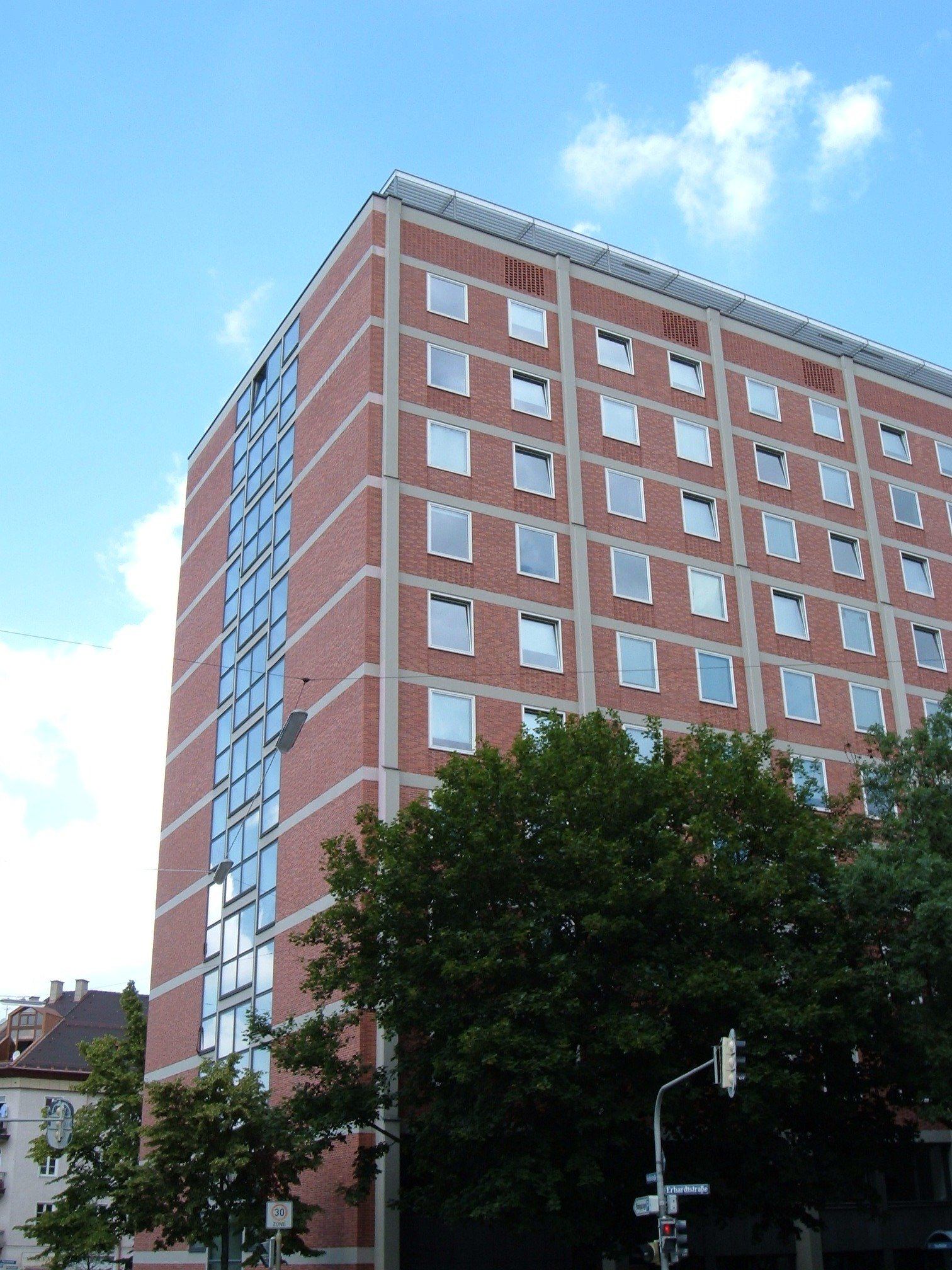
Premises of the DPMA on Zweibrückenstraße, Munich, next to the headquarters of the European Patent Office (not visible, see image below)

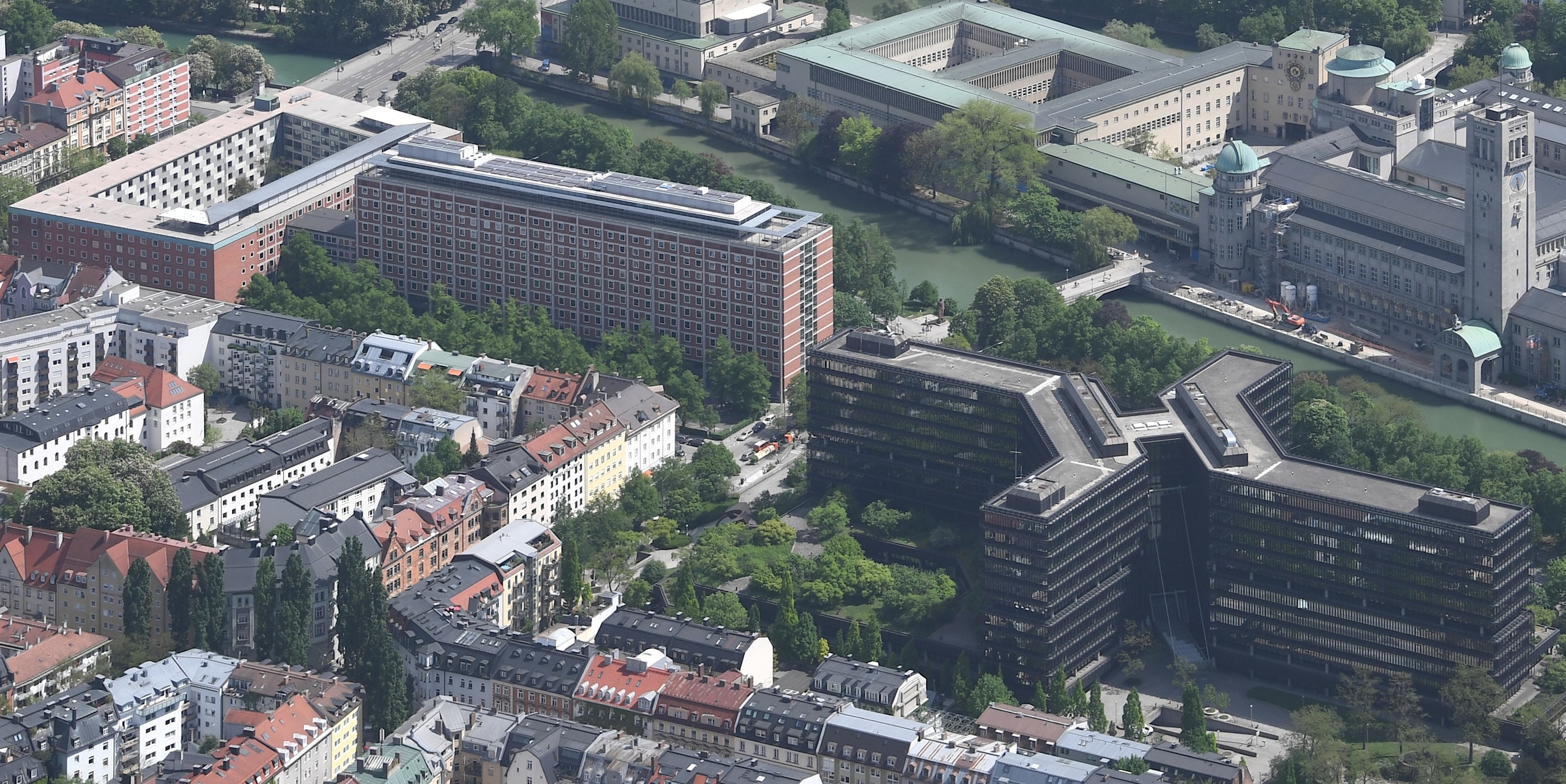
Aerial image of the DPMA at Zweibrückenstraße, comprising the square-shaped and the long reddish building in the upper left part of the image. Right below it is the dark-coloured headquarters of the European Patent Office; above in the background lies the science museum Deutsches Museum on the other side of the river Isar.

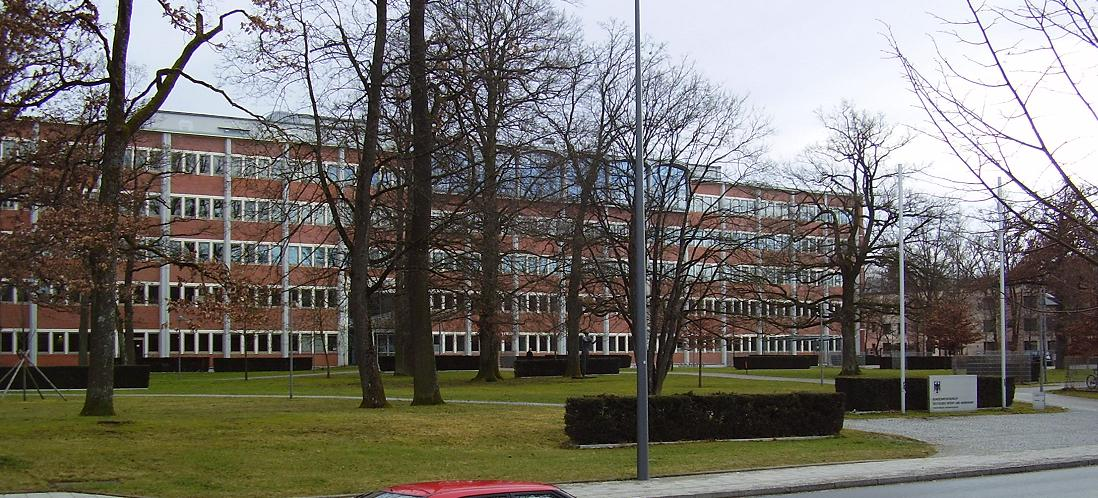
Cincinnatistraße branch, Munich

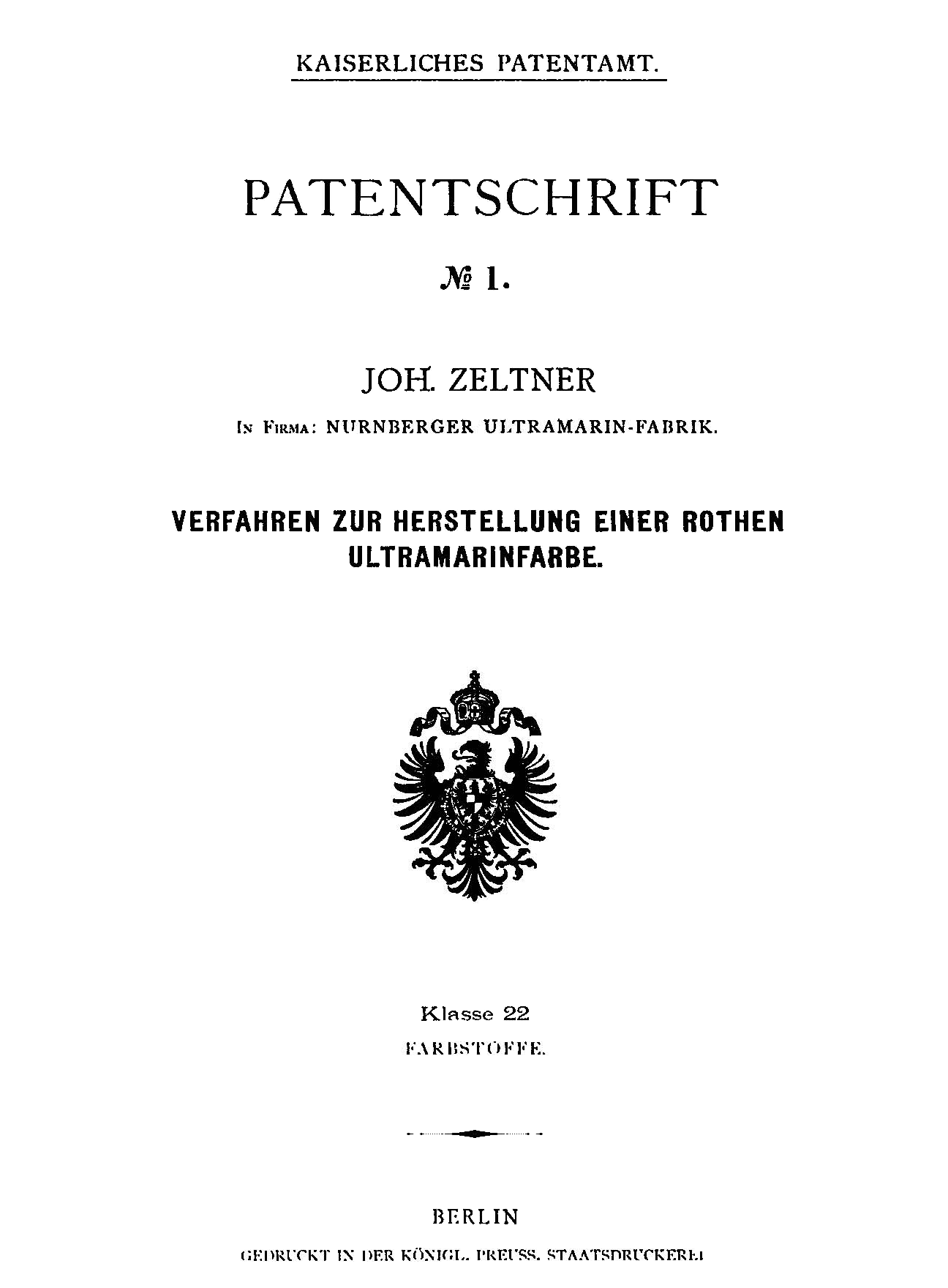
Cover of the first German patent

The DPMA is the central authority in the field of intellectual property protection in Germany. Its responsibilities include the granting of patents for the registration of industrial designs, trademarks and designs, as well as informing the public about existing industrial property rights. A recognised partner of the DPMA is the Patentinformationszentrum (Patent Information Centre), united in the Deutscher Patentinformationszentren e.V (German Patent Information Centres Association).

The legal basis of the German Patent and Trademark Office is § 26 of the Patentgesetz (German Patents Act).

== History ==
Before 1877, patent protection in the German states rested on separate laws and administrative procedures, with no single system shared across the future empire. The first unified German Patent Act, passed on 25 May 1877, replaced that patchwork with a common legal framework for the empire and created a central authority responsible for examining applications and granting patents. That authority, the Kaiserliches Patentamt (Imperial Patent Office), opened in Berlin on 1 July 1877, the date from which applications under the new Reich-wide system could first be filed. The application for German patent no. 1 was filed the day after by Johann Zeltner, for a method of producing red ultramarine colour.

The Chairman of the newly established office was Karl Rudolf Jacobi. The first trademark registration was on 16 October 1894 for a Berlin lamp producer.

In 1905, the Patent Office moved into premises designed by the architects Solf and Wichards on the corner of Gitschiner Straße and Lindenstraße in Kreuzberg, with a characteristic 243-metre front on the elevated highway.

In 1919, the Patent Office was renamed the Reichspatentamt (State Patent Office).

The Nazi anti-Semitic and anti-foreigner laws strangled scientific output and patent applications. Almost as soon as they came to power, the Nazis moved to throw the Jews out of the German Patent Offices, with only a few exceptions for those who had served at the front during World War I or who had lost a parent or son in fighting. "Law Relating to the Admission to the Profession of Patent-agent and Lawyer of 22 April 1933. The Government of the Reich has resolved the following law which is promulgated herewith: Section 1. Patent-agents which are of non-Aryan descent pursuant to the law relating to the reestablishment of the Professional Civil Service of 7 April 1933 may be taken off the roster of patent-agents kept by the Reich Patent Office up to 30 September 1933…"

In 1938, the "Aryanization" of patents was mandated, in that new patents could only be proposed and submitted if sponsored by an Aryan German citizen, and not by dissidents, foreigners or Jews. Existing patents held by Jews also had to be turned over to a German citizen. As one author stated, "Jewish commercial firms and the associated property, as well as wholesale operations and industry that are Jewish because of the degree to which they are under Jewish ownership, can be de-Jewdified [sic]. Important patents and commercial secrets must be transferred to non-Jewish control."

The Reich Patent Office came under Nazi political party pressure as well. One of Adolf Hitler's chauffeurs, Anton Loibl, invented the idea of attaching small pieces of glass that would reflect the lights of approaching cars to the pedals of bicycles. In 1936, word of this invention came to the SS, and they decided to form a partnership with Loibl to market his idea. However, the idea was not all that novel, and a similar safety device had already been applied for as a patent. "But this competitor lacked something very important- the SS as a business partner. His patent application was buried. Loibl's sailed through, and in 1938 Heinrich Himmler used his supreme authority as head of the German police to pass a new traffic law. This required all German bicycles to be equipped with Loibl's reflective pedal… in 1938 alone, the SS received a tidy 77,740 reichsmarks from the bicycle pedal proceeds."

In the last months of the war, many of the technical records of the German Patent Office were widely dispersed throughout Germany to preserve them from the Allied firebombing of Berlin. "One set of copies of the pending 180,000 patent applications were taken into eastern Germany where they were later lost by fire. The technical library of 300,000 volumes and the records of the secret patents were moved to Heringen, near Kassel, and 3,000 valuable reference books were sent through Czechoslovakia to Bavaria. Part of the Trademark records were moved to another building in Berlin where they were lost also by fire. Some of the technical personnel remained at the Patent Office in Berlin, some went to Heringen and others were scattered throughout Germany. The Patent Office building in Berlin was about one-third destroyed by a heavy bombing attack on 5 February 1945. US and British representatives reached Heringen in May 1945 and found some 50 former patent employees at work restoring and re-classifying the patent indexes and examination material. The library and the register of secret patents were located in a potash mine in Heringen. However, the files of the secret applications and patents had been burned upon orders of the German government shortly before the arrival of the US troops… The technical library has been moved from the potash mine in Heringen and is again available to the public. The library is equipped with 12 miles of new metal shelves which provide space for about 500,000 volumes."

Another attempt to preserve German patents was the re-registration of the patents in other countries. In 1945, it was noted that “Patents Transferred. That Germany is preparing in other ways to salve what she can is indicated by reports that the flight of capital on a large scale is taking place from Germany to Sweden through the transfer of German patents. The Swedish Patent Office is said to be inundated with registrations of patents on behalf of German individuals, commercial corporations and research organizations. Last year, it is said, 60 per cent of the record total of 10,000 patent registrations were German and the proportion has increased this year. Among those who registered were I.G. Farben, the Steyr-Daimler-Benz automobile manufacturers, the Siemens and A.E.G. Combines. The patents, of course, represent substantial assets."

After the Second World War, the patent office property was seized by the Allied Control Council, including patents, trademarks, and emblems, under Articles II and X of the Allied Control Council Law No. 5, 30 October 1945. Article II of this Act on 31 August 1951 set aside all Allied Control Council Law, but in fact this occurred only on 12 September 1990 with the "Treaty on the Final Settlement with Respect to Germany". Until 1951 the seized patents were used by the Allies technologically and economically.

On 1 October 1949, the Deutsches Patentamt (German Patent Office) moved to premises in the Deutsches Museum in Munich. In 1951 a branch office was opened in the old Reichspatentamt in Berlin. In 1959, the Patent Office moved into its own building in Munich.

In 1990, the Amt für Erfindungs- und Patentwesen der DDR (Inventions and Patent Office of the GDR) merged with the Patent Office.

In 1998, an office in Jena was built and the bulk of the Berlin office moved there. The Office now has three locations: Munich, Jena and Berlin. In the same year, the Deutsches Patentamt was renamed Deutsches Patent- und Markenamt (DPMA), in order to take the importance of brands as a working area of the office into account.

Originally, appeals against decisions of the Office were handled internally; however, since 1961 they have been handled by the Bundespatentgericht (Federal Patent Court).

Since 1978 and the entry into force of the European Patent Convention, the European Patent Office also issues patents effective in Germany, as part of a European patent's "bundle" of national patents.

Presidents of the Deutsches Patent- und Markenamt
Name	Dates of Presidency
...	...
Kurt Haertel	1963 – 1975
Erich Häusser	1976 – 1995
Norbert Haugg	August 1, 1995 – January 31, 2000
Jürgen Schade	2001 – December 31, 2008
Cornelia Rudloff-Schäffer	January 1, 2009 – January 2023
Eva Schewior	February 2023 –

== Patent applicants ==
In 2006, the leaders in terms of numbers of patents at the DPMA were Siemens, with 2501 patents, Bosch, with 2202 patents, DaimlerChrysler with 1626 patents.

=== Inventors gallery ===
In 1984, the DPMA opened an "inventor's gallery", as "an incentive for all innovative forces to express themselves more, and a signal to the insurance companies to promote them long term." It was enlarged in 1987 and again in 1999 and now covers 17 German inventors: Béla Barényi, Gerd Binnig, Ludwig Bölkow, Walter Bruch, Jürgen Dethloff, Artur Fischer, Rudolf Hell, Heinz Lindenmeier, Hermann Oberth, Hans Joachim Pabst von Ohain, Oskar-Erich Peter, Hans-Jürgen Quadbeck-Seeger, Ernst Ruska, Hans Sauer, Felix Wankel, Ernst-Ludwig Winnacker, Konrad Zuse

== See also ==
- Auslegeschrift
- Bundespatentgericht
- Gebrauchsmuster
- Geschmacksmuster
- German Association for the Protection of Intellectual Property (GRUR e. V.)
- German patent law
- Ralf Sieckmann v Deutsches Patent und Markenamt
