= Arab Society for Intellectual Property =

The Arab Society for Intellectual Property (ASIP) is a non-profit organization based in Munich established on February 23, 1987, with the purpose of enhancing and developing the protection of the Intellectual Property (IP) system in Arab countries.

== Foundation ==
The idea of establishing a specialized Arab professional body concerned with organizing the profession of those working in the IP field at the Arab level was devised by some leading IP practitioners of the profession in the Arab world led by Talal Abu-Ghazaleh, Founder and Chairman of the Talal Abu-Ghazaleh Organization (TAGorg), who made intensive contacts and held several meetings since February 1984 with WIPO’s Director General, Dr. Arbad Bogesh in order to put into practice the idea of establishment.

The Society was established on February 23, 1987, in Munich, Germany under the name The Arab Society for the Protection of Industrial Property. About 142 founders from the Arab world attended the Society's constituent meeting. TAGorg's Chairman Talal Abu-Ghazaleh chaired the meeting during which the first Board of Directors was elected. This Board consisted of 10 members representing Kuwait, Egypt, Syria, Bahrain, Saudi Arabia, Sudan and Iraq.

== Objectives ==
The Arab Society for Intellectual Property holds the following objectives:

- To enhance and develop the system of IP protection.
- To develop and set effective mechanisms to support Intellectual Property Rights (IPRS) protection globally.
- To cooperate with international organizations and government offices in developing and enforcing IPRs in the Arab world.
- To develop and raise the scientific status and importance of the IP protection profession.
- To organize, host, and monitor IP educational courses, conferences, seminars and other events
- To collaborate with universities and professional organizations specialized in Intellectual Property to organize educational and professional programs on IPRS.

== International memberships and agreements ==
ASIP has a consultative status with the United Nations Economic and Social Council (ECOSOC) and an observer status with the World Intellectual Property Organization (WIPO). Moreover, ASIP holds membership in the Intellectual Property Constituency (IPC) of the Internet Corporation for Assigned Names and Numbers (ICANN).
