= Cornelia Rudloff-Schäffer =

Cornelia Rudloff-Schäffer (born 10 February 1957 in Bad Camberg/Taunus, West Germany) is a former president of the Deutsches Patent- und Markenamt (DPMA) (English: German Patent and Trademark Office), a post she held from 1 January 2009 until her retirement in January 2023. She studied law, politics and media studies and was, after the second legal civil service examination, employed as academic employee at the Max Planck Institute for Foreign and International Patent, Copyright and Competition Law (German: Max-Planck-Institut für ausländisches und internationales Patent-, Urheber- und Wettbewerbsrecht) and at the Institut for the Protection of Industrial Property (German: Institut für gewerblichen Rechtsschutz) at LMU Munich. She retired at the end of January 2023 and was succeeded by Eva Schewior. Rudloff-Schäffer was the first woman to head the German Patent and Trademark Office "in the 145-year history of the office".

Preceded by Jürgen Schade	President of the Deutsches Patent- und Markenamt (German Patent and Trade Mark Office); 2009–2023	Succeeded by Eva Schewior
