= Jürgen Dethloff =

German inventor and engineer

- Born: 12 May 1924; Stettin, Weimar Republic
- Died: 31 December 2002 (aged 78); Hamburg, Germany
- Occupations: Inventor, engineer

Jürgen Dethloff (12 May 1924 in Stettin – 31 December 2002) was a German inventor and engineer.

== Achievements ==
Together with German inventor Helmut Gröttrup he invented the smart card (chip card). A successor of the original chip is now used in tens of millions of credit cards.

== Patent ==
Dethloff and Gröttrup filed an application for a patent on 13 Sep 1969. However, the patent was only granted on 1 April 1982.

- "Einrichtung zur Durchführung von Bearbeitungsvorgängen mit wenigstens einem Identifikanden und einer Vorrichtung", Patentschrift DE-2760486C2

== Awards ==
- 1997: Rudolf-Diesel-Medaille
