= Auslegeschrift =

The Auslegeschrift was, in German patent law, the second reading, or publication, of a patent application. It has been examined and published.

German patents are often numbered or cited by the Auslegeschrift. This staged system was, from 1981 onwards, dropped. However, it continues to exist in many patent searches.

== See also ==
- European patent law
- History of patent law
- German Patent and Trade Mark Office
- Glossary of patent law terms

== Bibliography ==
- Hariolf Grupp u. a. (2002). Das deutsche Innovationssystem seit der Reichsgründung (in German). Birkhäuser. p. 43. ISBN 978-3-790814-79-8.
- Stephen R. Adams (2006). Information sources in patents. p. 78. ISBN 978-3-598244-43-8.
