= Talal Abu-Ghazaleh =

Palestinian businessman (born 1938)

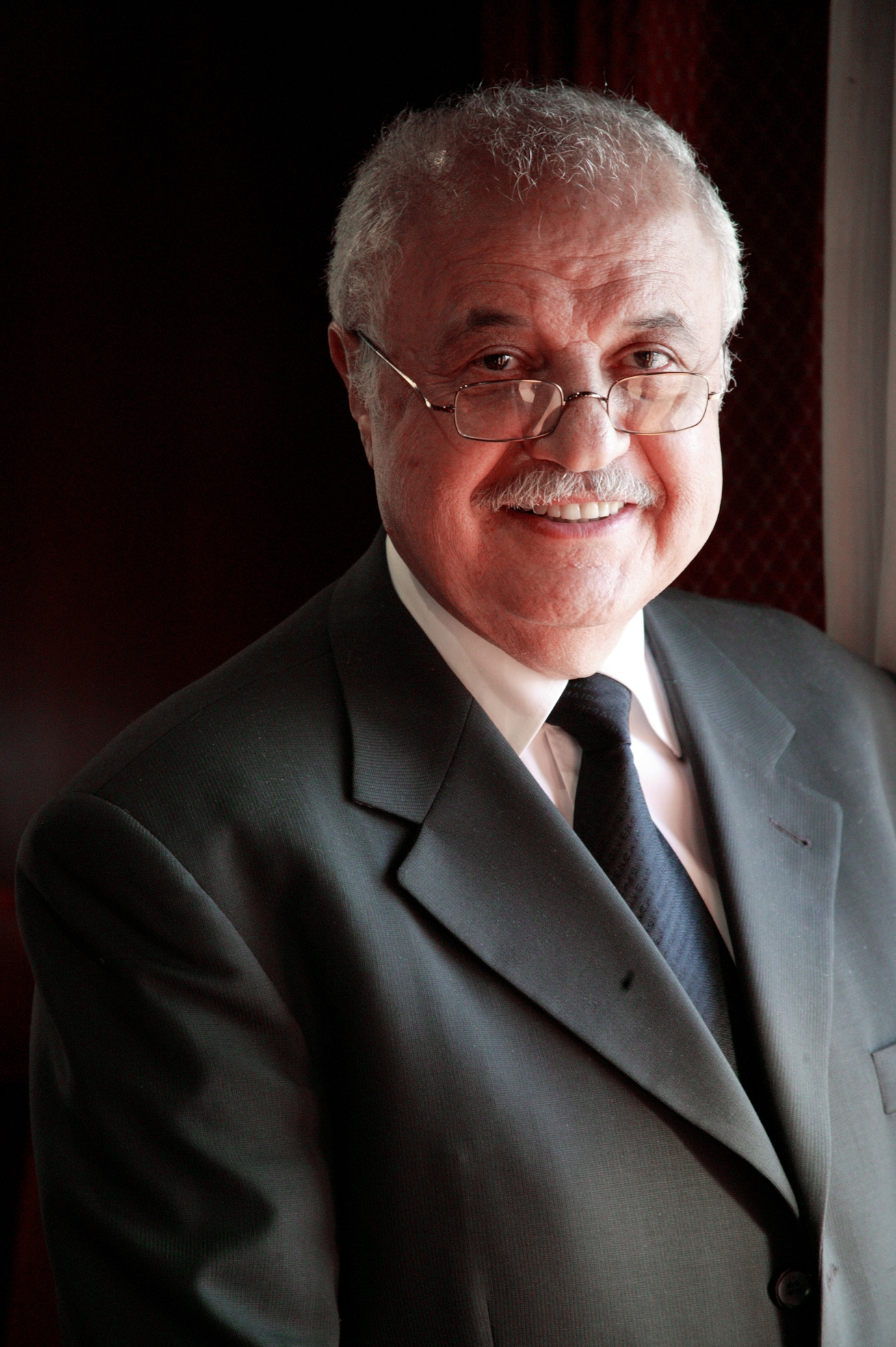
- HE Dr.Talal Abu-Ghazaleh in 2006
- Born: April 22, 1938 (age 88); Jaffa, Mandatory Palestine
- Education: American University of Beirut
- Occupation: Entrepreneur
- Organization: Talal Abu-Ghazaleh Organisation
- Known for: Chairman of TAG-ORG
- Children: 4
- Awards: -The Worldwide Alumni Association of AUC Distinguished Alumnus Award for 2016, from the American University of Beirut (2016).; - Honorary Award for recognition and acknowledgement of the strong partnership with he United Nations Development Programme, Jordan (2016).
- Website: www.talalabughazaleh.com

Talal Abu-Ghazaleh (Arabic: طلال أبو غزالة; born 22 April 1938) is a Jordanian-Palestinian businessman, entrepreneur, and the founder and chairman of the Talal Abu-Ghazaleh Organization (TAG-Org), an international company headquartered in Jordan. He has been recognized for his role in promoting intellectual property rights in the Arab world.

== Early life ==
Abu-Ghazaleh was born on 22 April 1938 in Jaffa, Mandatory Palestine. His father was a businessperson dealing with oil companies, and his mother was of Syrian descent from Damascus. The family fled or was expelled to Lebanon following the 1948 Arab-Israeli War.

== Education and career ==
Abu-Ghazaleh attended the American University of Beirut, where he began his career as a teacher and translator while still a student. He earned his Bachelor of Science in Business Administration in 1960. Abu-Ghazaleh later received several honorary doctorates from various institutions.

In 1969, Abu-Ghazaleh founded his own firms specializing in accounting and intellectual property rights. He has established partnerships with various global organizations, including the United Nations and the World Trade Organization.

== Selected honors ==
- Senator, Jordanian Upper House, The Hashemite Kingdom of Jordan (2016).
- The Worldwide Alumni Association of AUB Distinguished Alumnus Award for 2016, from the American University of Beirut (2016).
- ֺ Honorary Award for recognition and acknowledgment of the strong partnership with the United Nations Development Programme, Jordan (2016).
- Honorary Award for Enhancing the Sino-Arab Relations from HE Mr. Xi Jinping, President of the People’s Republic of China, Egypt (2016).
- Abu-Ghazaleh Social Responsibility Awards launched by CSR Regional Network for his efforts in social initiatives, Kingdom of Bahrain (2014).
- Visionary Leader Award from the Asian Education Leadership Awards, the UAE (2013)
- Member of the WTO Panel on Defining the Future of Trade, Geneva, 2012.
- The Arab Award for Media Creativity from the Arab Media Forum, Kuwait-2012.
- Member of the Upper House, Amman, Jordan, (2010-2011).
- Man of the Year Award from Palestine International Institute, Amman, 2012.
- Award of “Arab ICT Personality” of the Year 2010 from Union of Arab ICT Associations, Kingdom of Bahrain (2010).
- Honorary Award, The Arab Federation for the Protection of Intellectual Property Rights (AFPIPR), Jordan, 2009.
- The International Lifetime Achievement Award, Dubai, UAE, 2008.
- IP Hall of Fame Inductee, IP Hall of Fame Academy, Chicago, USA, 2007.
- Aljazeera Award for Lifetime Achievement, Qatar (2004).
- Honorary Doctor of Humane Letters, Canisius College, New York, USA, 1988.
- Bachelor of Science in Business Administration, The American University of Beirut, Lebanon (1960).
- Order of the Republic (Tunisia), 1985.
- Chevalier de la Légion d'honneur, France, 1985.
- Coat of Arms of the Kuwaiti Association of Accountants and Auditors, 1983.
- Gold Mercury International Award, Bahrain, 1978.
- Decoration of Independence of the Hashemite Kingdom of Jordan, Jordan 1967.

== Selected chairmanships ==
- Jordanian National Orchestra Association – JOrchestra (2014).
- Chair of the International, Arab Society of Certified Accountants (IASCA), London (1985–present); in consultative status with the United Nations Economic and Social Council, (ECOSOC).

== Selected board memberships ==
- Member of the Advisory Board of Hamdan Bin Mohammed Smart University, the United Arab Emirates (2014)
- Member of Bretton Woods Committee, the United States (2014).
- Board of Trustees, American University of Beirut, Beirut, Lebanon (1980–1982).

== Music patronages ==
- TAGO Golden Jubilee concert, London, UK (July 1997).
- Private concert by Ramzi Yassa, Seattle, USA (1994).
- Patron, Freunde der Salzburger Festspâele, Salzburg, Austria (1976).

== Initiatives and publications ==
  - Talal Abu-Ghazaleh ICT Dictionary 2nd edition (2013).
  - Talal Abu-Ghazaleh IP Dictionary 2nd edition (2013).
  - Talal Abu-Ghazaleh Dictionary of Patents (2012).
  - Talal Abu-Ghazaleh Legal Dictionary (2012).
  - Talal Abu-Ghazaleh Collocations Dictionary (2012).
  - Abu-Ghazaleh ICT Directory (2008).
  - The Abu-Ghazaleh Accountancy & Business Dictionary (2001).
  - The Abu-Ghazaleh IP Dictionary (2000).
  - The Abu-Ghazaleh English-Arabic Dictionary of Accounting (1978).
