= Talal Abu-Ghazaleh Organization =

Talal Abu-Ghazaleh Organization (TAG-Org)
- TAGORG's brand log
- Type: Holding company
- Industry: • Financial services • Auditing & Accounting • Intellectual property • Education & Training • Project management • Technical translation • Information technology
- Founded: 1972
- Headquarters: HQ in Amman; operating in more than 100 offices worldwide
- Key people: Mr. Talal Abu-Ghazaleh: Chairman; Ms. Samar Al-Labbad: Deputy Chair
- Website: www.Tagorg.com

The Talal Abu-Ghazaleh Organization (TAG-Org), is an international holding company that operates out of more than 100 offices worldwide in the Arab region, Africa Europe, Asia and North America.

The organisation is a leading provider of professional services having established a total of 60 member firms and societies since its inception, in addition to being an affiliate of the World Bank, the Register of Accountants and Auditors (Washington) and the UN Center for Transnational Corporations (UNCTC). TAG-Org is mostly noted for its role in supporting Arab innovators through promoting the concept and relevance of intellectual property rights (IPRs) in Arab countries during the seventies, particularly with the formation of Abu-Ghazaleh Intellectual Property (AGIP) in 1972, and later the Arab Society for Intellectual Property (ASIP) in 1987.

The company produced the electronic encyclopedia Tagepedia in 2013 which now increased its number of entries to 1,200,000. However, it is not a free encyclopedia like Wikipedia. (see register.tagepedia.org).

== Timeline ==
- 1972: TAG-Org founded as Talal Abu-Ghazaleh & Co. (TAGCO), in Kuwait by Talal Abu-Ghazaleh.
- 1975: TAGCO publishes first English-Arabic Dictionary for Accounting.
- 1983: The Arab Society for Certified Accountants (IASCA) is formed in London, England.
- 1985: Talal Abu-Ghazaleh is awarded the prestigious French Chevalier de la Légion d'honneur award at the Elysee Palace in Paris, France, and the First Arab International Accountancy conference is convened in Tunisia.
- 1987: The Arab Society for the Protection of Industrial Property (ASPIP) is formed, later to be known as the Arab Society for Intellectual Property (ASIP).
- 1989: The Arab Management Society is formed, later to be known as The Arab International Society for Management Technology (AIMICT).
- 1997: The Arab Licensing and Technology Transfer Society (ALTTS) is formed, later to be known as the Licensing Executives Society – Arab Countries (LES-AC).
- 2001: TAG-Org agrees with WTO to launch Arabic WTO website and agreement signed between TAG-Org and CIE–University of Cambridge.
- 2004: AGIP releases Intellectual property Dictionary and AGIP News Agency launched, and ACPA certificate accredited by the University of Cambridge.
- 2005: APCO Worldwide forms strategic partnership with TAG-Org.
- 2006: Talal Abu-Ghazaleh School of Business (TAG-SB) is launched as part of the German – Jordanian University
- 2013: TAG-Org enters into cooperation agreement with Russell Bedford International
- 2014: Talal Abu-Ghazaleh Knowledge and Wealth Creation Center Launched
- 2015: TAG-Org to Launch New Companies in Russia
- 2016: Business Coaching is the New Service of TAG-Org
- 2017: Abu-Ghazaleh Launches the Talal Abu-Ghazaleh International Diploma in IT Skills (TAG-DIT)

== Affiliations ==
Over the course of its existence, TAGOrg has managed to develop numerous ties and affiliations with major international organizations, and in some cases, act as a promoter of their cause to Arab countries. The most notable of these affiliations include:

- United Nations Conference on Trade and Development (UNCTAD)
- World Trade Organization (WTO)
- United Nations Development Program (UNDP)
- International Auditing Practice Committee (IAPC)
- International Accounting Standards Committee (IASC)
- International Federation of Accountants (IFAC)
- International Standards of Accounting and Reporting (ISAR])
- International Chamber of Commerce (ICC)
- Licensing Executives Society International (LESI)

== Educational institutions of Talal Abu-Ghazaleh Organizations ==
Educational institutions of Talal Abu-Ghazaleh Organizations: universities and colleges that offer academic certificates:

- The Arab Organization for Quality Assurance in Education (AROQA)
- Talal Abu-Ghazaleh University College of Business (TAG-UCB)
- Talal Abu-Ghazaleh University Company (Lebanon) - (TAGI-UNI)
- Arab States Research and Education Network (ASREN)
- Talal Abu-Ghazaleh Graduate School of Business (TAG-SB)
- Talal Abu-Ghazaleh Knowledge Society (TAGKS)
- Talal Abu-Ghazaleh Academy (TAG-Academy)
- International Arab Society of Certified Accountants (IASCA)
- The Arab International Society for Management Technology (AIMICT)
