= Industrial design rights in the European Union =

Industrial design rights in the European Union are provided at both the Union level by virtue of the European Union design ("EU design") and at the national level under individual national laws.

== Eligible designs ==
A design is defined as "the appearance of the whole or a part of a product resulting from the features of, in particular, the lines, contours, colours, shape, texture and/or materials of the product itself and/or its ornamentation".

Designs may be protected if:

- they are novel, that is if no design identical or differing only in immaterial details has been made available to the public;
- they have individual character, that is the "informed user" would find the overall impression different from other designs which are available to the public. Where a design forms part of a more complex product, the novelty and individual character of the design are judged on the part of the design which is visible during normal use.

Designs are not protected insofar as their appearance is wholly determined by their technical function, or by the need to interconnect with other products to perform a technical function (the "must-fit" exception). However modular systems such as Lego or Meccano may be protected.

== European Union design ==
Registered and unregistered European Union designs are available under EU Regulation 6/2002, which provides a unitary right covering the European Union. Protection for a registered EU design is for up to 25 years, subject to the payment of renewal fees every five years. The unregistered EU design lasts for three years after a design is made available to the public and infringement only occurs if the protected design has been copied.

== National laws ==
National systems of registered designs remain in place alongside the system of EU designs: registration in a small number of countries is cheaper than EU registration, and may be more appropriate for smaller manufacturers. The Benelux countries (Belgium, Netherlands, Luxembourg) form a single area with respect to designs, administered by the Benelux Office for Intellectual Property.

National laws are harmonised by the Directive on the legal protection of designs: the criteria for eligibility and the duration of protection are the same as for registered EU designs. Many Member States also protect unregistered design rights under their national law, but these are not covered by the Directive.

== International treaties ==
The protection of industrial design rights is required by the Agreement on Trade-Related Aspects of Intellectual Property Rights (TRIPS, Arts. 25 & 26), to which the European Union is a party. The Regulation on Community designs provides for the recognition of the priority date of an application for design right registration in a country which is either a member of the World Trade Organization or a party to the Paris Convention for the Protection of Industrial Property.

On 1 January 2008, the European Union became a party to the Geneva Act of the Hague Agreement Concerning the International Registration of Industrial Designs. This followed the proposal of the European Commission on 22 December 2005.

== Spare parts used for repair ==
The protection of "component parts of complex products", in particular spare parts for cars, was left to Member States' discretion in Directive 98/71/EC, given the divergence of practices and opinions. As required by that Directive, the European Commission has conducted research on the question, which found that spare parts such as wings and bumpers were 6.4–10.3% more expensive in countries where these parts were protected by industrial design rights compared with countries where no such protection existed: it has proposed that the design right protection on these parts be abolished throughout the European Union.

== See also ==
- European Union trade mark
- World Intellectual Property Organization
- Japanese design law
