= Regulation on European Union designs =

European Union registration of industrial design rights

Regulation (EC) No 6/2002
- European Union regulation
- Title: Regulation on European Union designs
- Made by: European Council
- Made under: Art. 308
- Journal reference: L3, 2002-01-05, pp. 1–24

History
- Date made: 2001-12-12
- Entry into force: 2002-03-06

Preparative texts
- Commission proposal: C29, 1994-01-31, p. 20; C248, 2000-08-29, p. 3
- EESC opinion: C110, 1995-05-02; C75, 2000-03-15, p. 35
- EP opinion: C67, 2001-03-01, p. 318
- Reports

Other legislation
- Replaces: —
- Amends: —
- Amended by: Regulation (EU) 2024/2822 of the European Parliament and of the Council of 23 October 2024 amending Council Regulation (EC) No 6/2002 on Community designs and repealing Commission Regulation (EC) No 2246/2002
- Replaced by: —

Council Regulation (EC) No 6/2002 of 12 December 2001 on European Union designs is a European Union regulation which introduces a unified system of industrial design rights, called European Union designs ("EU designs"), throughout the European Union. The system which includes both unregistered and registered design rights, operates in addition to national systems of protection in each Member State, which are partially harmonised by the Directive on the legal protection of designs (98/71/EC).

== Eligible designs ==
A design is defined as "the appearance of the whole or a part of a product resulting from the features of, in particular, the lines, contours, colours, shape, texture and/or materials of the product itself and/or its ornamentation" (Art. 3). Designs may be protected if:

- they are novel, that is if no identical design has been made available to the public;
- they have individual character, that is the "informed user" would find it different from other designs which are available to the public.

Where a design forms part of a more complex product, the novelty and individual character of the design are judged on the part of the design which is visible during normal use.

Designs are not protected insofar as their appearance is wholly determined by their technical function, or by the need to interconnect with other products to perform a technical function (the "must-fit" exception). However modular systems such as Lego or Mechano may be protected [Art. 8(3)].

== Unregistered European Union designs ==
All designs which are eligible are protected as unregistered EU designs for a period of three years from the date on which the design was first made available to the public in the European Union. "The public" in this case is defined as "the circles specialised in the sector concerned".

== Registration of designs ==
Eligible designs may be registered within one year of their first being made available to the public: it is also possible to claim "priority" if an application for a registered design right has been made in a country party to the Paris Convention for the Protection of Industrial Property (Paris Convention) or the Agreement on Trade-Related Aspects of Intellectual Property Rights (TRIPS) in the six months prior to the application for registration of the EU design. Applications may be made in national intellectual property offices, in the Benelux design office or directly at the European Union Intellectual Property Office (EUIPO) in Alicante, Spain. The detailed rules for applications and procedures for registration are contained in Commission Regulation (EC) No 2245/2002, while the fees are specified in Commission Regulation (EC) No 2246/2002.

== Publication and language ==
Applications may be filed in any official language of the European Union.

== See also ==
- Industrial design rights in the European Union
- European Union trade mark
