= Benelux =

Western European politico-economic union

Benelux Union: Benelux Unie (Dutch); Union Benelux (French)
- Logo of the Benelux

- Member states of the Benelux Union
- Administrative centre and largest agglomeration: Brussels; 50°51′N 4°21′E
- Official languages: French; Dutch
- Type: Politico-economic union
- Member states: Belgium; Netherlands; Luxembourg

Leaders
  - Secretary-General: Ariadne Petridis
  - Deputy Secretaries-General: Liesje Schreinemacher; Tom Köller
- Legislature: Interparliamentary Assembly

Establishment
  - Customs union treaty signed: 5 September 1944
  - Customs union in effect: 1 January 1948
  - Renewal signed: 17 June 2008
  - Renewal in effect: 1 January 2010

Area
  - Total: 75,140 km^{2} (29,010 sq mi)

Population
  - 2026 estimate: ▲30.688.801
  - Density: 408/km^{2} (1,056.7/sq mi)
- GDP (PPP): 2026 estimate
  - Total: ▲$2.649 trillion
  - Per capita: ▲$86,330
- GDP (nominal): 2026 estimate
  - Total: ▲$2.307 trillion
  - Per capita: ▲$75,173
- Currency: Euro (EUR)
- Time zone: UTC+1 (CET)
  - Summer (DST): UTC+2 (CEST)
- Website www.benelux.int

The Benelux Union, (Note: Dutch: Benelux Unie; French: Union Benelux; German: Benelux-Union; Luxembourgish: Benelux-Unioun; West Frisian: Benelúks Uny.) or simply Benelux, is a politico-economic union, alliance and formal international intergovernmental cooperation of three neighbouring states in Western Europe: Belgium, the Netherlands, and Luxembourg. The name is a syllabic abbreviation formed from the initial syllable of each country's name and was first used to name the customs agreement that initiated the union (signed in 1944). It is now used more generally to refer to the geographic, economic, and cultural grouping of the three countries.

The Benelux is an economically dynamic and densely populated region, with 5.6% of the European population (29.55 million residents) and 7.9% of the joint EU GDP (€36,000/resident) on 1.7% of the whole surface of the EU. In 2015, 37% of the total number of EU cross-border workers worked in the Benelux; 35,000 Belgian residents work in Luxembourg, while 37,000 others cross the border to work in the Netherlands each day. In addition, 12,000 Dutch and close to a thousand Luxembourg residents work in Belgium.

The main institutions of the Union are the Committee of Ministers, the Council of the Union, the General Secretariat, the Interparliamentary Consultative Council and the Benelux Court of Justice. The Benelux Office for Intellectual Property (BOIP) covers the same land but is not part of the Benelux Union. However, as from June 2018, the Benelux Court of Justice has the competence to judge BOIP's decisions in appeal.

The Benelux General Secretariat is located in Brussels. It is the central platform of the Benelux Union cooperation. It handles the secretariat of the Committee of Ministers, the Council of Benelux Union and the sundry committees and working parties. The General Secretariat provides day-to-day support for the Benelux cooperation on the substantive, procedural, diplomatic and logistical levels. The Secretary-General is Ariadne Petridis from Belgium and there are two deputies: Deputy Secretary-General Liesje Schreinemacher from the Netherlands and Deputy Secretary-General Tom Köller from Luxembourg.

The presidency of the Benelux is held in turn by the three countries for a period of one year. The Netherlands hold the presidency for 2026.

About 80 percent of the population of the Benelux countries speaks Dutch as a native language, around 20 percent speaks French. Approximately 1 percent speaks Luxembourgish and approximately 1 percent speaks Frisian as first languages. A small minority, under 1 percent, are native German speakers.

== History ==
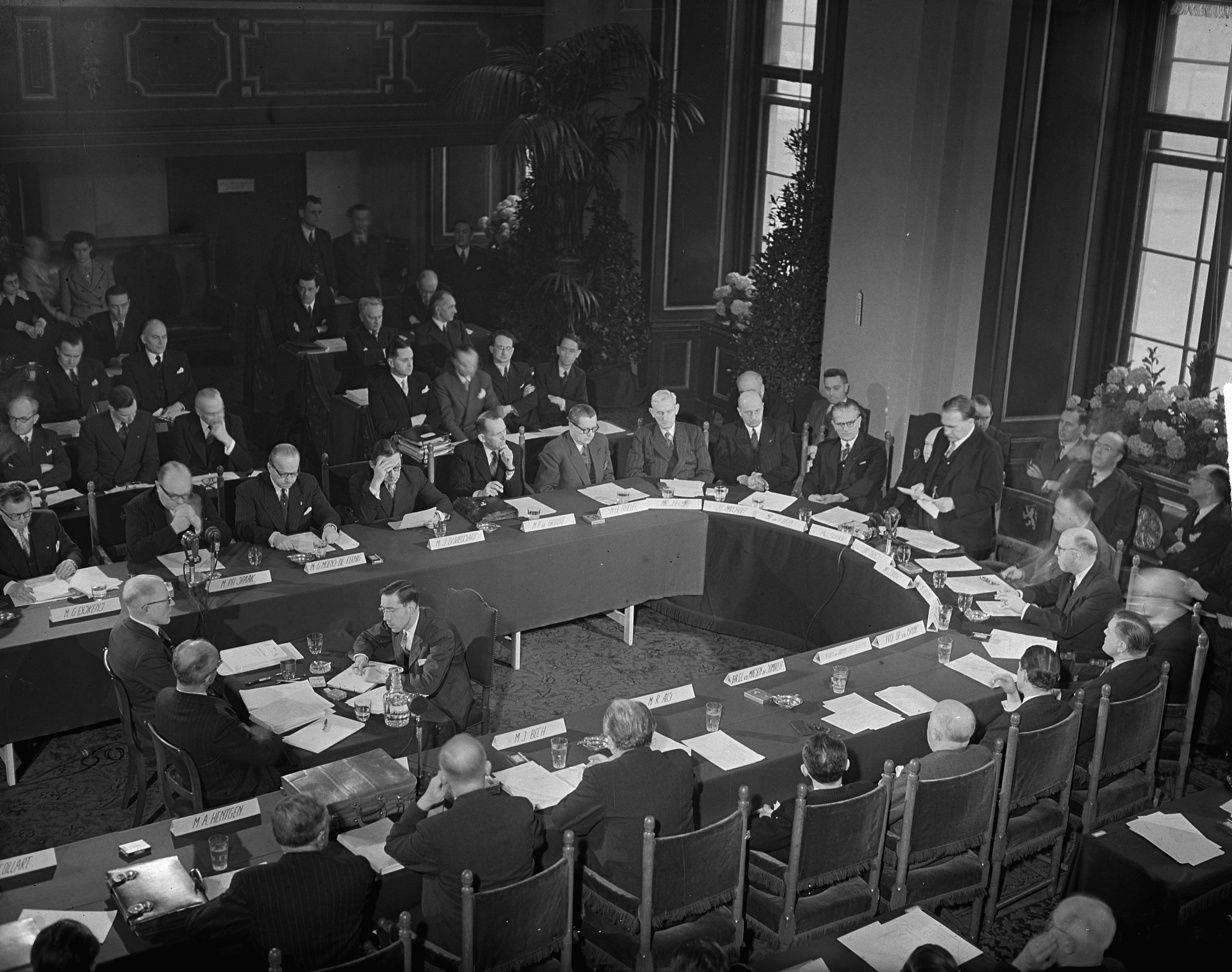
Meeting of Benelux delegates in The Hague, 1949

Before World War I, Luxembourg formed part of the Zollverein with the German Empire. The collapse of this customs union led to the Belgium–Luxembourg Economic Union in 1921 which established a customs union and limited monetary union between the two states and fixed the exchange rates between the Belgian franc and Luxembourg franc.

In 1944, exiled representatives of Belgium, Luxembourg, and the Netherlands signed the London Customs Convention, the treaty that established the Benelux Customs Union. Ratified in 1947, the treaty was in force from 1948 until it was superseded by the Benelux Economic Union. The initial form of economic cooperation expanded steadily over time, leading to the signing of the treaty establishing the Benelux Economic Union (Benelux Economische Unie, Union Économique Benelux) on 3 February 1958 in The Hague, which came into force on 1 November 1960. Initially, the purpose of cooperation among the three partners was to put an end to customs barriers at their borders and ensure free movement of persons, capital, services, and goods between the three countries. This treaty was the first example of international economic integration in Europe since World War II.

The three countries therefore foreshadowed and provided the model for future European integration, such as the European Coal and Steel Community, the European Economic Community (EEC), and the European Community–European Union (EC–EU). The three partners also launched the Schengen process, which came into operation in 1985. Benelux cooperation has been constantly adapted and now goes much further than mere economic cooperation, extending to new and topical policy areas connected with security, sustainable development, and the economy.

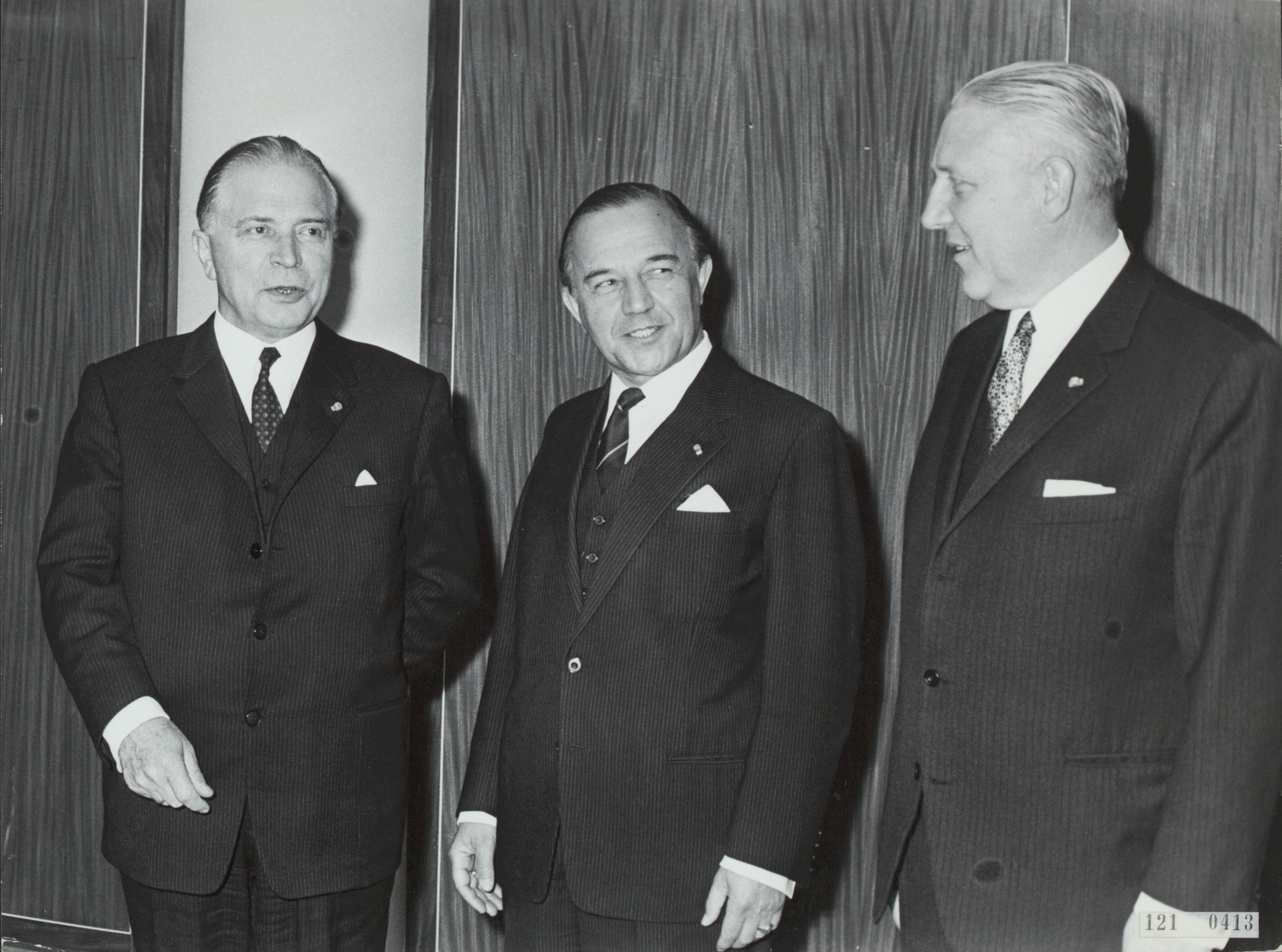
Belgian Prime Minister Gaston Eyskens, Dutch Prime Minister Piet de Jong, and Luxembourgish Prime Minister Pierre Werner during a Benelux conference in The Hague, Netherlands, on 28 April 1968

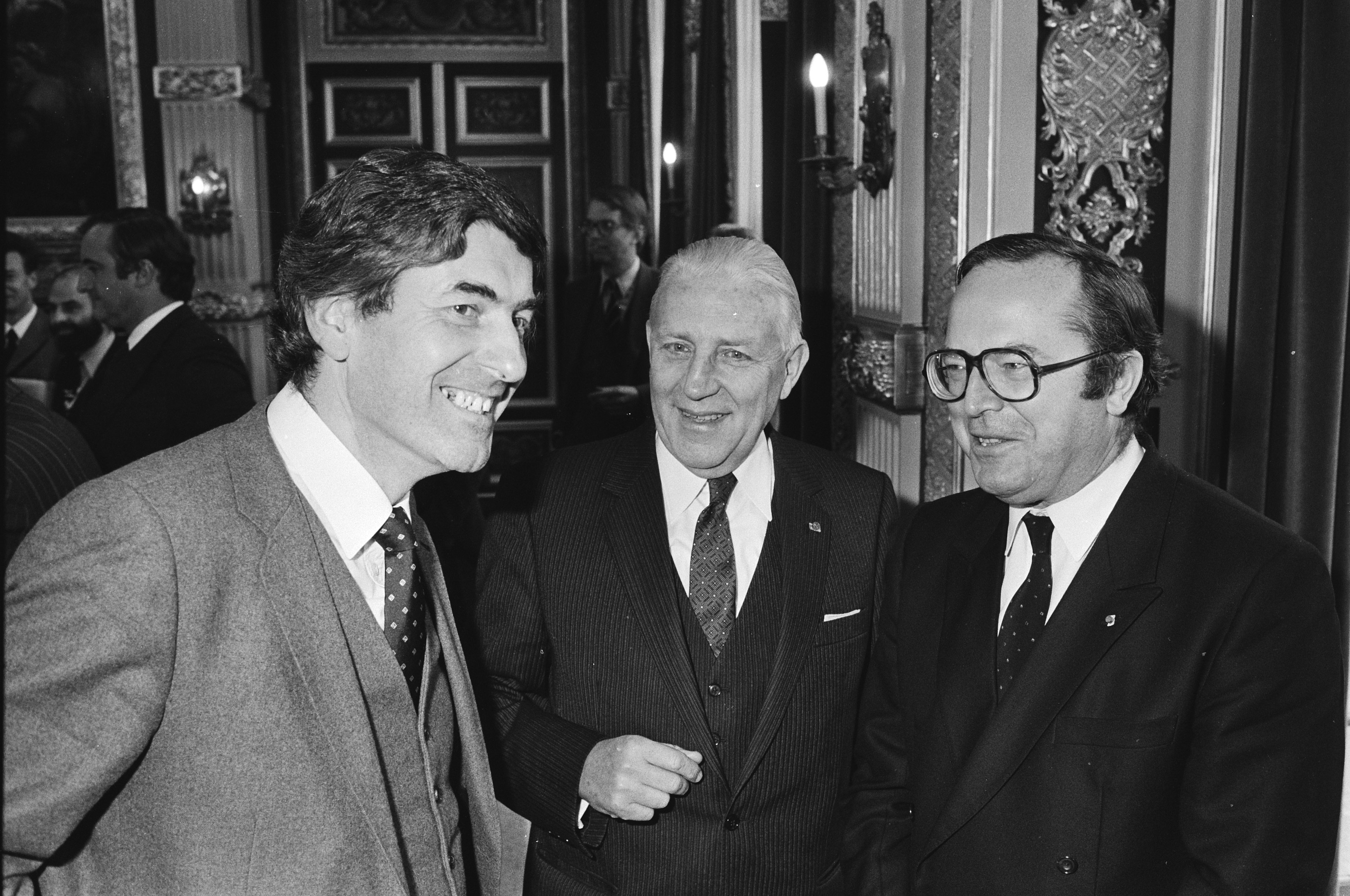
Dutch Prime Minister Ruud Lubbers, Luxembourgish Prime Minister Pierre Werner, and Belgian Prime Minister Wilfried Martens at the Ministry of General Affairs, on 10 November 1982

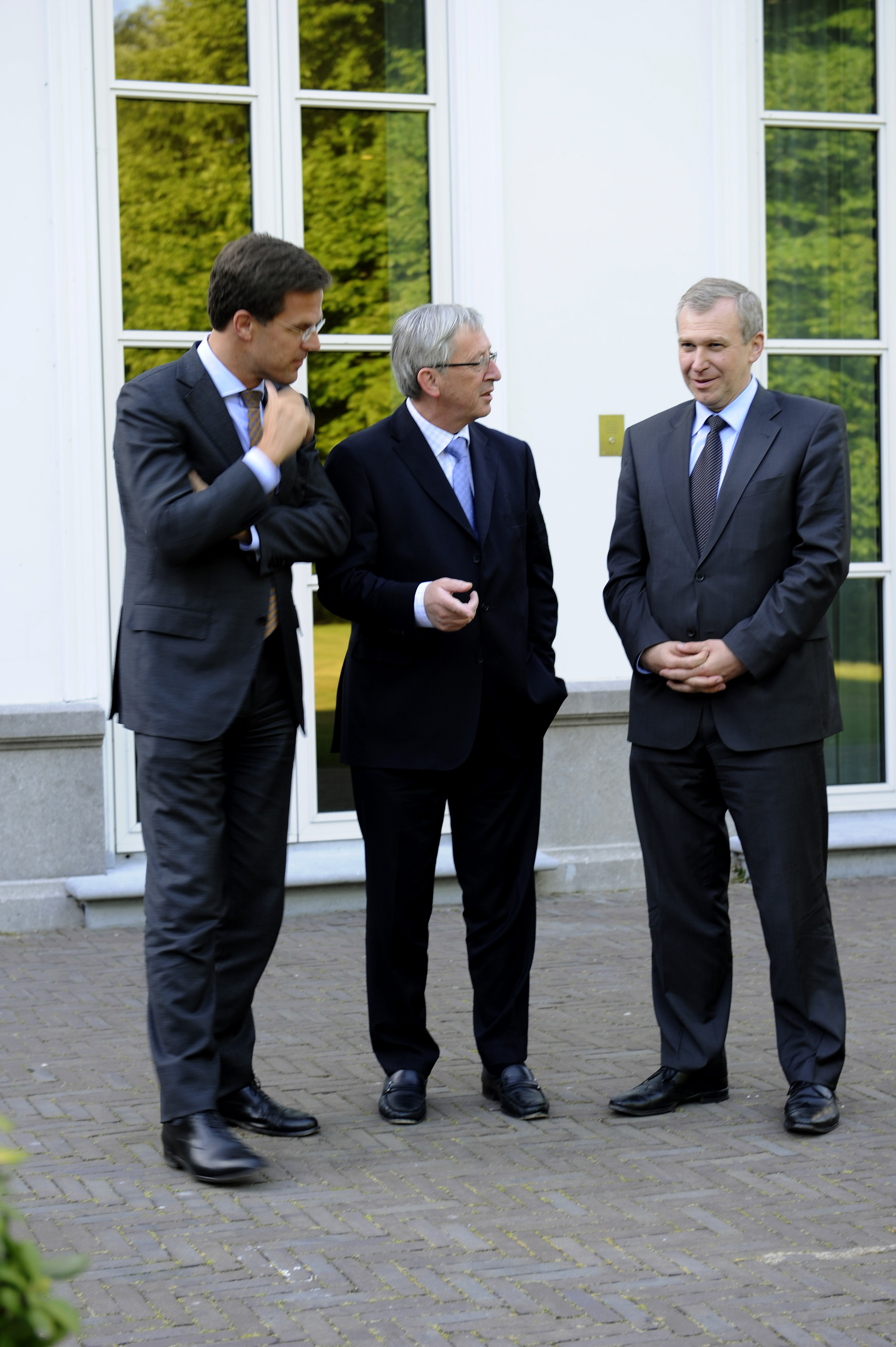
Dutch Prime Minister Mark Rutte, Luxembourgish Prime Minister Jean-Claude Juncker, and Belgian Prime Minister Yves Leterme in The Hague, Netherlands, on 24 May 2011

In 1965, the treaty establishing a Benelux Court of Justice was signed. It entered into force in 1974. The court, composed of judges from the highest courts of the three states, has to guarantee the uniform interpretation of common legal rules. This international judicial institution is located in Luxembourg.

=== Renewal of the agreement ===
The 1958 Treaty between the Benelux countries establishing the Benelux Economic Union was limited to a period of 50 years. During the following years, and even more so after the creation of the European Union, the Benelux cooperation focused on developing other fields of activity within a constantly changing international context.

At the end of the 50 years, the governments of the three Benelux countries decided to renew the agreement, taking into account the new aspects of the Benelux-cooperation – such as security – and the new federal government structure of Belgium. The original establishing treaty, set to expire in 2010, was replaced by a new legal framework (called the Treaty revising the Treaty establishing the Benelux Economic Union), which was signed on 17 June 2008.

The new treaty has no set time limit and the name of the Benelux Economic Union changed to Benelux Union to reflect the broad scope on the union. The main objectives of the treaty are the continuation and enlargement of the cooperation between the three member states within a larger European context. The renewed treaty explicitly foresees the possibility that the Benelux countries will cooperate with other European member states or with regional cooperation structures. The new Benelux cooperation focuses on three main topics: internal market and economic union, sustainability, justice and internal affairs. The number of structures in the renewed Treaty has been reduced and thus simplified.

=== Benefits of the Benelux cooperation ===
1. Security and emergency services
  - Thanks to the Benelux Police Treaty (2023), police forces can operate across borders, strengthening the fight against crime.
  - Ambulances and fire services can operate across borders, ensuring faster response times in emergencies.
2. Recognition of diplomas
  - Higher education diplomas are automatically recognized within the Benelux, making it easier to work and study in another Benelux country. This prevents extra administrative costs and time loss.
3. Economy and transport
  - The removal of administrative barriers, such as with digital freight documents, makes cross-border transport more efficient and cost-effective for businesses.
4. Sustainability
  - The Benelux countries cooperate on energy transition and the circular economy, contributing to a sustainable and future-proof region.

The Benelux Union also serves as a testing ground for European cooperation. Initiatives such as diploma recognition and cross-border truck inspections set an example for further European harmonization.

=== Activities since 2008 ===
Benelux seeks region-to-region cooperation, be it with France and Germany (North Rhine-Westphalia) or beyond with the Baltic states, the Nordic Council, the Visegrad countries, or even further. In 2018, a renewed political declaration was adopted between Benelux and North Rhine-Westphalia to give cooperation a further impetus.

The Benelux is particularly active in the field of intellectual property. The three countries established a Benelux Trademarks Office and a Benelux Designs Office, both situated in The Hague. In 2005, they concluded a treaty establishing the Benelux Office for Intellectual Property, which replaced both offices upon its entry into force on 1 September 2006. This organisation is the official body for the registration of trademarks and designs in the Benelux. In addition, it offers the possibility to formally record the existence of ideas, concepts, designs, prototypes and the like.

Some examples of recent Benelux initiatives include: automatic level recognition of diplomas and degrees within the Benelux for bachelor's and master's programs in 2015, and for all other degrees in 2018; common road inspections in 2014; and a Benelux pilot with digital consignment notes (e-CMR) in 2017; a new Benelux Treaty on Police Cooperation in 2018, providing for direct access to each other's police databases and population registers within the limits of national legislation, and allowing some police forces to cross borders in some situations. The Benelux is also committed to working together on adaptation to climate change. A joint political declaration in July 2020 called on the European Commission to prioritise cycling in European climate policy and Sustainable Transport strategies, to co-finance the construction of cycling infrastructure, and to provide funds to stimulate cycling policy.

On 5 June 2018, the Benelux Treaty celebrated its 60 years of existence. In 2018, a Benelux Youth Parliament was created.

In addition to cooperation based on a Treaty, there is also political cooperation in the Benelux context, including summits of the Benelux government leaders. In 2019 a Benelux summit was held in Luxembourg. In 2020, a Benelux summit was held – online, due to the COVID-19 pandemic – under Dutch Presidency on 7 October between the prime ministers.

As of 1 January 2017, a new arrangement for NATO Air Policing started for the airspace of Belgium, the Netherlands and Luxemburg (Benelux). The Belgian Air Component and the Royal Netherlands Air Force will take four-month turns to ensure that Quick Reaction Alert (QRA) fighter jets are available at all times to be launched under NATO control.

=== Cooperation with other geopolitical regions ===
The Benelux countries also work together in the so-called Pentalateral Energy Forum, a regional cooperation group formed of five members—the Benelux states, France, Germany, Austria, and Switzerland. Formed on 6 June 2007, the ministers for energy from the various countries represent a total of 200 million residents and 40% of the European electricity network.

In 2017 the members of the Benelux, the Baltic Assembly, three members of the Nordic Council (Sweden, Denmark and Finland), and all the other countries EU member states, sought to increase cooperation in the Digital Single Market, as well as discussing social matters, the Economic and Monetary Union of the European Union, immigration and defence cooperation. Foreign relations in the wake of Russia's annexation of Crimea and the 2017 Turkish constitutional referendum were also on the agenda.

Since 2008 the Benelux Union works together with the German Land (state) North Rhine-Westphalia.

In 2018 Benelux Union signed a declaration with France to strengthen cross-border cooperation.

Eight decades after its founding, the Benelux Union continues to function as a sort of crucial laboratory or "guinea pig" for international cooperation, piloting experimental cross-border integration projects that frequently serve as templates for future European Union legislation.

== Politics ==
=== Benelux institutions ===
Under the 2008 treaty there are five Benelux institutions: the Benelux Committee of Ministers, the Benelux Council, the Benelux Parliament, the Benelux Court of Justice, the Benelux Secretariat General.

Beside these five institutions, there is the Benelux Organisation for Intellectual Property which is a separate and unrelated entity but which nonetheless makes use of the Benelux Court of Justice.

==== Benelux Committee of Ministers ====
The Committee of Ministers is the supreme decision-making body of the Benelux. It includes at least one representative at ministerial level from the three countries. Its composition varies according to its agenda. The ministers determine the orientations and priorities of Benelux cooperation. The presidency of the Committee rotates between the three countries on an annual basis.

==== Benelux Council ====
The council is composed of senior officials from the relevant ministries. Its composition varies according to its agenda. The council's main task is to prepare the dossiers for the ministers.

==== Benelux Interparliamentary Assembly ====
The Benelux Parliament (officially referred to as the "Interparliamentary Assembly") was created in 1955. This parliamentary assembly is composed of 49 members from the respective national parliaments (21 members of the Dutch parliament, 21 members of the Belgian national and regional parliaments, and 7 members of the Luxembourg parliament). Its members inform and advise their respective governments on all Benelux matters. On 20 January 2015, the governments of the three countries, including, as far as Belgium is concerned, the community and regional governments, signed in Brussels the Treaty of the Benelux Interparliamentary Assembly. This treaty entered into force on 1 August 2019. This superseded the 1955 Convention on the Consultative Interparliamentary Council for the Benelux. The official name has been largely obsolete in daily practice for a number of years: both internally in the Benelux and in external references, the name Benelux Parliament has been used de facto for a number of years now.

==== Benelux Court of Justice ====
The Benelux Court of Justice is an international court. Its mission is to promote uniformity in the application of Benelux legislation. When faced with difficulty interpreting a common Benelux legal rule, national courts must seek an interpretive ruling from the Benelux Court, which subsequently renders a binding decision. The members of the Court are appointed from among the judges of the Court of Cassation of Belgium, the Supreme Court of the Netherlands and the Court of Cassation of Luxembourg.

==== Benelux Secretariat-General ====
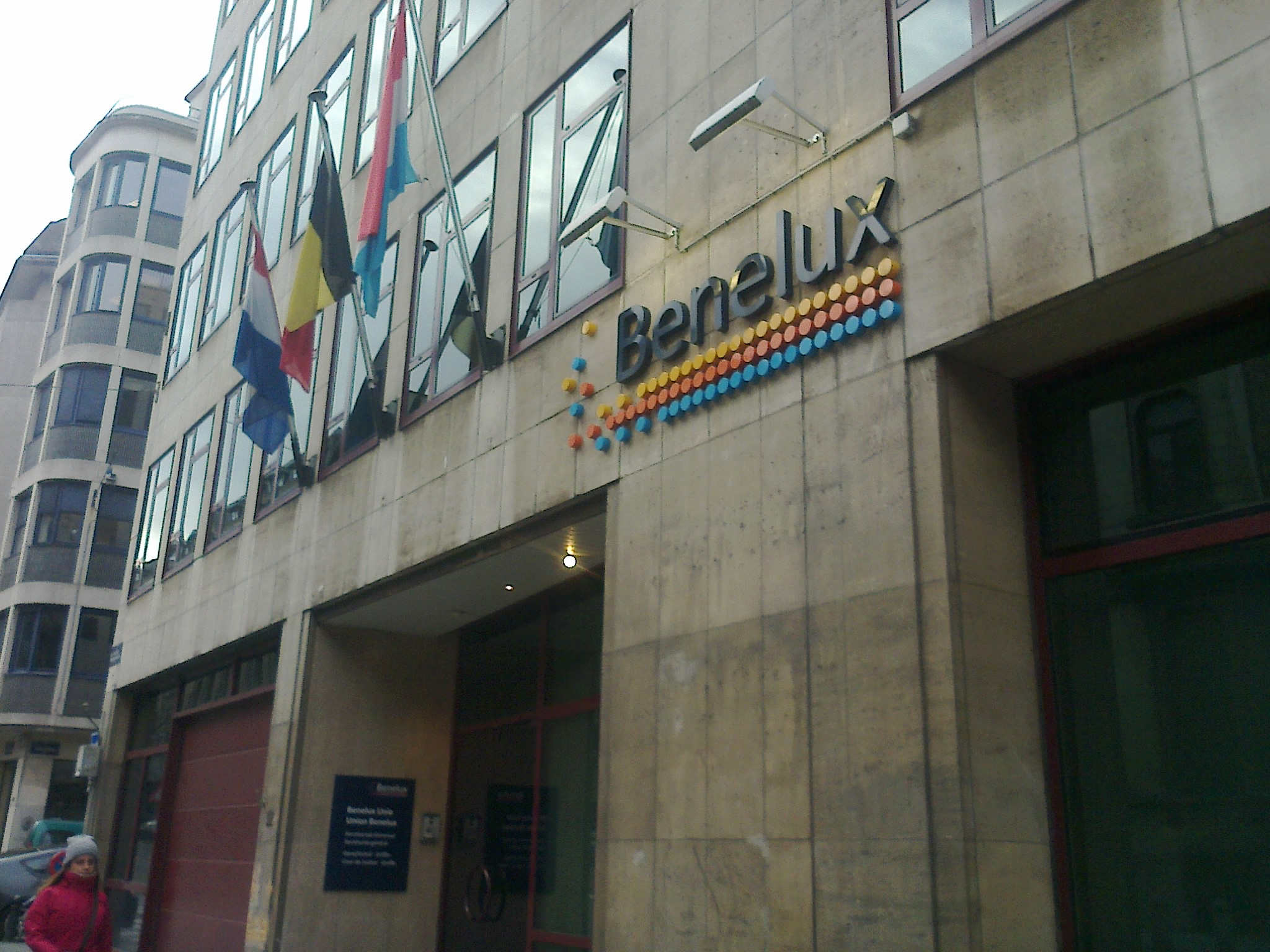
The office of the Benelux Secretariat-General in Brussels

The Secretariat-General, which is based in Brussels, forms the cooperation platform of the Benelux Union. It acts as the secretariat of the Committee of Ministers, the council and various commissions and working groups. The General Secretariat has years of expertise in the area of Benelux cooperation and is familiar with the policy agreements and differences between the three countries. Building on what already been achieved, the General Secretariat puts its knowledge, network and experience at the service of partners and stakeholders who endorse its mission. It initiates, supports and monitors cooperation results in the areas of economy, sustainability and security.

The Secretary General of the Benelux is Frans Weekers (NL), the Deputy Secretary General is Michel-Etienne Tilemans (BE) and Jean-Claude Meyer (LU)

Benelux works together on the basis of an annual plan embedded in a four-year joint work programme.

=== Benelux legal instruments ===
The Benelux Union involves intergovernmental cooperation.

The Treaty establishing the Benelux Union explicitly provides that the Benelux Committee of Ministers can resort to four legal instruments (art. 6, paragraph 2, under a), f), g) and h)):

1. Decisions

Decisions are legally binding regulations for implementing the Treaty establishing the Benelux Union or other Benelux treaties.

Their legally binding force concerns the Benelux states (and their sub-state entities), which have to implement them. However, they have no direct effect towards individual citizens or companies (notwithstanding any indirect protection of their rights based on such decisions as a source of international law). Only national provisions implementing a decision can directly create rights and obligations for citizens or companies.

2. Agreements

The Committee of Ministers can draw up agreements, which are then submitted to the Benelux states (and/or their sub-state entities) for signature and subsequent parliamentary ratification. These agreements can deal with any subject matter, also in policy areas that are not yet covered by cooperation in the framework of the Benelux Union.

These are in fact traditional treaties, with the same direct legally binding force towards both authorities and citizens or companies. The negotiations do however take place in the established context of the Benelux working groups and institutions, rather than on an ad hoc basis.

3. Recommendations

Recommendations are non-binding orientations, adopted at ministerial level, which underpin the functioning of the Benelux Union. These (policy) orientations may not be legally binding, but given their adoption at the highest political level and their legal basis vested directly in the Treaty, they do entail a strong moral obligation for any authority concerned in the Benelux countries.

4. Directives

Directives of the Committee of Ministers are mere inter-institutional instructions towards the Benelux Council and/or the Secretariat-General, for which they are binding. This instrument has so far only been used occasionally, basically in order to organize certain activities within a Benelux working group or to give them impetus.

All four instruments require the unanimous approval of the members of the Committee of Ministers (and, in the case of agreements, subsequent signature and ratification at national level).

== See also ==
- Belgium–Luxembourg relations
- Belgium–Netherlands relations
- Luxembourg–Netherlands relations
- Admiral Benelux
- EU Med Group
- Baltic Assembly
- Inner Six
- Low Countries
- Nordic Council
- United Kingdom of the Netherlands
- Visegrád Group
- Polish–Czechoslovak confederation
- Proposed United Kingdom Confederation
