= Belgium–Luxembourg relations =

- Belgium: Luxembourg

Diplomatic mission
- Embassy of Belgium, Luxembourg: Embassy of Luxembourg, Brussels

Belgium–Luxembourg relations are the bilateral relations between the Kingdom of Belgium and Grand Duchy of Luxembourg. Both countries have a history of close cooperation, notably within the Belgium–Luxembourg Economic Union, Benelux and within the European Union. Both countries are also members of NATO and Organization for Security and Co-operation in Europe. Belgium and Luxembourg share a land border. The Belgian side of the border is mostly Luxembourg Province, with a small part of the German-speaking municipality of Burg-Reuland in Liège Province also bordering the Grand Duchy.

Belgium has an embassy in Luxembourg City and Luxembourg has an embassy in Brussels. From 12 November 1964 to 7 October 2000, the Grand Duchess consort of Luxembourg was Josephine-Charlotte, born a Princess of Belgium and wife of Grand Duke Jean of Luxembourg.

== History ==
=== Early history ===
Partitions of Luxembourg with yellow areas going to Belgium

Belgium and Luxembourg belonged successively to the Burgundian and Habsburg Netherlands and thus shared a common history. After the Congress of Vienna in 1815, the territories that now make up Belgium and Luxembourg were initially part of the United Kingdom of the Netherlands under King William I. However, in 1830, Belgium fought for its independence in a revolution, in which many Luxembourgers also took part. The revolution spread to large parts of Luxembourg, and only Luxembourg City remained loyal to King William. The Luxembourger Jean-Baptiste Nothomb was a champion of the Belgian cause and, as one of the “fathers” of the Belgian Constitution, served as head of government from 1841 to 1845. As a result of international mediation, the Grand Duchy of Luxembourg was divided in 1839: the eastern half remained a sovereign grand duchy under the Dutch crown, while the western part fell to Belgium as the province of Luxembourg, much to the displeasure of many Luxembourgers. This border, finally marked by boundary stones in 1843, laid the foundation for the neighborly relationship between the two states that continues to this day.

Luxembourg under Dutch rule was also a member of the German Confederation and was declared neutral by the great powers in 1867, similar to Belgium in 1839. The personal union with the Netherlands ended in 1890 when the succession to the throne fell apart due to different rules of succession. Grand Duke Adolphe of the House of Nassau-Weilburg then took over the Luxembourg throne, establishing a new dynasty in Luxembourg. After the end of the Dutch-Luxembourg connection, Luxembourg's foreign policy became more closely aligned with Belgium, paving the way for close cooperation in the 20th century.

=== 20th and 21st centuries ===
During the First World War, both neutral Luxembourg and Belgium were occupied by Germany. After the end of the war, Luxembourg dissolved its customs union with the German Empire in 1919 and sought ties with Belgium. In 1921, both countries signed the Belgium-Luxembourg Economic Union (Union Économique Belgo-Luxembourgeoise, UEBL), which established a common single market and a monetary union. The Belgian franc was the official currency in Luxembourg, and the Luxembourg franc was also accepted in Belgium for 80 years until the introduction of the euro in 2002. During the Second World War, Belgium and Luxembourg were once again occupied by German troops; both governments went into exile. Even during the war, the neighbors agreed with the Netherlands on a customs union (“Benelux”), which was agreed in London in 1944 and came into force in 1948. In the post-war period, they further developed their cooperation and were among the six founding members of the European Coal and Steel Community in 1952 and the European Economic Community in 1958. Their early economic integration in the UEBL was considered a pioneering precursor to European unification and the nucleus of the European Single Market. In 1960, the Benelux Treaty came into force, establishing a complete economic union between all three Benelux countries and replacing the Benelux Agreement of 1932. The Schengen Agreement abolished all border controls between the Benelux countries, France, and Germany in 1985 and was later extended to other European countries. Today, both countries cooperate closely within the framework of the European Union and NATO. Since 2011, annual ministerial meetings between the two countries have been held in Gaichel and there are regular state visits between the two countries. In 2012, a revised Benelux Treaty came into force.

== Economic relations ==
Economic relations between Belgium and Luxembourg are traditionally extremely close. A cornerstone is the Belgian-Luxembourg Economic Union (UEBL) of 1921, which has been renewed several times since then (most recently in 2022) and continues to serve as the foundation for bilateral economic cooperation. Within the framework of the UEBL, both countries closely coordinate their financial, trade, and monetary policies. For example, Luxembourg citizens in countries without their own embassy can receive consular assistance from Belgian representations—a unique arrangement that dates back to the UEBL. Belgium and Luxembourg have a common internal market with free movement of goods and capital; and long before the EU single currency, they had created a monetary union with the common franc. Both countries are among each other's most important trading partners. Numerous Belgian companies operate in Luxembourg, and conversely, Luxembourg companies are often managed by Belgians. In 2023, around 48,000 Belgian workers commuted to Luxembourg every day, reflecting the close integration of the labor markets. Higher education qualifications have also been recognized across borders since 2015.

== Cultural relations ==
Cultural relations between Belgium and Luxembourg are characterized by shared traditions, dynastic ties, and close personal exchanges. Both neighboring countries share language areas—French is the official language in Belgium and Luxembourg, and German is also spoken in Luxembourg and eastern Belgium—which facilitates cultural dialogue. The dynastic ties between the monarchies strengthen the special closeness: in 1953, Grand Duke Jean married Belgian Princess Joséphine-Charlotte, the eldest daughter of King Leopold III. The marriage of the Luxembourgish Hereditary Grand Duke Guillaume to the Belgian Countess Stéphanie de Lannoy in October 2012 was also considered a symbolic event for both countries. Close family ties between the royal families and many citizens of both countries strengthen mutual trust. In 2018, for example, around 20,000 Belgian citizens live in Luxembourg, while conversely, numerous Luxembourgers are involved in Belgium for professional and private reasons. Luxembourgers also like to visit Belgian beaches, while many Belgians go hiking in Luxembourg's forests.

== International organizations ==
Both countries are founding members of the European Union, NATO, the Council of Europe, the OSCE, and the United Nations.

== Resident diplomatic missions ==
- Belgium has an embassy in Luxembourg City.
- Luxembourg has an embassy in Brussels.

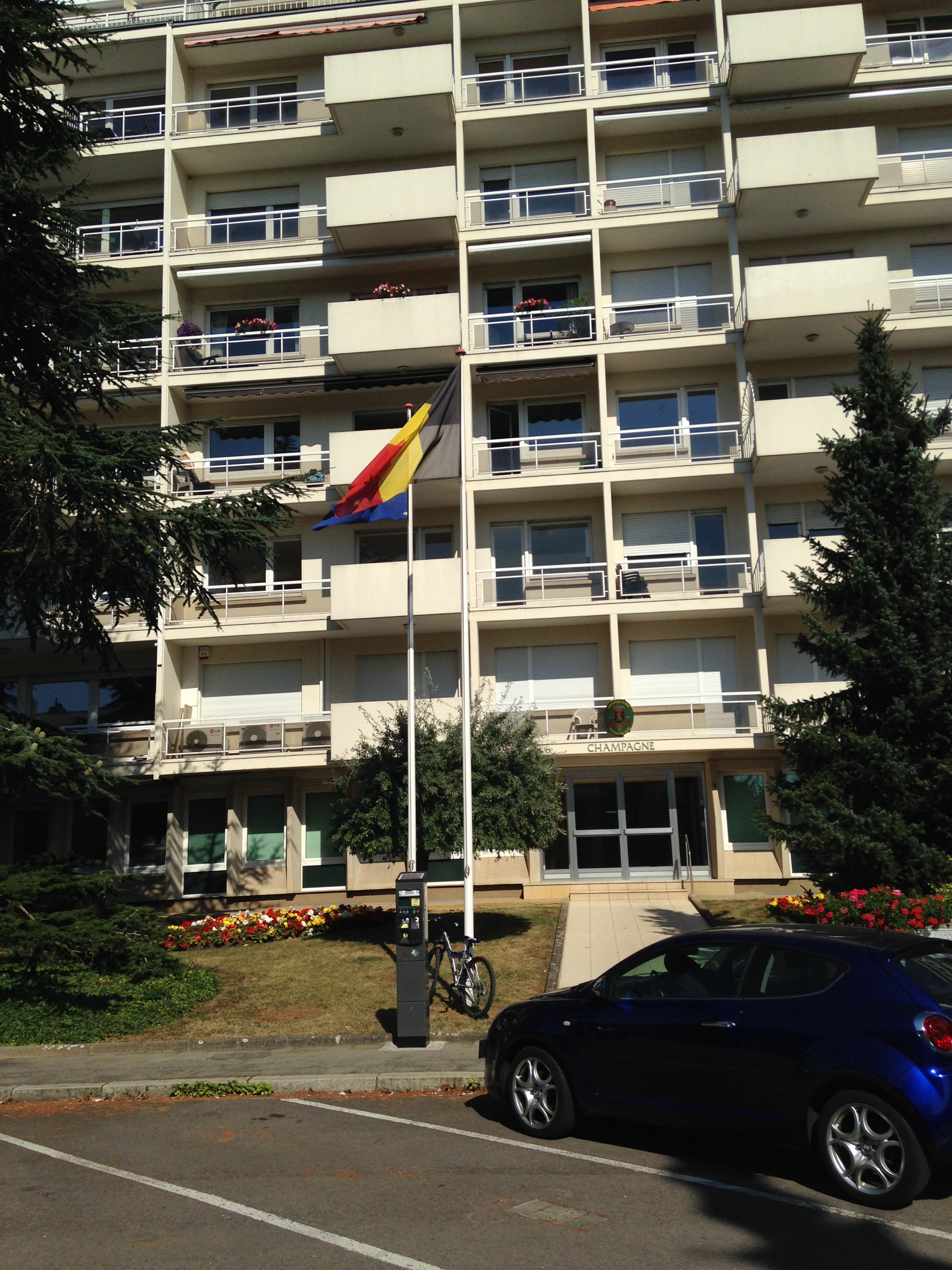
Embassy of Belgium, Luxembourg

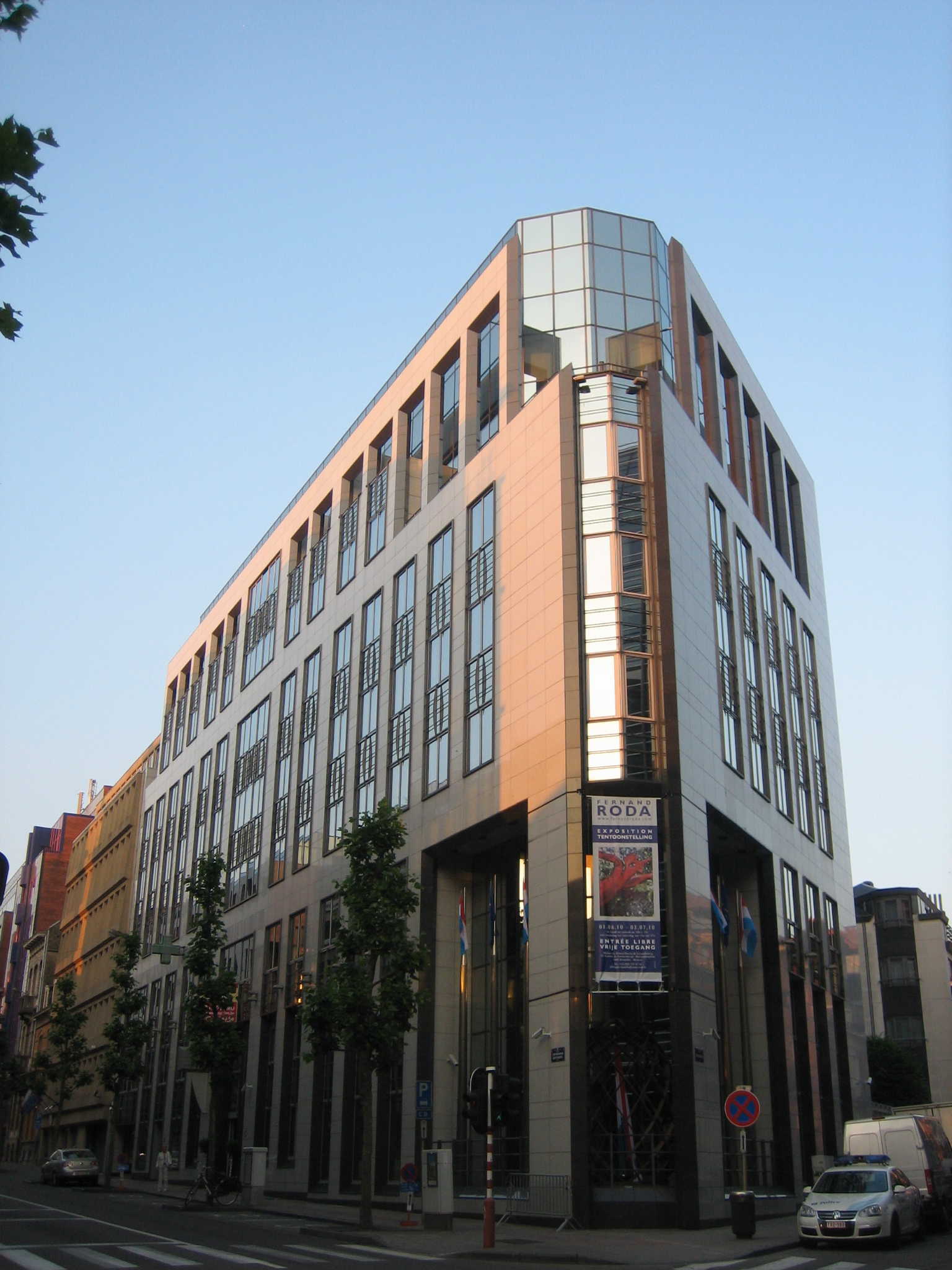
Maison du Luxembourg in Brussels, which houses the Luxembourg Embassy to Belgium.

== See also ==
- Greater Region of SaarLorLux
- Foreign relations of Belgium
- Foreign relations of Luxembourg
