= International Investment Agreements of Azerbaijan =

Azerbaijan has concluded the following Bilateral Investment Treaties (BITs), Treaties with Investment Provisions (TIPs) and Investment Related Instruments (IRIs) according to the database of UNCTAD.

== Overview ==
International organizations such as the World Trade Organization periodically evaluate developments in trade and investment, trends and patterns in FDI and the investment regime for a particular country.

The U.S. government also periodically assesses investment conditions, openness to foreign investment, policies toward foreign direct investment, investment and tax treaties and trade facilitation measures.

== Bilateral Investment Treaties ==
No.	Short title	Status	Parties	Date of signature	Date of entry into force
1	Azerbaijan - Turkmenistan BIT (2018)	In force	Turkmenistan	22/11/2018	10/04/2019
2	Afghanistan - Azerbaijan BIT (2017)	Signed (not in force)	Afghanistan	01/12/2017	
3	Azerbaijan - San Marino BIT (2015)	In force	San Marino	25/09/2015	25/02/2016
4	Azerbaijan - Russian Federation BIT (2014)	In force	Russian Federation	29/09/2014	16/11/2015
5	Azerbaijan - Macedonia, The former Yugoslav Republic of BIT (2013)	In force	North Macedonia	19/04/2013	12/08/2013
6	Albania - Azerbaijan BIT (2012)	In force	Albania	09/02/2012	13/07/2012
7	Azerbaijan - Turkey BIT (2011)	In force	Türkiye	25/10/2011	02/05/2013
8	Azerbaijan - Montenegro BIT (2011)	In force	Montenegro	16/09/2011	02/11/2012
9	Azerbaijan - Serbia BIT (2011)	In force	Serbia	08/06/2011	14/12/2011
10	Azerbaijan - Czech Republic BIT (2011)	In force	Czechia	17/05/2011	09/02/2012
11	Azerbaijan - Belarus BIT (2010)	In force	Belarus	03/06/2010	01/07/2011
12	Azerbaijan - Estonia BIT (2010)	In force	Estonia	07/04/2010	30/06/2011
13	Azerbaijan - Syrian Arab Republic BIT (2009)	In force	Syrian Arab Republic	08/07/2009	04/01/2010
14	Azerbaijan - Kuwait BIT (2009)	In force	Kuwait	10/02/2009	02/03/2013
15	Azerbaijan - Jordan BIT (2008)	In force	Jordan	05/05/2008	25/12/2008
16	Azerbaijan - Croatia BIT (2007)	In force	Croatia	02/10/2007	30/05/2008
17	Azerbaijan - Qatar BIT (2007)	In force	Qatar	28/08/2007	06/04/2018
18	Azerbaijan - Hungary BIT (2007)	In force	Hungary	18/05/2007	26/02/2008
19	Azerbaijan - Korea, Republic of BIT (2007)	In force	Korea, Republic of	23/04/2007	25/01/2008
20	Azerbaijan - Tajikistan BIT (2007)	In force	Tajikistan	15/03/2007	26/02/2008
21	Azerbaijan - Israel BIT (2007)	In force	Israel	20/02/2007	16/01/2009
22	Azerbaijan - United Arab Emirates BIT (2006)	In force	United Arab Emirates	20/11/2006	24/08/2007
23	Azerbaijan - Lithuania BIT (2006)	In force	Lithuania	08/06/2006	01/07/2007
24	Azerbaijan - Switzerland BIT (2006)	In force	Switzerland	23/02/2006	25/06/2007
25	Azerbaijan - Latvia BIT (2005)	In force	Latvia	03/10/2005	10/05/2006
26	Azerbaijan - Saudi Arabia BIT (2005)	In force	Saudi Arabia	09/03/2005	20/05/2011
27	Azerbaijan - Bulgaria BIT (2004)	Signed (not in force)	Bulgaria	07/10/2004	
28	Azerbaijan - Greece BIT (2004)	In force	Greece	21/06/2004	03/09/2006
29	Azerbaijan - BLEU (Belgium-Luxembourg Economic Union) BIT (2004)	In force	BLEU (Belgium-Luxembourg Economic Union)	18/05/2004	27/05/2009
30	Azerbaijan - Finland BIT (2003)	In force	Finland	26/02/2003	10/12/2004
31	Azerbaijan - Romania BIT (2002)	In force	Romania	29/10/2002	29/01/2004
32	Azerbaijan - Egypt BIT (2002)	Signed (not in force)	Egypt	24/10/2002	
33	Austria - Azerbaijan BIT (2000)	In force	Austria	04/07/2000	28/05/2001
34	Azerbaijan - France BIT (1998)	In force	France	01/09/1998	24/08/2000
35	Azerbaijan - Lebanon BIT (1998)	Signed (not in force)	Lebanon	11/02/1998	
36	Azerbaijan - Moldova, Republic of BIT (1997)	In force	Moldova, Republic of	27/11/1997	28/01/1999
37	Azerbaijan - Italy BIT (1997)	Terminated	Italy	25/09/1997	04/02/2000
38	Azerbaijan - Kyrgyzstan BIT (1997)	In force	Kyrgyzstan	28/08/1997	28/08/1997
39	Azerbaijan - Poland BIT (1997)	In force	Poland	26/08/1997	10/02/1999
40	Azerbaijan - United States BIT (1997)	In force	United States of America	01/08/1997	02/08/2001
41	Azerbaijan - Ukraine BIT (1997)	In force	Ukraine	24/03/1997	09/12/1997
42	Azerbaijan - Iran, Islamic Republic of BIT (1996)	In force	Iran, Islamic Republic of	28/10/1996	20/06/2002
43	Azerbaijan - Norway BIT (1996)	Signed (not in force)	Norway	25/09/1996	
44	Azerbaijan - Kazakhstan BIT (1996)	In force	Kazakhstan	16/09/1996	30/04/1998
45	Azerbaijan - Uzbekistan BIT (1996)	In force	Uzbekistan	27/05/1996	02/11/1996
46	Azerbaijan - Georgia BIT (1996)	In force	Georgia	08/03/1996	10/07/1996
47	Azerbaijan - United Kingdom BIT (1996)	In force	United Kingdom	04/01/1996	11/12/1996
48	Azerbaijan - Germany BIT (1995)	In force	Germany	22/12/1995	29/07/1998
49	Azerbaijan - Pakistan BIT (1995)	Signed (not in force)	Pakistan	09/10/1995	
50	Azerbaijan - China BIT (1994)	In force	China	08/03/1994	01/04/1995
51	Azerbaijan - Turkey BIT (1994)	Terminated	Türkiye	09/02/1994	08/09/1997

== Treaties with Investment Provisions ==
No.	Short title	Status	Parties	Date of signature	Date of entry into force
1	Azerbaijan - United Arab Emirates CEPA (2025)	In force	United Arab Emirates	09/07/2025	15/04/2026
3	ECO Investment Agreement (2005)	Signed (not in force)		07/07/2005	
4	Azerbaijan - EC Cooperation Agreement (1996)	In force	EU (European Union)	22/04/1996	01/07/1999
5	The Energy Charter Treaty (1994)	In force		17/12/1994	16/04/1998

== Investment Related Instruments ==
No.	Short title	Date of adoption	Level	Type
1	Azerbaijan Model BIT 2016	2016	National	Model agreements
2	Islamic Corporation for the Insurance of Investment Credit	1992	Regional/Plurilateral	Intergovernmental agreements
3	MIGA Convention	1985	Multilateral	Intergovernmental agreements
4	New York Convention	1958	Multilateral	Intergovernmental agreements
5	ICSID Convention	1965	Multilateral	Intergovernmental agreements
6	Draft Supplementary Treaty to the Energy Charter Treaty	1998	Regional/Plurilateral	Draft instruments
7	UN Code of Conduct on Transnational Corporations	1983	Multilateral	Draft instruments
8	World Bank Investment Guidelines	1992	Multilateral	Guidelines, principles, resolutions and similar
9	ILO Tripartite Declaration on Multinational Enterprises	2000	Multilateral	Guidelines, principles, resolutions and similar
10	ILO Tripartite Declaration on Multinational Enterprises	2006	Multilateral	Guidelines, principles, resolutions and similar
11	ILO Tripartite Declaration on Multinational Enterprises	1977	Multilateral	Guidelines, principles, resolutions and similar
12	UN Guiding Principles on Business and Human Rights	2011	Multilateral	Guidelines, principles, resolutions and similar
13	Permanent Sovereignty UN Resolution	1962	Multilateral	Guidelines, principles, resolutions and similar
14	New International Economic Order UN Resolution	1974	Multilateral	Guidelines, principles, resolutions and similar
15	Charter of Economic Rights and Duties of States	1974	Multilateral	Guidelines, principles, resolutions and similar

== See also ==
- Foreign relations of Azerbaijan
- Economy of Azerbaijan
