= London Customs Convention =

1944 treaty establishing the Benelux Customs Union

Netherlands–Belgium–Luxembourg Customs Convention
- Type: Customs union treaty
- Signed: 5 September 1944
- Location: London, United Kingdom
- Effective: 1948
- Condition: Ratified by all parties
- Parties: Belgium; Netherlands; Luxembourg

Officially titled the Netherlands–Belgium–Luxembourg Customs Convention, the London Customs Convention was the treaty that established the Benelux Customs Union on 5 September 1944. The word "Benelux" comes from an acronym of the countries' names, Belgium, Netherlands, and Luxembourg.

== Background ==
After World War I, the Belgium-Luxembourg Economic Union formed in 1921, establishing a fixed parity between the Belgian franc and Luxembourgian franc, which was only revised in 1935 and 1944. The success of this union inspired the governments of Belgium, Luxembourg, and the Netherlands, all in exile from World War II in 1944, to meet in London and create the larger Benelux Customs Union. Ratified in The Hague in 1947, the London Customs Convention came into force in 1948 and lasted until 1960 when it was superseded by the stronger Benelux Economic Union, signed in The Hague in 1958. Besides initiating the Benelux Parliament in 1955, the Benelux countries went on to found the European Coal and Steel Community with France, Italy, and West Germany, foreshadowing the modern European Union.
