= Benelux Court of Justice =

Court serving Belgium, Luxembourg, and Netherlands

- Formation: 1 January 1974
- Type: Intergovernmental organization, court of the Benelux countries
- Headquarters: Luxembourg
- Coordinates: 49.6181485°N 6.1461076°E
- Members: Belgium, Netherlands and Luxembourg
- Official languages: Dutch and French
- President: J. De Codt
- 1st Vice President: E.J. Numann
- 2nd Vice President: L. Mousel
- Website: official website

The Benelux Court of Justice (Dutch: Benelux Gerechtshof, French: Cour de Justice Benelux) is a court which is common to the Benelux countries, i.e. Belgium, the Netherlands, and Luxembourg. The organisation was established by the treaty of 31 March 1965. The court's budget rests with the Benelux Union and the court is composed of 9 judges of the supreme courts as well as (since 2017) 6 judges of the courts of appeal of the three countries. The court is mainly tasked with answering requests for preliminary rulings from the supreme courts regarding regulations which are common to the three countries and serves as a civil service tribunal for personnel of the Benelux Economic Union and the Benelux Organization for Intellectual Property (BOIP), although it may also be tasked with advising the three governments, and with direct judicial tasks following the entry into force in 2016 of a 2012 protocol to the treaty.

== Organization ==
Since December 2016, the activities of the court are organized in three chambers:

- The First Chamber is composed of 9 judges of the high courts of the three countries, and deals with preliminary questions of the high courts as well as appeals of decisions of the second chamber. The chamber also consists of at least 9 substitute judges.
- The Second Chamber is composed of 6 judges of the Courts of Appeal of the three countries, and is to hear cases in first instance after specific treaties have attributed direct jurisdiction to the court. As no such protocol has entered into force, no court cases are handled by the Second Chamber. The chamber also consists of at least 6 substitute judges.
- The Third Chamber is tasked with cases regarding personnel of the Benelux Union and the BOIP, and consists of judges from both the first and the second chamber.

The court furthermore has three advocates general who give advisory opinions in certain cases. The use of three chambers within an international court has been modelled on the organisation of the Court of Justice of the European Union (where the First Chambre can be compared to the European Court of Justice, the Second Chambre to the General Court, and the Third to the -former- Civil Service Tribunal).

== Competence ==
The court has competence to answer questions regarding laws which are common to the three countries. The competence needs to be explicitly designated in a multilateral treaty, a decision or recommendation of the Committee of Ministers of the Benelux Union. The court has divided the opinions it has given in nine categories:

- Penalty payments (Dutch: dwangsom)
- Liability insurance for motorised vehicles
- Movement of persons
- Mutual assistance in tax matters
- Hunting and bird conservation
- Equal fiscal treatment of companies
- Intellectual property (Benelux Trademarks and Industrial design rights (Dutch: tekeningen of modellen)

As from June 2018, the Court also has the competence to rule on appeals against final decisions of the Benelux Office for Intellectual Property.

== Decisions ==
As of November 2025, the court has given 370 judgments: 175 preliminary rulings, 137 appeals against final decisions of the BOIP, 56 decisions as a civil service tribunal, 1 advisory opinion, and 1 decision regarding the rules of the court.

Decisions are indexed through the European Case Law Identifier-search engine. ECLI-codes start with "ECLI:BU:CBNL" followed by the publication year and a number (eg: ECLI:BU:CBNL:2026:13535).

== Status in the European Union ==
The court is considered a "court common to several member states" of the European Union, and thus forms part of the European legal order. The court therefore can request a preliminary ruling to the European Court of Justice for the application of European Union law, also when it needs such a ruling in order to answer requests for preliminary rulings itself, asked by supreme courts of Benelux countries. The European Court of Justice decided so in a 1995 case (C‑337/95, Parfums Christian Dior). In the latter case, the European Court of Justice ruled that in the interpretation of the Uniform Benelux Law on Trade Marks, both the Supreme Court of the Netherlands and the Benelux Court of Justice (the authority to give preliminary rulings upon requests from the supreme courts regarding this Benelux law) were under an obligation to ask for a preliminary ruling in the interpretation of EU legislation.

The Court for the first time requested a preliminary ruling in 2000 in the case Campina Melkunie v Benelux-Merkenbureau (C-265/00) regarding the rejection of the registration of the Benelux-trademark application by Campina of Biomild. In this case the Supreme Court of the Netherlands had referred on 19 June 1998 nine questions to the Benelux Court of Justice, and in order to answer three of those, it made a request to the European Court of Justice. The three questions were answered by European Court of Justice on 12 February 2004, and the Benelux Court of Justice answered the 9 questions on 1 December 2004. The Supreme Court of the Netherlands in turn gave its ruling, based on those answers on 27 January 2006. The court upheld the rejection of the registration of the trade mark.
