= TM-XML =

The Trade Mark Extensible Markup Language (TM-XML) is an XML open standard for the trademark business and for the exchange of trademark information between the Industrial Property Offices and its partners or users.

== Objectives ==
The initial objective was the definition of XML Standard for trademark information exchange. During the specifications and after the creation of WIPO Standard ST.66, other objectives have been added as following:

- Define XML Standards for Trade Mark Offices and Trade Mark Business
- Propose Useful Outcomes as Base for the Creation of WIPO Standards
- Define Trademark Web Service Standards
- Provide Examples of Implementations and Tools
- Share Experiences, Practices and Knowledge
- Promote Collaboration and Harmonization of Trade Mark Information and Knowledge Representations
- Prepare the Emerging Semantic Web for the Trade Mark Domain in the Intellectual Property Context (hTrademark Microformat, TM-RDF, TM-OWL)

== History ==
TM-XML was defined by a working group created by the European Union Intellectual Property Office in June 2003. 8 draft versions for comment have been published (versions 0.1 to 0.7 and 1.0 Draft) before the version 1.0 Final published on 26 May 2006 on its website: https://web.archive.org/web/20060827113952/http://www.tm-xml.org/.

TM-XML Version 1.0 Final has been proposed as a base for the creation of a WIPO International Standard named ST.66 which has been adopted by the Standing Committee on Information Technologies / Standards and Documentation Working Group (SCIT/SDWG) during its 8th session on March 19–22, 2007 in Geneva.

== Roadmap 2010-2015 ==
Version	Planned	Content
TM-XML Version 2.0	2010–2012	Complete coverage of all Information related to trademark and its related IP resources (Opposition, Appeal, Recordals, Renewal, Cancellation, etc.).; hTrademark Microformat implementations.; First Web Services and Rules in Resource Description Framework (RDF) and Web Ontology Language (OWL).
TM-XML Version 3.0	2012–2015	Additional Web Services and Semantic Web - Knowledge Representation & Services.

== See also ==
DS-XML : XML Standard for Design / Industrial Design
