= European Union Intellectual Property Office =

European Union agency

Coordinates: 38.314702°N 0.51824°W

- French: Office de l'Union européenne pour la propriété intellectuelle

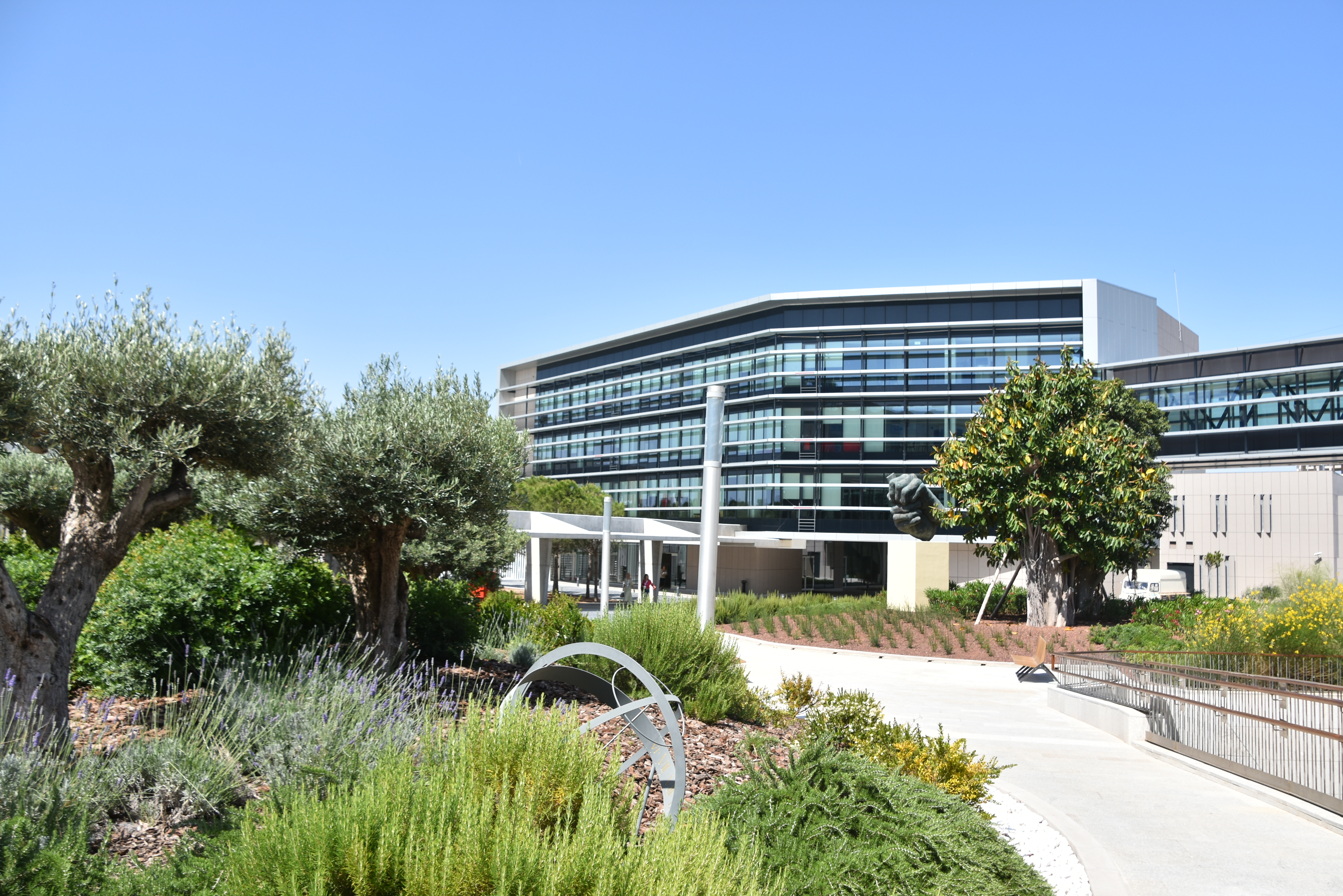
- EUIPO building

Agency overview
- Formed: 15 March 1994
- Preceding agency: Office for Harmonization in the Internal Market (OHIM)
- Type: decentralised agency of the European Union
- Jurisdiction: European Union
- Headquarters: Alicante, Spain
- Employees: 775
- Agency executives: João Negrão, Executive Director; Andrea Di Carlo, Deputy Executive Director; Jorma Hanski, Chairperson, Management Board; José Antonio Gil Celedonio, Chairperson, Budget Committee
- Key document: Regulation (EU) 2017/1001
- Website: euipo.europa.eu

The European Union Intellectual Property Office (EUIPO) (French: Office de l'Union européenne pour la propriété intellectuelle) is a decentralised agency of the EU responsible for the registration of EU-wide unitary trade marks and industrial design rights. These exist alongside the intellectual property rights of individual EU member states, so the agency also works to harmonise EU-wide and national registration processes. Other responsibilities include the administration of the rights of certain products in the EU to carry geographical indications.

EUIPO was founded in 1994 and was formerly known as the Office for Harmonization in the Internal Market (OHIM), but was renamed in March 2016 to reflect major reforms. The EUIPO is based in Alicante, Spain.

== Functions and activities ==
=== Intellectual property registration ===
The Office is in charge of managing the registration of the EU trade mark and the registered Community design and offers businesses and citizens exclusive rights for trade mark and design protection throughout the European Union (EU), with a single application. The European Union trade mark (EUTM) (formerly known as "community trade mark") grants exclusive rights in all current and future Member States of the European Union through a single registration, filed online. An EU trade mark registration lasts for 10 years but can be renewed indefinitely in blocks of 10 years.

=== Geographical indication ===
EUIPO administers geographical indication (GI) registration in the EU for agricultural products whose qualities are specifically linked to their area of production (e.g. certain wines and cheeses) and provides a database of registered GIs. On 16 November 2023, a new EU regulation entered into force which introduced a new geographical indication (GI) protection scheme for craft and industrial products in the EU and giving EUIPO the authority to administer it. Since 1 December 2025 the EUIPO has also registered geographical indications for craft and industrial products. Porcelaine de Limoges became the first name protected under this scheme in May 2026, when 74 applications had been filed.

=== Other activities ===
Since 2012, the EUIPO has managed the European Observatory on Infringements of Intellectual Property Rights, a network of public and private stakeholders working against piracy and counterfeiting.

The DesignEuropa Awards are organised by the EUIPO every two years to celebrate excellence in design and design management among registered Community design (RCD) holders, whether they are individual rights holders, small businesses or large enterprises. The first edition of the awards took place in Milan in 2016.

== History of key regulations ==
The regulation establishing the EUIPO was adopted by the Council of the European Union in December 1993 and revised on two occasions, in 2009 and in 2015. It created the European Union trade mark (formerly known as the Community trade mark) as a legal instrument in European Union law and established the EUIPO (then known as Office for Harmonisation in the Internal Market, or OHIM) as an EU agency with legal, administrative and financial autonomy. Council Regulation (EC) No 6/2002 of 12 December 2001 created the registered Community design.

On 23 March 2016, the Office changed its name to the European Union Intellectual Property Office upon the entry into force of Regulation 2015/2424. The Regulation brought about changes in three areas:

1. Trade mark fees: The fee system changed from a basic fee that covered up to three classes of goods and services to a 'pay-per-class' system, with an online fee of EUR 850 for one class, EUR 50 for the second class, and EUR 150 each for three or more classes.
2. Technical: As well as changes in the graphic representation of the mark, examination proceedings, absolute grounds of refusal, relative grounds of refusal, goods and services, opposition and cancellation proceedings and appeals. It also created the certification mark system, permitting certifying institutions to use a new type of trade mark at EU level for goods or services complying with certification requirements.
3. Institutional: The Regulation clearly defined all the tasks of the EUIPO, including the framework for cooperation and convergence of practices with national and regional IP offices in the EU.

In 2017 this was replaced by Regulation (EU) 2017/1001, which consolidated and updated the previous regulations.

On 23 March 2016, the agency changed its name to the European Union Intellectual Property Office upon the entry into force of Regulation 2015/2424. Several positions and the governing board were also renamed to mirror these changes; for example, the title of the head of the agency was changed from President to executive director.

== Governance and structure ==
The governance structure of the EUIPO consists of a management board and a Budget Committee, each composed of one representative from each Member State, two representatives from the European Commission and one representative from the European Parliament.

The Council of the European Union decides on the appointment of the executive director, the Deputy Executive Director, and the President and Chairpersons of the Boards of Appeal.

=== Boards of Appeal ===
The OHIM Board of Appeal is an administrative law body of the Office for Harmonization in the Internal Market (OHIM), which is responsible for deciding on appeals in trade mark and design matters registered in the European Union. They are able to make decisions based on points of law and points of fact.

The Boards of Appeal are headed by the President of the Boards of Appeal, appointed by the Council of Ministers from a list prepared by the Administrative Board of OHIM.

The individual Boards are chaired by members appointed by the Council of Ministers. Other members of individual Boards are appointed by the Administrative Board of OHIM. Boards are allowed to hear new evidence at their discretion, although not obligated to do so.

The Boards of Appeal are made up of four Boards for trade mark cases and one for design. There is an additional Grand Board which may hear any cases appealed through OHIM. A case heard by a Board of Appeal is made up of three members. This includes the chairperson, who must sit on every case. Two members of the Board must be legally qualified, though in some instances cases can be decided by the Grand Board or a single member.

The Grand Board is made up of nine members. It includes the presidents and chairpersons of the Boards, as well as some ordinary board members. The Board was set up by Council Regulation 422/2004. Cases are referred to the Grand Board based on legal difficulty, importance, or under special circumstances. In some cases, the Presidium may refer a case to the Grand Board.

The Presidium oversees the rules and organisation of the Boards of Appeal. It consists of the President of the Boards of Appeal, the Chairpersons of the Boards, and three board members elected for a calendar year.

== See also ==
- Benelux Office for Intellectual Property
- Community Plant Variety Office (CPVO)
- Intellectual property organisation
- Trade Mark eXtended Markup Language Standard
- United States Patent and Trademark Office
