= Directive on the legal protection of designs =

Directive 98/71/EC
- European Union directive
- Made by: European Parliament & Council
- Made under: Art. 100a
- Journal reference: L289, 28 October 1998, pp. 28–35

History
- Date made: 1998-10-13
- Entry into force: 1998-11-17
- Implementation date: 2001-10-28

Preparative texts
- Commission proposal: C345, 1993-12-23, p. 14. C142, 1996-05-14, p. 7.
- EESC opinion: C388, 1994-12-31, p. 9. C110, 1995-05-02, p. 12.
- EP opinion: C339, 1995-10-30, p. 157. C339, 1997-11-10, p. 52.
- Reports

Other legislation
- Replaces: —
- Amends: —
- Amended by: —
- Replaced by: —

Directive 98/71/EC of the European Parliament and of the Council of 13 October 1998 on the legal protection of designs is a European Union directive in the field of industrial design rights, made under the internal market provisions of the Treaty of Rome. It sets harmonised standards for eligibility and protection of most types of registered design.

== Eligible designs ==
A design is defined as "the appearance of the whole or a part of a product resulting from the features of, in particular, the lines, contours, colours, shape, texture and/or materials of the product itself and/or its ornamentation" (Art. 1(a)).

Designs may be protected if:

- they are novel, that is if no identical design has been made available to the public;
- they have individual character, that is the "informed user" would find it different from other designs which are available to the public.

Where a design forms part of a more complex product, the novelty and individual character of the design are judged on the part of the design which is visible during normal use. The precise meaning of "normal use" in this context was considered in the European Court of Justice in 2021.

Designs are not protected insofar as their appearance is wholly determined by their technical function, or by the need to interconnect with other products to perform a technical function (the "must-fit" exception). However modular systems such as Lego or Mechano may be protected.

== Design right protection ==
The holder of a registered design right has the exclusive right to authorise or prohibit others from using the design in any way, notably by producing, importing, selling or using products based on the design. However, rightholders may not prevent private and non-commercial use, use for research or use for teaching. There is also an exception for foreign-registered ships and aeroplanes, based on the principles of maritime sovereignty.

Protection under a registered design right lasts initially for one or more periods of five years, and may be renewed up to a maximum total of twenty-five years. In respect of a given product, they are exhausted when it is sold with the consent of the rightholder (the first-sale doctrine).

Protection by a registered design right does not affect any other intellectual property rights in the product, notably unregistered design rights, patents and trade marks. The question of copyright protection is left to the laws of the Member States, which apply varying criteria of originality to the copyright protection of "applied art"; the point, however, is that the existence of the registered design right does not stop the design also being eligible for copyright protection.

== Review ==
The Directive leaves the question of component parts mostly without harmonisation, given the widely varying practices between Member States.

== See also ==
- Industrial design rights in the European Union
- Community design
