= Belgium–Luxembourg Economic Union =

Economic union between Belgium and Luxembourg

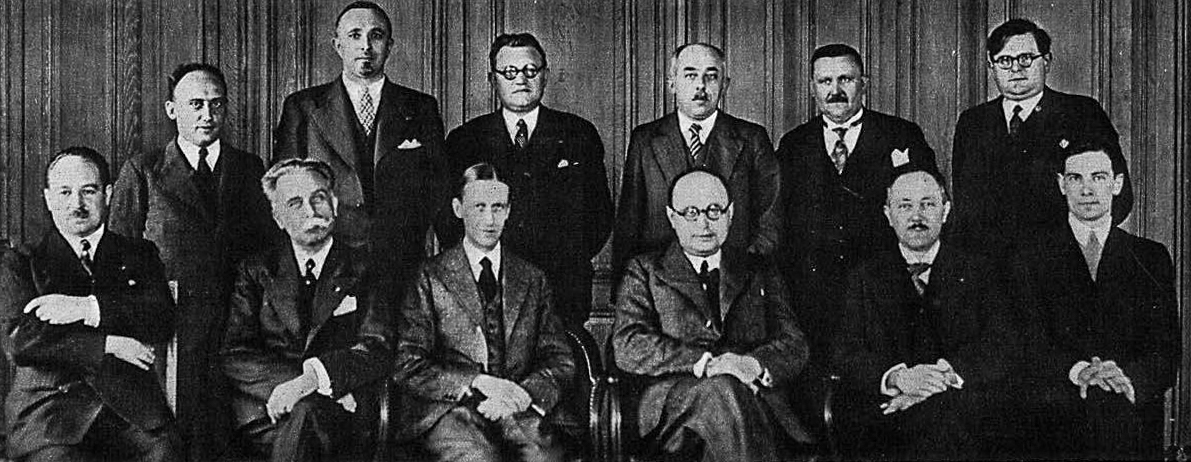

The Belgium–Luxembourg Economic Union (Dutch: Belgisch-Luxemburgse Economische Unie, French: Union économique belgo-luxembourgeoise, German: Belgisch-Luxemburgische Wirtschaftsunion, Luxembourgish: Belsch-Lëtzebuerger Wirtschaftsunioun), abbreviated to BLEU or UEBL, is an economic union between Belgium and Luxembourg, two countries in the Benelux Union.

BLEU was created by a treaty, signed on 25 July 1921, despite a referendum in Luxembourg initially favouring closer collaboration with France rather than Belgium. It came into effect upon ratification by the Luxembourg Chamber of Deputies on 22 December 1922. Under the terms of the treaty, the economic frontier was lifted and the Belgian franc and Luxembourg franc were set at a fixed parity in 1929 (though revised in 1935 and 1944) establishing a fixed exchange rate system, which existed until the introduction of the euro. The original treaty lasted for fifty years, expiring in 1972; this was extended for ten years in 1982 and again in 1992. On 18 December 2002, the two countries signed a new convention.

It has been seen as the forerunner of the Benelux Union, which was established as the Benelux Customs Union in 1944 by the London Customs Convention and also includes the Netherlands. While many aims of the BLEU have been subsumed by the Benelux Union, and later the European Union, it still has some relevance in being able to decide more precise measures than these organisations. International trade statistics were available for BLEU only as a combined entity until 1999 when European Community rules required split information.

== History ==
Compared with the German customs union (of which Luxembourg was a member until 1866), the BLEU had several advantages for Luxembourg. Belgium was only allowed to alter its customs tariffs or conclude trade treaties after consultation with the Luxembourgish government, whereas before 1918 Luxembourg had to go along with German decisions. Similarly, only Luxembourgish customs agents would operate in Luxembourg, while under the Zollverein Prussian officials had operated in Luxembourg.

The functioning of the BLEU was entrusted to a board of directors consisting of two Belgian members (including the chairman) and one Luxembourgish member, and the Higher Council of the Union (with three Belgian and two Luxembourgish members).

== See also ==
- Belgium–Luxembourg relations
- European Coal and Steel Community

== References and further reading ==
- Kreins, Jean-Marie (2003). Histoire du Luxembourg (in French) (3rd ed.). Paris: Presses Universitaires de France. ISBN 978-2-13-053852-3.
- Trausch, Gilbert (1 July 1984). "Du Zollverein à l'Union Economique Belgo-Luxembourgeoise (1914-1922)". Hémecht (in French). 36 (4): 343ff.
