= Benelux Office for Intellectual Property =

Intellectual property organization of Belgium, the Netherlands, and Luxembourg

Benelux Office for Intellectual Property Dutch: Benelux-Bureau voor de Intellectuele Eigendom (BBIE) French: Office Benelux de la Propriété intellectuelle
- Abbreviation: BOIP; BX
- Formation: 25 February 2005
- Headquarters: The Hague, Netherlands
- Region served: Belgium, the Netherlands, Luxembourg
- Official language: English, Dutch, French
- Director General: Edmond Simon
- Budget: €14 million (2013)
- Staff: 92 (2013)
- Website: www.boip.int/en

The Benelux Office for Intellectual Property (BOIP) is the registration office for trademarks and designs in Belgium, the Netherlands, and Luxembourg. The BOIP is the legal successor of the Benelux Trademarks Office (Dutch: Benelux-Merkenbureau, French: Bureau Benelux des Marques) and the Benelux Designs Office (Dutch: Benelux-Bureau voor Tekeningen of Modellen, French: Bureau Benelux des Dessins ou Modèles). The BOIP is based at The Hague, Netherlands.

The BOIP is part of the Benelux Organisation for Intellectual Property, established by the Benelux Convention on Intellectual Property, which was signed on 25 February 2005 and entered into force on 1 September 2006. The Benelux Convention on Intellectual Property replaced the Benelux Convention on Trade Marks (1962) and the Benelux Convention on Designs (1966). It is not connected to the Benelux Union. However, as from June 2018, the Benelux Court of Justice has the competence to judge BOIP's decisions in appeal.

== Other jurisdictions ==
Besides acting for the Benelux territory per se, BOIP also acts as the registration office for trade marks of the Caribbean Netherlands since the dissolution of the Netherlands Antilles on 10 October 2010. Until 10 October 2011 pre-existing Netherlands Antilles' trademarks had to be confirmed with the office in order to remain valid.

Since 1 January 2015, the BOIP also serves as the back office for the Bureau for Intellectual Property of Sint Maarten (BIP SXM), a task which had been performed by the trademark office of Curaçao since 10 October 2010.

== See also ==
- European Union Intellectual Property Office (EUIPO)
