= Belgian coins of World War II =

During World War II, the Belgian government needed to mint coins using metal that would not be needed for the war effort. Therefore, silver coinage was discontinued and coins were instead minted using pure zinc.

In 1944, shortly before the Liberation, the Allies minted 25 million 2 franc coins at the Philadelphia Mint, which were put in circulation after Belgium regained its independence.

== Occupation coinage ==
=== One Franc ===
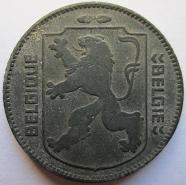
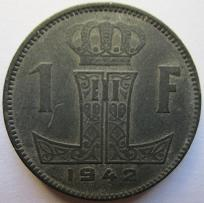
The 1 franc coin, showing arms of Brabant and the state title on the obverse and the royal monogram on the reverse.

The 1 Franc coin was circulated through Belgium from 1941.

Belgique-Belgie lettering

Year	Mintage	Notes
1941	16,000,000	
1942	25,000,000	
1943	28,000,000	
1947	3,175,000	Rare

Belgie-Belgique lettering

Year	Mintage	Notes
1942	42,000,000	
1943	28,000,000	
1944	24,190,000	
1945	15,930,000	
1946	36,000,000	
1947	3,000,000	Rare

=== Five Francs ===
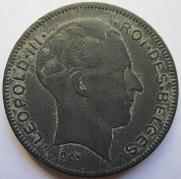
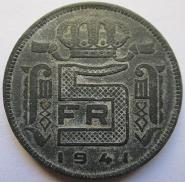
The 5 franc coin, showing the monogramme and bust of King Leopold III

The 5 franc coin was minted between 1941 and 1947, first by the Germans during the occupation of Belgium, and then by the Belgian government after the end of World War II. The coin composed of 100% zinc, and was an emergency issue type.

Year	Mintage	Notes
1941	15,200,000	
1943	16,236,000	
1943		Rare
1944	1,868,000	Rare
1945	3,200,000	Rare
1946	8,452,000	Rare
1947	3,100,000	Rare

=== Five Centimes ===
The 5 centimes coin was minted between 1941 and 1943 during the German occupation. The coin composed of 100% zinc, and was an emergency issue type. There are also two varieties. The Centime is a sub-unit of the franc. It is 1/100 of a franc.

Belgique-Belgie lettering

Year	Mintage	Notes
1941	10,000,000	
1943	7,606,000	

Belgie-Belgique lettering

Year	Mintage	Notes
1941	4,000,000	
1942	18,430,000	

=== Ten Centimes ===
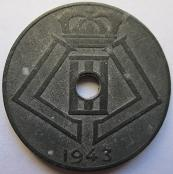
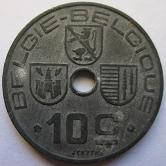
The 10 centime coin, showing three provincial shields in addition to the monogramme of Leopold III

The 10 centimes coin was minted between 1941 and 1946, first by the Germans during the occupation of Belgium, and then by the Belgian government after World War II ended. The coin composed of 100% zinc, and was an emergency issue type. There are also two different varieties.

Belgique-Belgie lettering

Year	Mintage	Notes
1941	10,000,000	
1942	17,000,000	
1943	22,500,000	
1945		Rare
1946	10,370,000	Rare

Belgie-Belgique lettering

Year	Mintage	Notes
1941	7,000,000	
1942	21,000,000	
1943	22,000,000	
1944	28,000,000	
1945	8,000,000	
1946	10,370,000	

=== Twenty-five Centimes ===
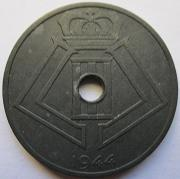
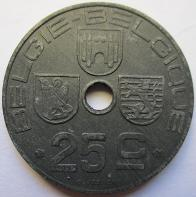
The 25 centime coin, showing three provincial shields in addition to the monogramme of Leopold III

The 25 centimes coin was minted between 1941 and 1947, first by the Germans during the occupation, and then by the Belgian government after World War II ended. The coin composed of 100% zinc, and was an emergency issue type. There are also two different varieties.

Belgique-Belgie lettering

Year	Mintage	Notes
1941		Rare
1942	14,400,000	
1943	21,600,000	
1945		Rare
1946	21,428,000	
1947	300,000	Rare (Not circulated)

Belgie-Belgique lettering

Year	Mintage	Notes
1942	14,400,000	
1943	21,600,000	
1944	25,960,000	
1945	8,200,000	
1946	11,652,000	
1947	316,000 (Est. mintage)	Rare

== Liberation coinage ==
=== Two Francs ===
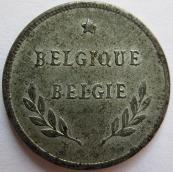
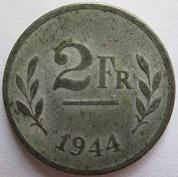
The zinc-coated steel 2 franc coin.

The 2 franc coin was minted by the United States in 1944 in preparation for the Allied liberation of Belgium. The coins were struck at the Philadelphia Mint on zinc-coated steel blanks associated with the later blank specification adopted for the 1943 U.S. steel cent. Surviving specimens exhibit variation in weight, including specimens corresponding to the later, higher-weight blank specification. The available evidence does not indicate that these blanks were specifically manufactured for the 1944 Belgian 2-franc production.

Year	Mintage	Notes
1944	25,000,000	Surviving population unknown; many were surrendered during demonetization, with subsequent disposition unknown.
