= European Union trade mark =

Legal institution of industrial property protection

A European Union trade mark or EU trade mark (abbreviated EUTM; named Community Trade Mark (CTM) until 23 March 2016) is a trade mark which is pending registration or has been registered in the European Union as a whole (rather than on a national level within the EU).

The EU trade mark system creates a unified trade mark registration system in Europe, whereby one registration provides protection in all member states of the EU. The EU trade mark system is unitary in character. Thus, an objection against an EU trade mark application in any member state can defeat the entire application, an EU trade mark registration is enforceable in all member states.

The EU trade mark system is administered by the European Union Intellectual Property Office (EUIPO), which is located in Alicante, Spain (see also trade mark law of the European Union).

== Characteristics ==
The EU trade mark gives its proprietor a uniform right applicable in all member states of the European Union on the strength of a single procedure which simplifies trade mark policies at European level. It fulfils the three essential functions of a trade mark at European level: it identifies the origin of goods and services, guarantees consistent quality through evidence of the company's commitment to the consumer, and is a form of communication, a basis for publicity and advertising.

The EU trade mark may be used as a manufacturer's mark, a mark for goods of a trading company, or service mark.

=== Collective marks ===
The EU trade mark may also take the form of a collective trade mark: properly applied, the regulation governing the use of the collective trade mark guarantees the origin, the nature and the quality of goods and services by making them distinguishable, which is beneficial to members of the association or body owning the trade mark.

=== Certification marks ===
The EU trade mark can also be a certification mark, namely a mark which distinguishes goods or services which are certified by the proprietor of the mark in respect of material, mode of manufacture of goods or performance of services, quality, accuracy or other characteristics, with the exception of geographical origin, from goods and services which are not so certified.

== Advantages and disadvantages ==
The EU trade mark is obtained by registration in the Register kept by EUIPO. When registered, transferred or allowed to lapse, the effect of such action is EU-wide. It is valid for a period of 10 years and may be renewed indefinitely. The rules of law applicable to it are similar to those applied to national trade marks by the Member States. Companies will therefore find themselves in a familiar environment, just on a larger scale.

Another advantage are the fees. The initial cost of filing an application to register an EU trade mark is much less than filing separate national applications in all EU member states (which currently number 27). For filing purposes, the economic advantage of using the EUTM system increases according to the number of member states where a trade mark owner uses or proposes to use its mark. If a trade mark owner will only sell products or deliver services in fewer than three or four member states, consideration should be given to seeking registration in these countries rather than applying for an EU trade mark.

However, the economic advantage of using the EU trade mark system will quickly dissipate if an application is rejected on grounds which do not apply in all EU states (for example following opposition based on earlier conflicting national rights). This is because, although the applicant for a failed EU trade mark application may attempt to salvage the situation by converting the application into one or more national applications in EU states in which the grounds for refusal do not apply, the applicant cannot recover the costs of filing the EU trade mark application and must repay to file in each country where the EU trade mark application is converted.

In addition, the increasing size of the EU increases the probability that there will be third parties who consider that an EU trade mark application conflicts with their trade mark rights, and oppose the application accordingly.

== History ==
The EU Trade Mark concept originated in 1964 in a draft of a "Convention on European Trademark Law". However, it was not until 1980 that the first proposal for a regulation dealing with the EU Trade Mark appeared. Regulation came into effect with Council Regulation (EC) No 40/94 of 20 December 1993 on the Community trade mark:

A trade mark for goods or services which is registered in accordance with the conditions contained in this Regulation and in the manner herein provided is hereinafter referred to as a "Community trade mark"

but it was not until 1 April 1996 that the first CTM applications were processed and the register began to operate.

== See also ==
- European Union Intellectual Property Office
- Madrid system
- World Intellectual Property Organization
