= Belgian franc =

Currency of Belgium from 1832 to 2002

Belgische frank (Dutch); franc belge (French); belgischer Franken (German)
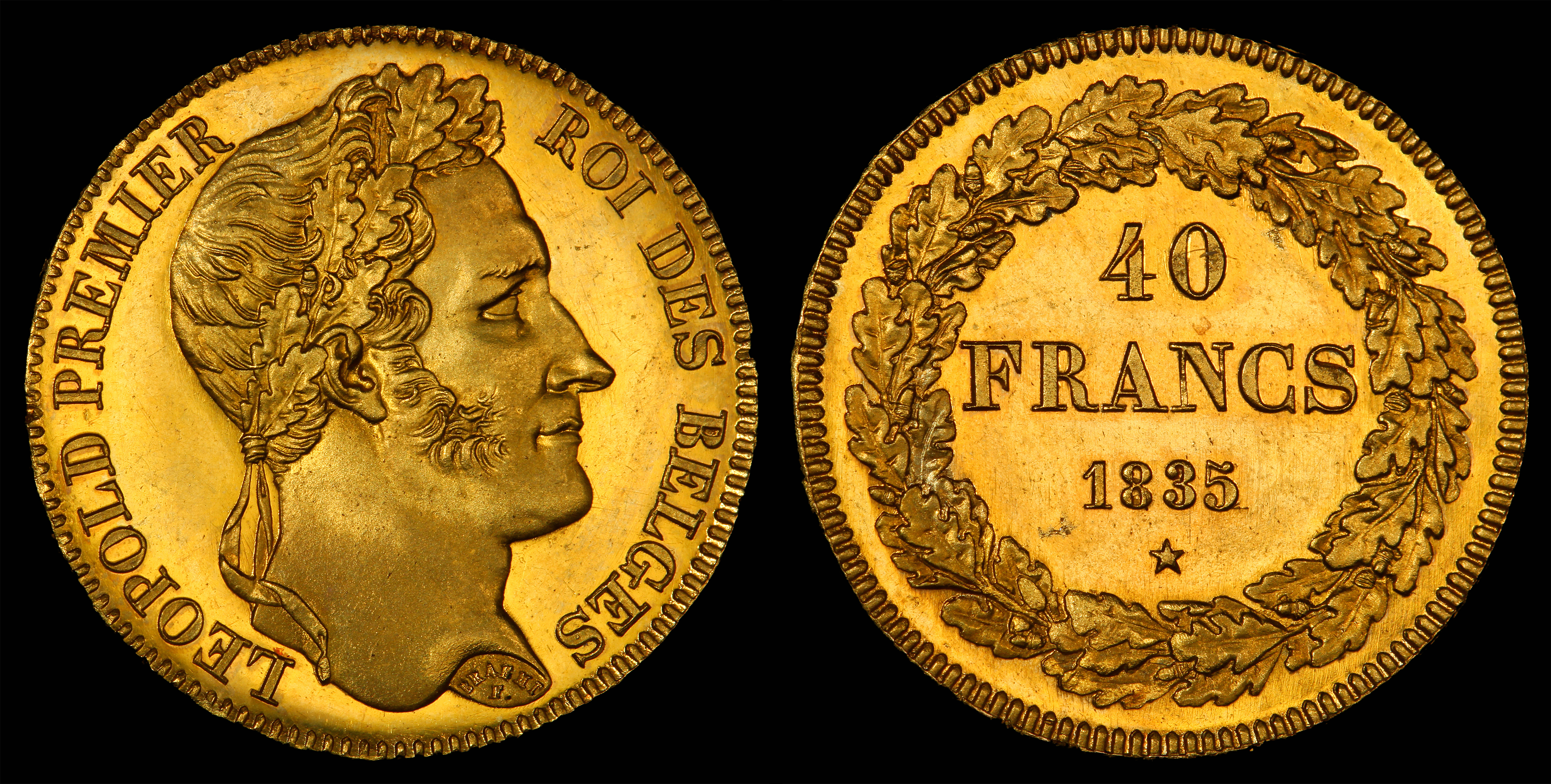
- 40 Belgian francs (1835)

ISO 4217
- Code: BEF

Unit
- Unit: franc
- Plural: francs (French) frank (Dutch) franken (German) (Note: In Dutch, the plural Franken was used until around 1920. Later, the singular noun Frank was used for the plural as well.)
- Symbol: fr.

Denominations
- Subunit
- 1/100: centime (French) centiem (Dutch); Centime (German)
- Plural
- centime (French) centiem (Dutch) Centime (German): centimes (French) centiem (Dutch)
- Symbol
- centime (French) centiem (Dutch) Centime (German): c.
- Banknotes
- Freq. used: 100, 200, 500, 1000, 2000 fr.
- Rarely used: 10,000 fr.
- Coins
- Freq. used: 1, 5, 20, 50 fr.
- Rarely used: 50 centimes

Demographics
- Date of introduction: 5 June 1832
- User(s): None, previously: Belgium, Luxembourg (alongside Luxembourgish Franc)

Issuance
- Central bank: National Bank of Belgium
- Website: www.nbb.be
- Printer: National Bank of Belgium
- Website: www.nbb.be
- Mint: National Bank of Belgium
- Website: www.nbb.be

Valuation

EU Exchange Rate Mechanism (ERM)
- Since: 13 March 1979
- Fixed rate since: 31 December 1998
- Replaced by euro, non cash: 1 January 1999
- Replaced by euro, cash: 1 March 2002
- 1 € =: 40.3399 francs
- This infobox shows the latest status before this currency was rendered obsolete.

The Belgian franc (Note: Dutch: Belgische frank, French: Franc belge, German: Belgischer Franken) was the currency of the Kingdom of Belgium from 1832 until 2002 when the euro was introduced. It was subdivided into 100 subunits, each known as a centiem in Dutch, or centime in French and German.

== History ==
The gulden (guilder) of 20 stuivers was the currency of present-day Belgium from the 15th to 19th centuries until its replacement in 1832 by the Belgian franc. Its value differed from the gulden of the Dutch Republic during the latter's separation from Belgium from 1581 to 1816. Standard coins issued in Belgium include:

- From 1618: the patagon or Albertusthaler of 24.55 g fine silver, worth 2.4 gulden or 48 stuiver (or 10.23 g fine silver per gulden)
- From 1754: the kronenthaler of 25.71 g fine silver, worth 3.15 gulden currency or 2.7 gulden of exchange (9.52 g silver per exchange gulden). The French silver écu of 26.67 g silver was also accepted for 2.8 exchange gulden.
- From 1816 to 1832: the Dutch guilder of 9.613 g silver of the United Kingdom of the Netherlands.

The French franc of 4.5 g silver arrived in Belgium following its occupation during the Napoleonic Wars. Its equivalence of 1 franc = 0.4725 gulden (or 9.52 g silver per exchange gulden, with the gulden currency abolished) doomed the rollout of the higher-valued Dutch guilder, since 20 francs can purchase 9.45 silver guilders which can be melted down to recover 90.84 g fine silver worth 20.19 francs. Following independence from the Kingdom of the Netherlands, the new Kingdom of Belgium abolished the gulden in 1832 in favor of the Belgian franc, which was equivalent to the French franc.

Luxembourg used both French and Belgian francs until it issued its own Luxembourgish franc in 1854. Belgium was the first country to introduce coins made of cupronickel in 1860.

In 1865, Belgium, France, Switzerland and Italy created the Latin Monetary Union (to be joined by Greece in 1868): each would possess a national currency unit (franc, lira, drachma) worth 4.5 g of silver or 290.322 mg of fine gold, all freely exchangeable at a rate of 1:1. In the 1870s the gold value was made the fixed standard, a situation which was to continue until 1914.

In 1926, Belgium, as well as France, experienced depreciation and an abrupt collapse of confidence, leading to the introduction of a new gold currency for international transactions, the Belga worth 5 francs, and the country's withdrawal from the monetary union, which ceased to exist at the end of the year. The Belga was tied to sterling at a rate of 35 belgas (175 francs) = £1 stg and was thus put on a gold standard of 1 Belga = 209.211 mg fine gold. The 1921 monetary union of Belgium and Luxembourg survived, however, forming the basis for full economic union in 1932. In 1935, the Belgian franc was devalued by 28% to 150.632 mg fine gold per Belga and the link between the Luxembourg and Belgian francs was revised to 1 Luxembourg franc = 1.25 Belgian francs.

Following Belgium's occupation by Germany in May 1940, the franc was fixed at a value of 10 Reichspfennige, reduced to 8 Reichspfennige in July 1940. Following liberation in 1944, the franc entered into the Bretton Woods system, with an initial exchange rate of 43.77 francs = US dollar set on 5 October. This was changed to 43.8275 in 1946 and then to 50 following the devaluation of sterling in September 1949. The Belgian franc was devalued again in 1982.

Like 10 other European currencies, the Belgian/Luxembourgish franc ceased to exist on 1 January 1999, when it became fixed at 1 EUR= 40.3399 BEF/LUF, thus a franc was worth €0.024789. Old franc coins and notes lost their legal tender status on 28 February 2002.

=== Language ===
Even though it is a country with three official languages, Belgian coins usually only show both French and Flemish Dutch text, and sometimes one or the other depending on the type or time period to represent which region the coin is meant to represent. In later 20th-century issues, the text is almost without exception divided between two types of coins, with Flemish issues reading België and Frank, and French issues reading Belgique and Franc(s).

Initially, the currency was monolingual in French. From 1886, some Belgian coins also carried Dutch legends. Some later coins featured inscriptions in both languages. When the two languages appeared on either side of the same face of a coin, two versions were still produced: one with Dutch to the left and French to the right, and one with the alternate arrangement. Banknotes became bilingual in 1887 and, from 1992, banknotes were introduced which were trilingual, with either French or Dutch on the obverse and German and the remaining language on the reverse.

Some commemorative coins were issued with German inscriptions but none for circulation.

=== Historic exchange rates ===
The Franc's value compared to the US dollar varied over the years. After 1971, its lowest mark was in February 1985, when one dollar would have bought 66.31 franc. Its highest standing was in July 1980, when it stood at 27.96 to the dollar. In 1990, the Belgian franc was tied to the German mark. After 1 January 1999, the rates are calculated from the Francs fixed conversion rate to the Euro.

Cost of one US dollar, 1 January
1971	1975	1980	1985	1990	1995	2000	2001, 12.01
49.64	35.48	28.02	63.45	35.45	31.54	39.82	45.26

== Coins ==
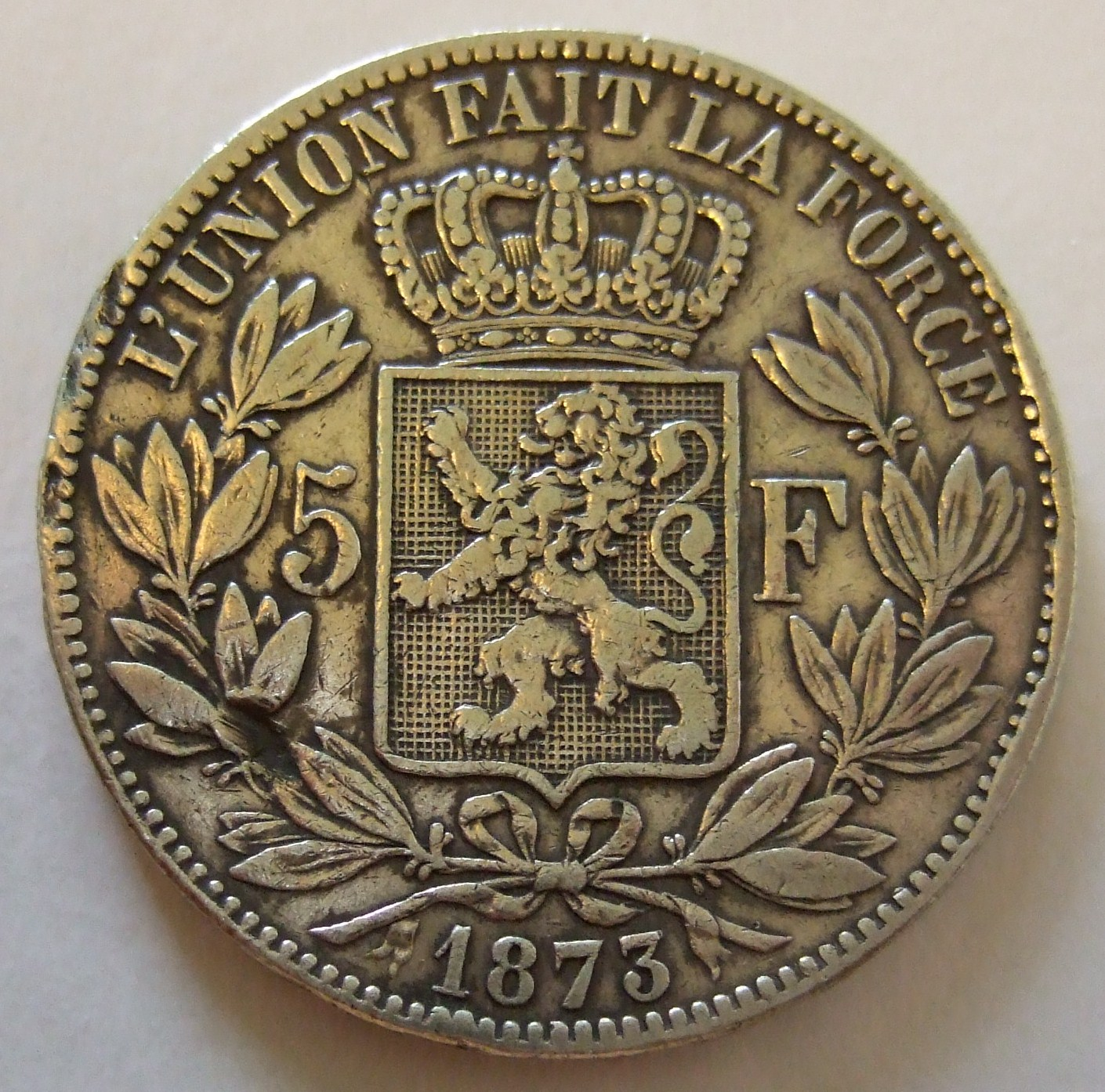
5 francs (1873)

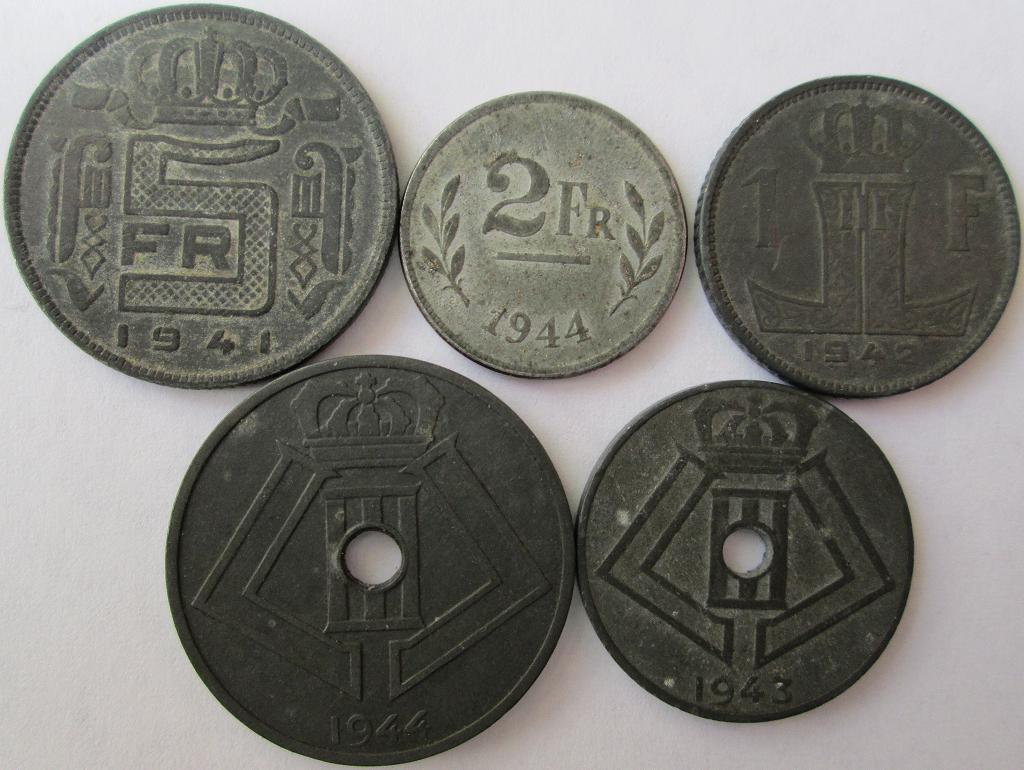
Belgian zinc coins made during World War II

Between 1832 and 1834, copper 1, 2, 5 and 10 centime, silver 1/4, 1/2, 1, 2 and 5 franc, and gold 20 and 40 franc coins were introduced. Some of the early 1 and 2 centimes were struck over Dutch 1/2 and 1 cent coins. The 40 franc was not issued after 1841, whilst silver 2 1/2 francs and gold 10 and 25 francs were issued between 1848 and 1850. Silver 20 centimes replaced the 1/4 franc in 1852. In 1860, cupro-nickel 20 centimes were introduced, followed by cupro-nickel 5 and 10 centimes in 1861. The silver 5 franc was discontinued in 1876. Between 1901 and 1908, holed, cupro-nickel 5, 10 and 25 centime coins were introduced.

In 1914, production of the 1 centime and all silver and gold coins ceased. Zinc 5, 10 and 25 centimes were introduced in the German occupied zone, followed by holed, zinc 50 centimes in 1918. Production of 2 centimes ended in 1919. In 1922 and 1923, nickel 50 centime and 1 and 2 franc coins were introduced bearing the text Good For (Bon pour in French, Goed Voor in Dutch). These featured the god Mercury. Nickel-brass replaced cupro-nickel in the 5 and 10 centimes in 1930, followed by the 25 centime in 1938. Nickel 5 and 20 francs were introduced in 1930 and 1931, respectively, followed by silver 20 francs in 1933 and 50 francs in 1939. In 1938 the 5 franc was reduced in size and redesigned along with the 1 franc to depict a lion and heraldic arms.

As a consequence of the German occupation in 1940, the silver coinage was discontinued. In 1941, zinc replaced all other metals in the 5, 10 and 25 centimes, and 1 and 5 francs. In 1944 the Allies minted 25 million 2 franc coins at the Philadelphia Mint using leftover planchets for the 1943 steel cent.

In 1948, cupro-nickel 5 francs and silver 50 and 100 francs were produced, followed by silver 20 francs in 1949 and cupro-nickel 1 franc in 1950. These coins depicted classical allegoric figures. Bronze 20 and 50 centimes featuring a miner and lantern were minted in 1952. Despite the widely varied dates these coins were issued into circulation only a few years apart as part of a broader currency reform. The silver coinage ceased production after 1955.

Cupro-nickel 25 centime coins replaced the 20 centime in 1964. The 25 centime coins were later discontinued in 1975. Nickel 10 francs depicting King Baudouin were introduced in 1969 (only struck until 1979), followed by nickel-bronze 20 francs in 1980 and nickel 50 francs in 1987, all of which — bar the 10 Franc coin — replaced the corresponding banknotes. Aluminium-bronze replaced cupro-nickel in the 5 franc in 1986, whilst nickel-plated iron replaced cupro-nickel in the 1 franc in 1988, which was also significantly reduced in size. These changes coincided with a gradual modernization of the general coinage while older issues were gradually pulled from circulation, similar to what took place during the early postwar years. The new designs were also more identifiable to vending machines and the visually impaired. 1994 saw a redesign of all denominations but the 50 centimes, with a uniform design featuring King Albert II replacing the image of Baudouin. This series ceased production after 2000.

Coins ceased to be convertible in 2004.

=== Coins under King Baudouin ===
Allegorical issue (1948-1953)
Image		Value	Diameter (mm)	Mass (g)	Composition	Edge	Obverse	Reverse	Issued from	Withdrawn
Obverse	Reverse	Value	Diameter (mm)	Mass (g)	Composition	Edge	Obverse	Reverse	Issued from	Withdrawn
		20 c	17.00	2.00	Copper: 95% Tin: 3% Zinc: 3%	Smooth	Miner and lamp	Crown and value; Lettering: België or Belgique	1953–1963	1969
		50 c	19.00	2.75	Copper: 95% Tin: 3% Zinc: 3%	Smooth	Miner and lamp	Crown and value; Lettering: België or Belgique	1952	2002
		1 F	21.00	4.00	Cupronickel	Reeded	Ceres and cornucopia; year of issue	Crown and branch; Value; Lettering: België or Belgique	1950–1988	1988
		5 F	24.00	6.00	Cupronickel	Reeded	Ceres and cornucopia; year of issue	Crown and branch; Value; Lettering: België or Belgique	1948–1981	1988
		20 F	27.00	8.00	Silver: 83.5% Copper: 16.5%	Reeded	Mercury and caduceus; year of issue	Belgian lion with a law tablet; Value; Lettering: België or Belgique	1948–1954	1974
		50 F	30.00	12.50	Silver: 83.5% Copper: 16.5%	Reeded	Mercury and caduceus; year of issue	Belgian lion with a law tablet; Value; Lettering: België or Belgique	1948–1955	1969
		100 F	33.00	18.00	Silver: 83.5% Copper: 16.5%	Reeded	Leopold I, Leopold II, Albert I and Leopold III; year of issue	Coat of arms; Value; Lettering: België or Belgique	1948–1954	1979

King Baudouin issue (1964-1989)
Image		Value	Diameter (mm)	Mass (g)	Composition	Edge	Obverse	Reverse	Issued from	Withdrawn
Obverse	Reverse	Value	Diameter (mm)	Mass (g)	Composition	Edge	Obverse	Reverse	Issued from	Withdrawn
		25 c	16.00	2.00	Cupronickel	Smooth	Monogram of Baudouin; year of issue	Value; Lettering: België or Belgique	1964–1975	1980
		1 F	18.00	2.75	Iron: 94%, Nickel: 6%	Smooth	Baudouin	Value; year of issue; Lettering: België or Belgique	1989–1993	2002
		5 F	24.00	5.50	Copper: 92% Aluminium: 6% Nickel: 2%	Smooth	Baudouin	Value; year of issue; Lettering: België or Belgique	1986–1993	2002
		10 F	27.00	8.00	Nickel	Smooth	Baudouin	Coat of arms; Value; year of issue; Lettering: België or Belgique	1969-1979	1985
		20 F	25.65	8.50	Copper: 92% Nickel: 6% Aluminium: 2%	Ornamental	Baudouin	Leaves; Value; year of issue; Lettering: België or Belgique	1980–1993	2002
		50 F	22.75	7.00	Nickel	Reeded	Baudouin	Value; year of issue; Lettering: België or Belgique	1987–1993	2002

=== Coins under King Albert II ===
King Albert II issue (1994)
Image		Value	Diameter (mm)	Mass (g)	Composition	Edge	Obverse	Reverse	Issued from	Withdrawn
Obverse	Reverse	Value	Diameter (mm)	Mass (g)	Composition	Edge	Obverse	Reverse	Issued from	Withdrawn
		1 F	18.00	2.75	Iron: 94%, Nickel: 6%	Smooth	Albert II	Lettering: België or Belgique, value and year of issue	1994–1998	2002
		5 F	24.00	5.50	Copper: 92% Aluminium: 6% Nickel: 2%	Smooth	Albert II	Lettering: België or Belgique, value and year of issue	1994–1998	2002
		20 F	25.65	8.50	Copper: 92% Nickel: 6% Aluminium: 2%	Ornamental	Albert II	Lettering: België or Belgique, value and year of issue	1994–1998	2002
		50 F	22.75	7.00	Nickel	Reeded	Albert II	Lettering: België or Belgique, value and year of issue	1994–1998	2002

== Banknotes ==
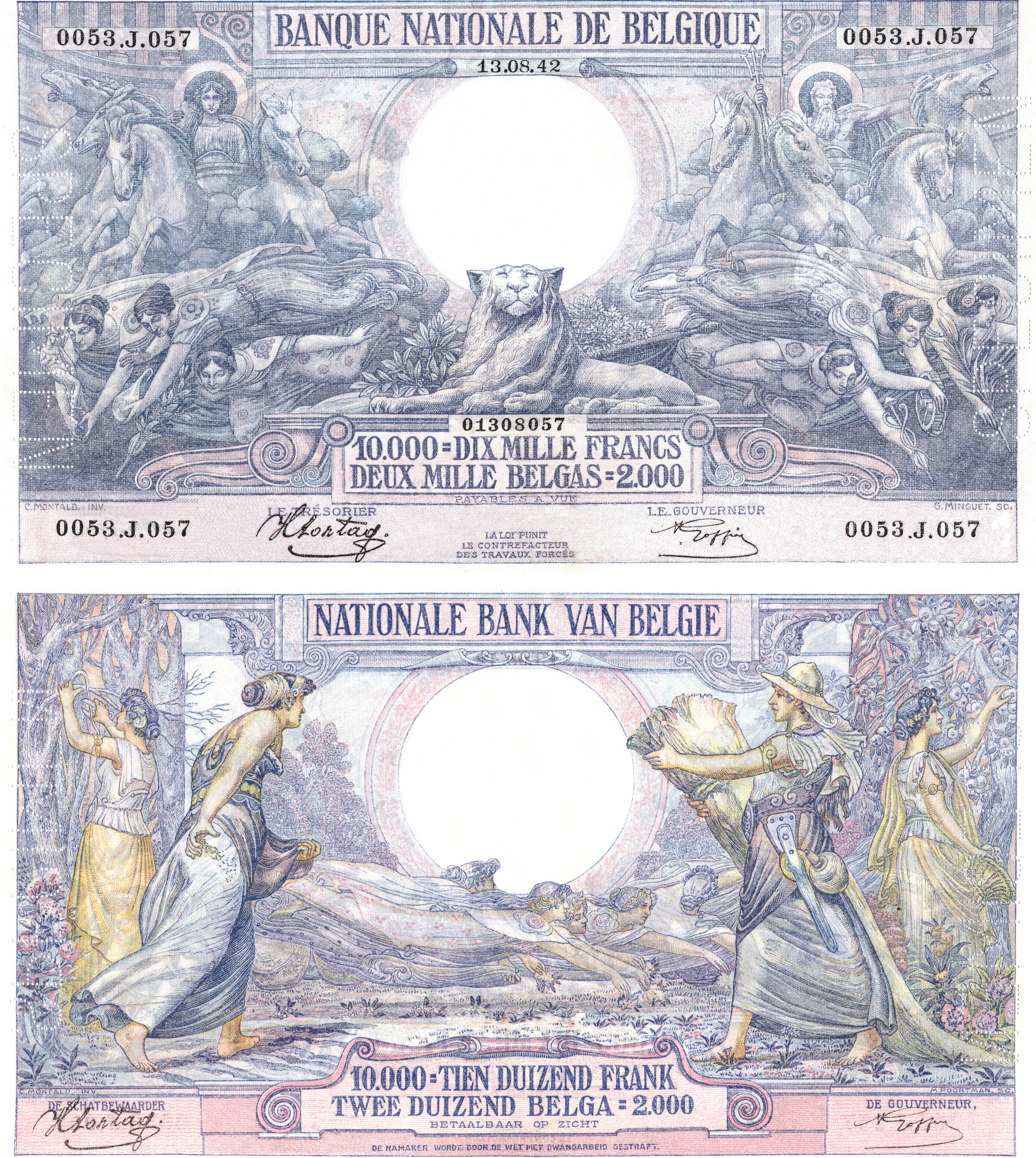
The obverse (top) and reverse of a 1929 Belgian banknote. featuring Ceres, the Belgian Lion and Neptune

Between 1835 and 1841, notes were issued by the Société de commerce de Bruxelles, the Banque Legrelle, the Société générale pour favoriser l'industrie nationale, the Banque de Belgique, the Banque de Flandre and the Banque liègeoise et Caisse d'épargnes in denominations which included 5, 10, 20, 25, 50, 100, 250, 500 and 1000 francs.

In 1851, the National Bank of Belgium began issuing paper money, in denominations of 20, 50, 100, 500 and 1000 francs. 1, 2 and 5 franc notes were introduced in 1914. The Société générale de Belgique issued paper money in the German-occupied areas between 1915 and 1918 in denominations of 1, 2, 5, 20, 100 and 1000 francs.

The treasury took over production of 5 and 20 franc notes in 1926. In 1927, notes were introduced by the National Bank with denominations given in both francs and belgas. These were 50, 100, 500, 1000 and 10,000 francs (10, 20, 100, 200 and 2000 belgas).

In 1944, following liberation, new banknotes were introduced (dated 1943 and printed in the United Kingdom) in denominations of 5, 10, 100, 500 and 1000 francs (1, 2, 20, 100 and 200 belgas). These were the last notes to bear denominations in belgas. Treasury notes for 50 francs were introduced in 1948, followed by 20 francs in 1950, whilst the National Bank continued to issue 100, 500 and 1000 francs. 5000 franc banknotes were introduced in 1971, with the 20 and 50 franc treasury notes replaced by coins in 1980 and 1987, respectively. 10,000 franc banknotes were introduced in 1992, the same year that production of the 5000 franc note ceased. 2000 franc notes were introduced in 1994, with 200-franc notes issued in 1996. While previous issues of Belgian notes were bilingual, starting with the 10000-franc notes in 1992, Belgian franc banknotes became trilingual, with the language appearing on the obverse being the main language spoken by the subject (French or Dutch) and the other two official languages (including German) on the reverse.

Unlike coins, banknotes removed from circulation in 2002 (as well as all other banknotes with denominations of at least 100 francs of earlier series issued since 1944, and certain rare banknotes issued prior to 1944) may be exchanged into euros at the National Bank of Belgium for an indefinite period of time.

=== Penultimate series ===
Banknotes of the Belgian franc (1978–1992)
Image	Value	Euro equivalent	Dimensions (mm)	Main colour	Description		Issue	Withdrawn
Image	Value	Euro equivalent	Dimensions (mm)	Main colour	Obverse	Reverse	Issue	Withdrawn
	100 BEF	€2.48	142 x 76	Red	Hendrik Beyaert; National bank buildings	Geometric plumb bob	1978	1996
	500 BEF	€12.39	148 x 76	Blue	Constantin Meunier; colliery towers	Five energy sources and turbine	1979	1998
	1000 BEF	€24.79	154 x 76	Brown	André Ernest Modeste Grétry; bass violin	Tuning forks and inner ear	1980	1997
	5000 BEF	€123.95	160 x 76	Green	Guido Gezelle; stained glass window	Dragonfly and leaf	1982	1994
	10,000 BEF	€247.89	168 x 76	Grey	Baudouin and Fabiola; hemicycle	Royal Greenhouses of Laeken	1992	1997

=== Last series ===
Banknotes of the Belgian franc (1994–1998)
Image		Value	Euro equivalent	Dimensions (mm)	Main colour	Description		Issue
Obverse	Reverse	Value	Euro equivalent	Dimensions (mm)	Main colour	Obverse	Reverse	Issue
		100 BEF	€2.48	139 x 76	Red	James Ensor, theater masks	Les Bains à Ostende by Ensor	1995
		200 BEF	€4.96	144 x 76	Yellow	Adolphe Sax, saxophone	Musicians, buildings in Dinant	1996
		500 BEF	€12.39	149 x 76	Blue	René Magritte, trees	Le fils de l'ombre by Magritte	1998
		1000 BEF	€24.79	154 x 76	Brown	Constant Permeke, sailing boat	Sleeping farmer by Permeke	1997
		2000 BEF	€49.58	159 x 76	Purple	Victor Horta, decorations	Art Nouveau design, flowers, elements from the Horta Museum	1994
		10,000 BEF	€247.89	169 x 76	Grey	Albert II and Paola; hemicycle	Royal Greenhouses of Laeken	1997

== See also ==
- Adoption of the euro in Belgium
- Belgian euro coins
- Belgium–Luxembourg Economic Union
- Economy of Belgium
- Euro gold and silver commemorative coins (Belgium)
- Joseph-Pierre Braemt
- Marcel Rau
- Belgian Congo franc
- Ruanda-Urundi franc

Preceded by Dutch guilder 1815–1832; Dutch guilder 1815–1839; Prussian Thaler 1842–1848	Belgian currency 1832–1999; 1839–1842 (Luxembourg); 1848–1854 (Luxembourg)	Succeeded by Euro; Prussian Thaler 1842–1848; Luxembourgish franc 1854–1999
