= European Union design =

Unitary industrial design right that covers the European Union

A European Union design is a unitary industrial design right that covers the European Union. It has both unregistered and registered forms. The name European Union design (EU design) was adopted 1 May 2025.

Previously, this industrial design right covering the European Union was named Community design. The unregistered Community design (UCD) came into effect on 6 March 2002 and the registered Community design (RCD) was available from 1 April 2003.

== Legal basis ==
Council Regulation (EC) No 6/2002, as implemented by Commission Regulation (EC) No 2245/2002, created both unregistered and registered European Community designs. The Community design is a unitary right that has equal effect across the European Union. The unregistered form of the right has existed since 6 March 2002 while the registered form came into effect on 1 April 2003.

By Regulation (EU) 2024/2822, the name was changed to European Union design; this change took effect on 1 May 2025.

== Definitions ==
A design is defined as "the appearance of the whole or a part of a product resulting from the features of, in particular, the lines, contours, colours, shape, texture and/or materials of the product itself and/or its ornamentation".

Designs may be protected if:

- they are novel, that is if no identical design has been made available to the public;
- they have individual character, that is the "informed user" would find it different from other designs which are available to the public. Where a design forms part of a more complex product, the novelty and individual character of the design are judged on the part of the design which is visible during normal use.

== Scope of protection ==
The scope of protection conferred by a Community design includes any design which does not produce a different overall impression on an informed user, taking the degree of freedom of the designer into consideration. A Community design further confers on its holder the exclusive right to use it and to prevent any third party not having his consent from using it. For an unregistered Community design, however, the contested use must have resulted from copying the protected design.

== Term ==
An unregistered Community design lasts for a period of 3 years from the date on which the design was first made available to the public within the Community. A design shall be deemed to have been made available to the public within the Community if "it has been published, exhibited, used in trade or otherwise disclosed in such a way that, in the normal course of business, these events could reasonably have become known to the circles specialised in the sector concerned, operating within the Community. The design shall not, however, be deemed to have been made available to the public "for the sole reason that it has been disclosed to a third person under explicit or implicit conditions of confidentiality."

A registered Community design (RCD) lasts for up to 25 years from the date on which an application for registration was filed, subject to the payment of maintenance fees. The registration process is administered by the EUIPO in Alicante.

== Effects ==
The unregistered Community design provides useful, short-term protection for items of short market duration. The registered Community design provides substantial cost savings compared to obtaining national registrations in individual European countries. The Community design also permits those having business in a number of European countries to protect their designs in all of those countries more simply.
