= Ude =

Ude or UDE may refer to:

== People ==
- Louis Eustache Ude (1769-1846), French chef and author in London
- Johannes Ude (1874–1965), Austrian priest, pacifist and philosopher
- Lojze Ude (1896–1982), Slovenian lawyer, journalist and historian
- Karl Ude (1906–1997), German journalist
- Otto Ude (1911–1987), German Wehrmacht Lieutenant
- Christian Ude (born 1947), former mayor of Munich (SPD), Germany
- Hermann Ude (born 1961), German economist and manager
- Iké Udé (born 1964), Nigerian-American photographer
- Filip Ude (born 1986), Croatian gymnast

== Places ==
- Ulan-Ude, the capital city of Buryatia, Russia

== Other uses ==
- UDE, a Unix Desktop Environment
- Upper Deck Entertainment, entertainment and game trading card company
- Volkel Air Base's IATA code, a military airbase near Uden, Netherlands
- Udege language's ISO 639-3 code, a Siberian language
- Universal differential equation, a differential algebraic equation that can approximate any continuous function
- Universal differential equation is also the name given to some neural differential equations

== See also ==
- UdeS
- Uhde (disambiguation)
- Uda (disambiguation)
- Udi (disambiguation)
