= Alliance pour les chiffres de la presse et des médias =

OJD
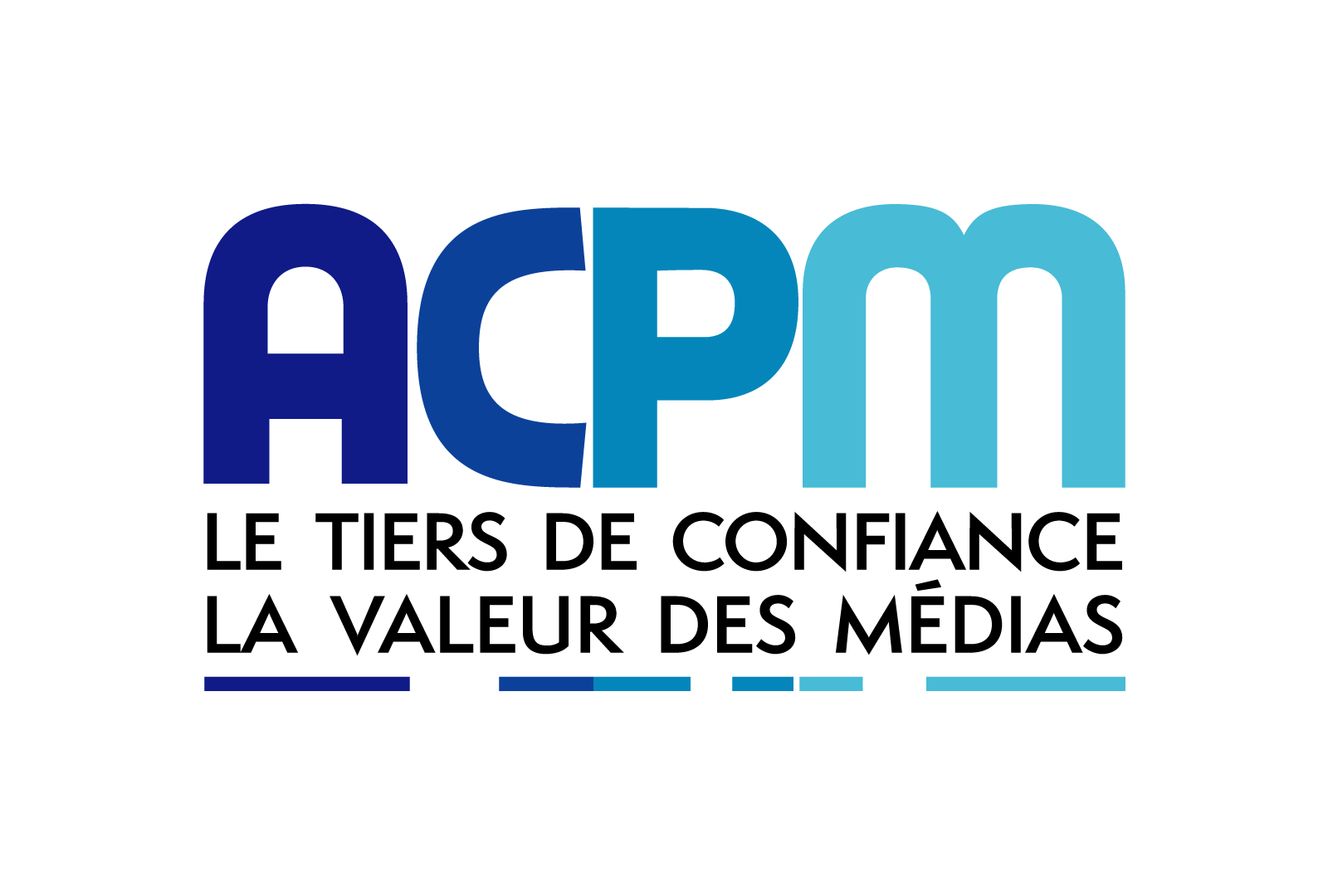
- Formerly: Diffusion Contrôle
- Type: Nonprofit organisation
- Industry: Audience measurement
- Founded: 1922
- Headquarters: Paris, France
- Area served: France
- Key people: Stéphane Bodier Jean-Paul Dietsch
- Website: ojd.com

OJD (French: Office de justification de la diffusion French pronunciation: [aljɑ̃s puʁ le ʃifʁ də la pʁɛs e de medja], "Circulation Audit Office"), formerly Diffusion Contrôle, is a French nonprofit organisation (in French: Association loi de 1901) that certifies the circulation of newspapers and periodicals in France, to provide advertisers with audience measurement figures.

== History ==
Bien avant la deuxième guerre mondiale, en 1922, les industriels annonceurs avaient pensé qu'un système métrique était indispensable pour mesurer la véracité des chiffres de tirage annoncés par la Presse, et ont encouragé l'initiative que prenait avec courage Martial Buisson. L'OJT (Office de justification des tirages) est devenu en 1948 l'OJD [Office de justification de la diffusion], car seule la diffusion est la base de toute négociation honnête. Secrétaire général, Martial Buisson, aidé dans cette lourde tâche par Jean Bonherbe, accède à la Présidence jusqu'en 1971.

Well before the Second World War, in 1922, the industrialists said they had thought of a system of measurement that would be indispensable to verify the work and output of the Press, and pushed the initiative hard at Martial Buisson, In 1948 the Office de justification des tirages ("Press Compliance Office") became the OJT, (French: Office de justification de la diffusion, "Circulation Audit Office"), concerned only with circulation and honest dealing. The secretary-general, Martial Buisson, with Jean Bonherbe at his side, acted as President until 1971.

— Michel Cazé, honorary president of UDA and founder member of the OJD, 1977

In 1963, Buisson founded, at Stockholm, the Fédération Internationale, a federation of the OJD and IFABC, and became its honorary president.

In 2005, Diffusion Contrôle was renamed OJD, its trading name since 1946.
