= Uhde =

Uhde is a surname. It may refer to:

- Andreas Uhde (born 1978), a German business journalist and manager
- August Uhde (1807–1861), a German astronomer, mathematician and educator
- Bernd Uhde (born 1950), a German photographer
- Bernhard Uhde (born 1948), a German Catholic theologian
- Carl Uhde (1792–1856), a German merchant and collector
- Constantin Uhde (1836–1905), a German architect
- Enno-Ilka Uhde (born 1948), a German painter and performance designer
- Friedrich Uhde (engineer) (1880–1966), a German engineer and entrepreneur
- Fritz von Uhde (1848–1911), a German painter
- Heinrich Uhde (born 1937), a German lawyer, dog handler and writer
- Hermann Uhde (1914–1965), a German bass-baritone
- Hermann Uhde-Bernays (1873–1965), a German Germanist and art historian
- Johann Otto Uhde (1725–1766), a German composer and violinist
- Jürgen Uhde (1913–1991), a German musicologist, pianist and educator
- Karl Uhde (1813–1885), a German surgeon
- Milan Uhde (born 1936), a Czech playwright and politician
- Reinhard Uhde (1929–2014), a German journalist and politician
- Wilhelm Uhde (1874–1947), a German art collector
- Wilhelm Uhde (writer) (1868–1917), a German writer, poet and composer

It may also refer to:

- ThyssenKrupp Uhde, an engineering division of the German ThyssenKrupp

== See also ==
- Ude (disambiguation)
