= Steinort =

Two locations now in Poland were previously known by the German name of Steinort

- Gleźnowo
- Sztynort
