= Veruschka =

German model, actress and performance artist

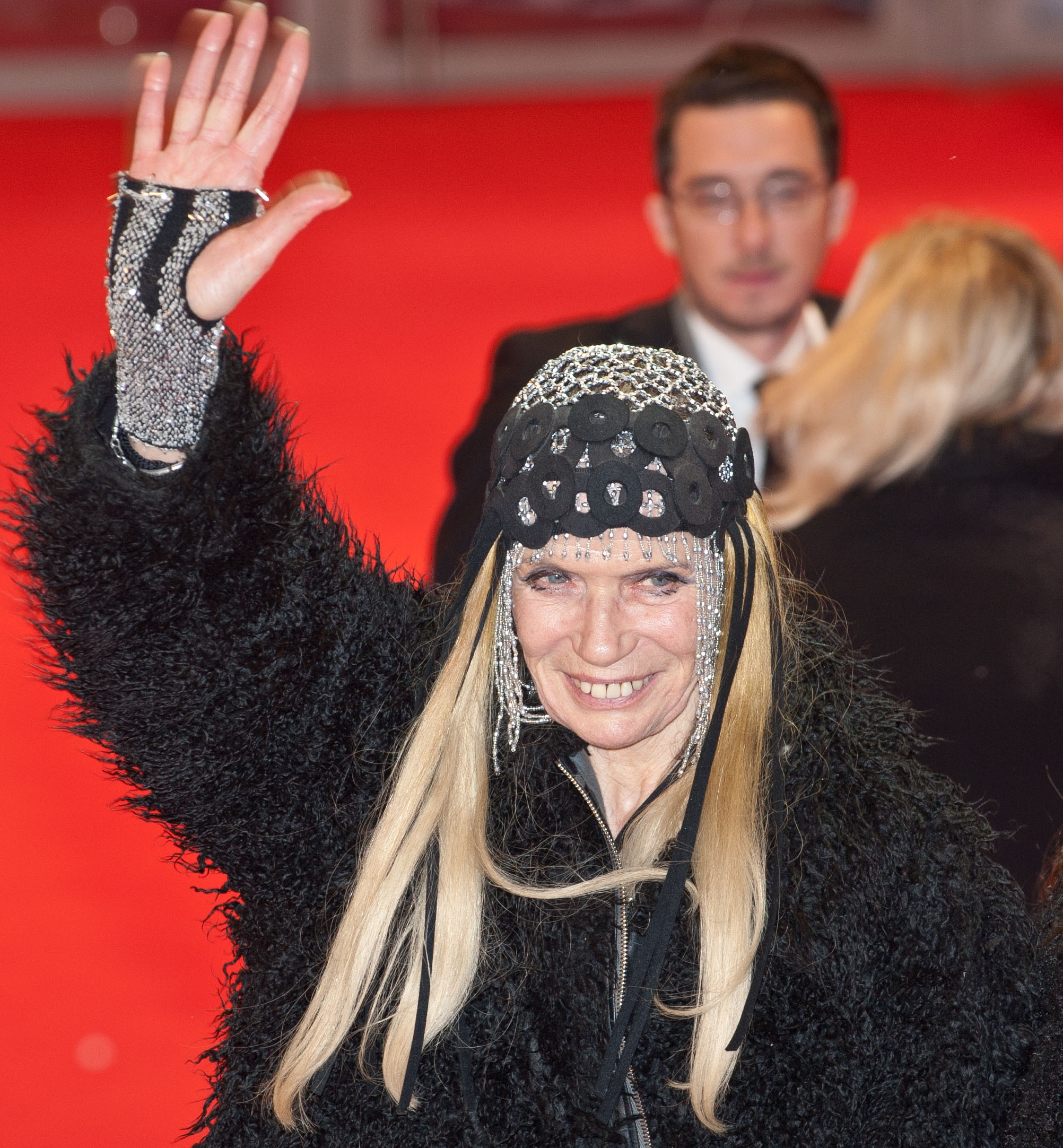
- Von Lehndorff in 2013
- Born: Vera Gottliebe Anna Gräfin von Lehndorff-Steinort; 14 May 1939 (age 87); Königsberg, East Prussia, Germany
- Modeling information
- Height: 183 cm (6 ft 0 in)
- Hair color: Dark blonde
- Eye color: Blue / grey
- Agency: The Lions (New York)

Vera Lehndorff (German: Vera Anna Gottliebe Gräfin von Lehndorff; born 14 May 1939), known professionally as Veruschka, is a German aristocrat, model, actress and artist. She is considered the "first German supermodel".

== Early life and ancestry ==
Born into an old noble House of Lehndorff, Vera Gottliebe Anna Gräfin von Lehndorff-Steinort was born in Königsberg, East Prussia, as the second of four daughters of Count Henrich von Lehndorff-Steinort and his wife, Countess Gottliebe Marianne Alexandrine Nancy von Kalnein (1913–1993). Her father was a German aristocrat and army reserve officer who became a key member of the German Resistance, after witnessing Jewish children being beaten and killed.

She is one of four sisters: Marie Eleanore Nona (b. 1937, d. 2018, married Jan van Haeften and later Wolf-Siegfried Wagner (b. 1943), son of Wieland Wagner and great-grandson of composer Richard Wagner); Gabriele (b. 1942, married Armin, Edler Herr und Freiherr von Plotho); and Katharina (b. 1944, married Henrik Kappelhoff-Wulff).

She grew up at Steinort, an estate in East Prussia, which had belonged to her family for centuries. When Veruschka was five years old, her father was executed for being involved in the attempt to assassinate Adolf Hitler in the 20 July Plot. After his death, the remaining family members were detained in labor camps until the end of World War II. Her family was left homeless by the end of the war and the annexation of East Prussia by the Soviet Union. As a young girl, she attended 13 schools.

== Rise to fame ==
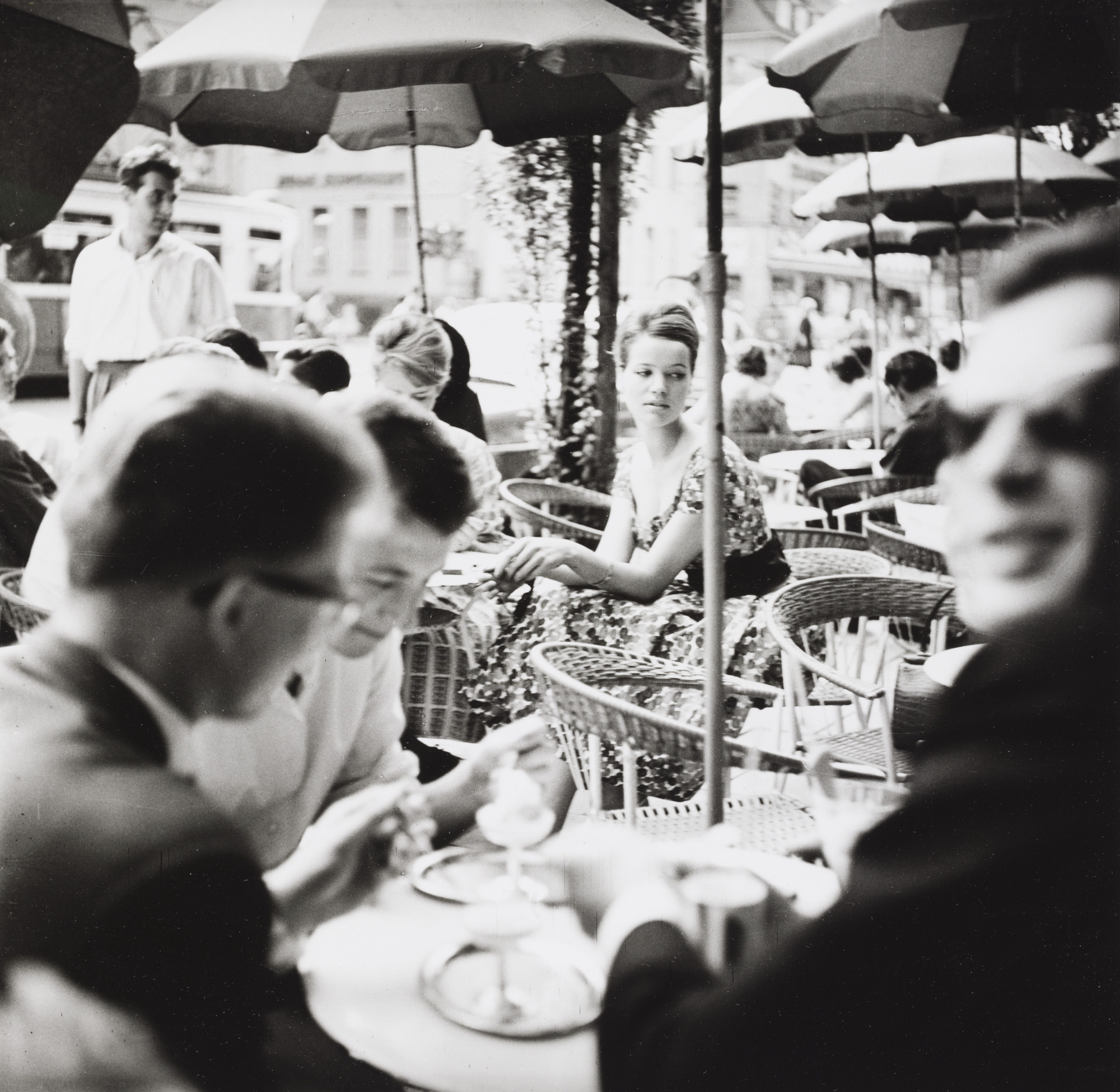
Veruschka von Lehndorff in Café Cadore, Munich, 1960

She studied art in Hamburg and then moved to Florence, where she was discovered at age 20 by the photographer Ugo Mulas and became a full-time model. In Paris, she met Eileen Ford, head of the prestigious Ford Modeling Agency. In 1961 she moved to New York City, but soon returned to Munich. For some time she was with the Stewart Modeling Agency at 405 Park Avenue in New York, where she reigned as the girl with the most covers on the wall inside the agency's entrance. She had also garnered attention when she made a brief five-minute appearance in the 1966 cult film Blow Up by Michelangelo Antonioni.

Veruschka appeared on the cover of Life magazine's August 1967 issue; and various times on all four major Vogue magazines' (American, Italian, French and British) covers throughout the 1960s. She once worked with Salvador Dalí and photographer Peter Beard, who took her to Kenya. At her peak, she earned as much as $10,000 a day. In 1975, however, she departed from the fashion industry due to disagreements with Grace Mirabella, the newly appointed editor-in-chief of Vogue. In a 1999 interview, Veruschka said of their disagreements, "She wanted me to be bourgeois, and I didn't want to be that. I didn't model for a long time after that."

In 1969, she attended the Woodstock festival.

Veruschka inspired the most prestigious photographers of her time, like Franco Rubartelli, Richard Avedon, Bert Stern, David Bailey, Steven Meisel, Francesco Scavullo, and Peter Beard, who took her to Kenya and for big designers like Tom Ford, Michael Kors, Dolce & Gabbana and Ailanto.

Veruschka inspired the name of a Guardian comic strip of the 1970s by John Kent, Varoomshka, but the character was based on Kent's wife.

Veruschka was a pioneer of body painting. In 1966 she appeared in a photoshoot wearing nothing but body paint. After she retired from modelling in 1975 she collaborated with the sculptor and painter Holger Trülzsch, using body painting to create a series of avant-garde nude self-portrait photographs.

She worked for the most important fashion houses, like YSL. Since 1990 she worked for Helmut Lang and Paco Rabanne.

She appeared as one of 28 women under the banner We've had abortions! (Wir haben abgetrieben!) on the cover page of the West German magazine Stern on 6 June 1971. In that issue, 374 women publicly stated that they had had pregnancies terminated, which at that time was illegal.

Occasionally Veruschka still appears on catwalks. She was a guest model in the Melbourne Fashion Festival in 2000 in Australia. In October 2010, at the age of 71, she modeled for Giles Deacon's showing for the fall run of London Fashion Week. She appeared in the Resort 2018 lookbook for Acne Studios in 2017.

Veruschka provided vocals on several tracks on the 2010 album Mimikry by ANBB, a collaboration between Blixa Bargeld and Alva Noto.

== Filmography ==
- Blowup (1966) – Herself
- Veruschka: Poetry of a Woman (1971)
- Salomé (1972) – Myrrhina
- Evil Thoughts (1976) – Mario Manani's Lover
- Flesh Color (1978) – Anna
- Milo Milo (1979) – Barbara
- Bizarre Styles (1981) – Prophet
- Dorian Gray in the Mirror of the Yellow Press (1984) – Dorian Gray
- Vom Zusehen beim Sterben (1985) – Herself
- The Bride (1985) – Countess
- L'Orchestre rouge (1989) – Anna Maximovitch
- Veruschka – Die Inszenierung (m)eines Körpers (2005) – Herself
- Casino Royale (2006) – Gräfin von Wallenstein
