= Heinrich Graf von Lehndorff-Steinort =

German Army officer and member of the 20 July Plot (1909–1944)

Heinrich Ahasverus Graf von Lehndorff-Steinort
- Born: 22 June 1909; Hanover, German Empire
- Died: 4 September 1944 (aged 35); Plötzensee Prison, Berlin, Nazi Germany
- Cause of death: Execution by hanging
- Occupation: Army Officer
- Spouse: Gottliebe Gräfin von Kalnein

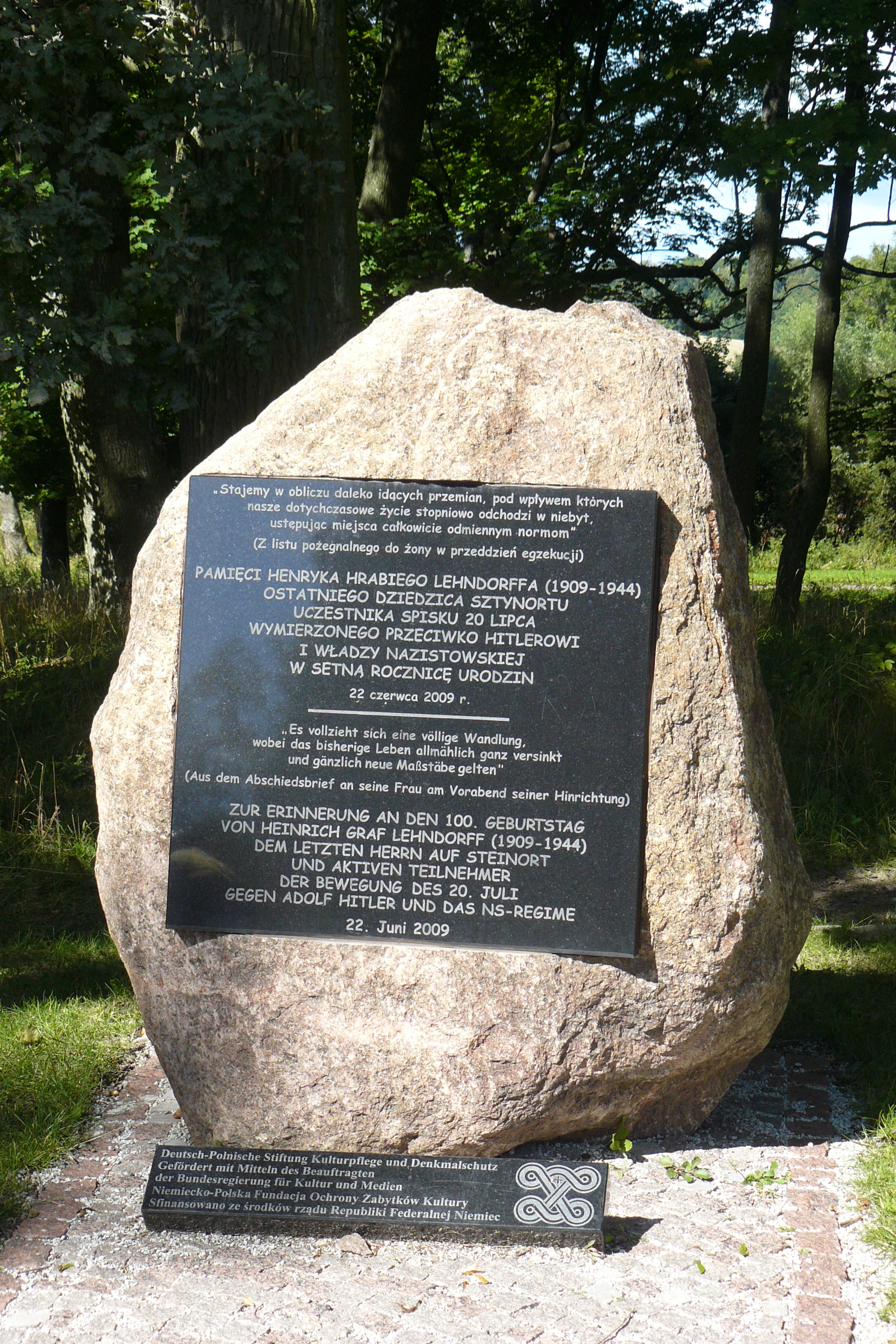
Memorial stone on the occasion of the 100th birthday of Heinrich Graf von Lehndorff, the last man on Steinort and an active participant in the Hitler assassination attempt on 20 July 1944.

Heinrich Ahasverus Graf von Lehndorff-Steinort (22 June 1909 – 4 September 1944) was an East Prussian junker and aristocrat who became a member of the 20 July plot to assassinate Adolf Hitler.

== Early life and ancestry ==
Born into an old noble House of Lehndorff, Heinrich was born in Hanover, Germany as the eldest child of Count Manfred von Lehndorff-Steinort (1883–1962) and his wife, Countess Harriet Sabine Karoline von Einsiedel (1886–1964).

== Biography ==
He studied economics and business administration in Frankfurt am Main. In 1936 he took over the management of the family estate Steinort in East Prussia. After the Second World War broke out, he was first deployed in Poland, and later, as a reserve lieutenant, posted to General Fedor von Bock's staff, who later became supreme commander of Army Group Centre (Heeresgruppe Mitte). During Operation Barbarossa (the German attack on the Soviet Union), Lehndorff became an eyewitness to a massacre of the Jewish population near Barysaŭ in Belarus by Einsatzgruppen. Thereupon, Henning von Tresckow won him over to the cause of military resistance (Widerstand) against Hitler.

As a first lieutenant in the reserves, Lehndorff was deployed as liaison officer to Defence District I (East Prussia) in Königsberg (today Kaliningrad, Russia). One day after the failed attempt on Hitler's life at the Wolf's Lair on 20 July 1944, Lehndorff was arrested. Along with Kurt Hahn, Gerhard Knaak, Hans Otto Erdmann and Max Ulrich von Drechsel he was sentenced to death by the Volksgerichtshof under Günther Nebelung on 4 September 1944. He was hanged the same day at Plötzensee Prison in Berlin. His wife Gottliebe née Gräfin von Kalnein (1913–1993) and their four daughters (Marie Eleanore [who married Wieland Wagner's son, Wolf Siegfried], Vera, Gabriele, and Katharina) spent the remainder of the war confined to concentration camps.

His daughter Vera von Lehndorff (1939– ) became a well-known photographic model and actress under the professional name Veruschka.

== See also ==
- List of members of the 20 July plot
