= Hans Otto Erdmann =

- Born: 18 December 1896 Insterburg, East Prussia, Germany (now Chernyakhovsk, Russia)
- Died: 4 September 1944 (aged 47) Plötzensee Prison, Berlin, Germany
- Cause of death: Execution by hanging
- Allegiance: Germany
- Branch: Imperial German Army; German Army
- Conflicts: World War II; German resistance to Nazism

Hans Otto Erdmann (18 December 1896 – 4 September 1944) was a German Army officer and member of the German resistance to Nazism.

== Early life ==
Erdmann was born in Insterburg, East Prussia (now Chernyakhovsk, Russia). In World War I, Erdmann served as an officer in the Imperial German Army and later worked as a postal clerk. In 1935 he joined the Wehrmacht and was deployed at the Generalkommando in Königsberg in 1944 in the rank of lieutenant colonel.

== Career ==
In June 1944 Claus von Stauffenberg informed Erdmann about the planned assassination of Hitler. In the Operation Valkyrie/s plans, Erdmann was supposed to organize the occupation of public buildings and broadcasting stations in East Prussia.

After the July 20 plot had failed, Erdmann was arrested on 17 August 1944 and sentenced to death by the Volksgerichtshof under Günther Nebelung on 4 September 1944, along with Kurt Hahn, Gerhard Knaak, Heinrich Graf von Lehndorff-Steinort and Max Ulrich von Drechsel. All were hanged on the same day at Plötzensee Prison in Berlin.
