= UDI =

UDI may refer to:

== Organisations ==
- Independent Democratic Union (Unión Demócrata Independiente), a political party in Chile
- Union of Democrats and Independents, a political party in France
- United Defense Industries, a supplier of land warfare systems, now part of BAE Systems Land and Armaments
- United Diving Instructors, a diver training organization

== Technology ==
- Uniform Driver Interface, a project to develop portable device drivers
- Unified Display Interface, digital video interface specification based on DVI
- Universal Disk Image, a disk image format
- Unique Device Identification, a system that is intended to assign a unique identifier - the Unique Device Identifier - to medical devices within the United States, Europe, China, South Korea, Saudi Arabia and Taiwan
- Unrestricted Digital Information, a type of Circuit Switched Data Bearer Capability service commonly used with GSM cellular networks

== Other uses ==
- Unilateral declaration of independence, an assertion of the independence of an aspiring state or states
  - Rhodesia's Unilateral Declaration of Independence, in November 1965
- Mexican unidad de inversión, Mexican currency funds unit
- Universal design for instruction, an educational framework

== See also ==
- Udi (disambiguation)
