= Ernst Wichert =

German writer (1831–1902)

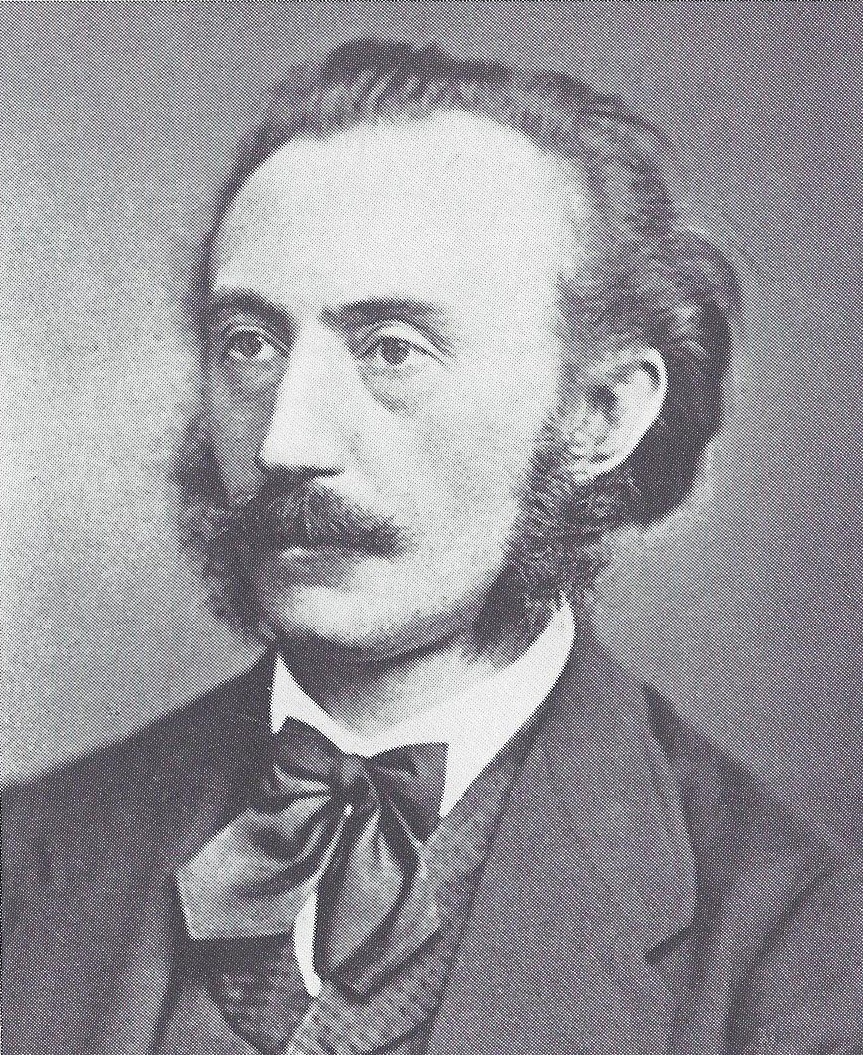
Ernst Wichert

Ernst Alexander August George Wichert (11 March 1831 – 21 January 1902) was a German lawyer, judge, and author.

== Biography ==
Wichert was born in Insterburg, Prussia, (today Chernyakhovsk, Russia) and attended schools in Pillau and Königsberg.

He studied law at the University of Königsberg and worked as an assessor in Memel. In 1860 Wichert became a district judge in Prökuls (today Priekulė, Lithuania). In 1863 he returned to Königsberg as a judge of the local court and became an Oberlandesgerichtsrat in 1877 (sometimes also 1879 is reported). In 1888 Wichert moved to Berlin, where he became Kammergerichtsrat at the Berlin Kammergericht. He retired in 1896 and died in 1902.

While performing his duties as a judge, in his spare time Wichert wrote and published 34 stage plays, 28 novels and 15 multi-volume novellas.

== Works ==
=== Stage plays ===
- Unser General York, 1858
- Der Withing von Samland, 1860
- Licht und Schatten, 1861
- Der Narr des Glücks, 1871
- Ein Schritt vom Wege, 1873
- Die Realisten, 1874
- Biegen oder Brechen, 1874
- An der Majorsecke, 1875
- Die Frau für die Welt, 1876
- Der Freund des Fürsten, 1879
- Peter Munk, 1882
- Im Dienst der Pflicht, 1896
- Als Verlobte empfehlen sich

=== Novels and novellas ===
- Aus anständiger Familie, 1866
- Ein hässlicher Mensch, 1868
- Die Arbeiter, 1873
- Heinrich von Plauen, 1881
- Litauische Geschichten, 1881
- Aus dem Leben, Novella, 1882
- Unter einer Decke, Novella, 1883
- Der Große Kurfürst in Preußen, 1887
- Die Taube auf dem Dache, 1892
- Frauengegestalten, 1894
- Die Schwestern, 1896
- Der Bürgermeister von Thorn
- Kleine Passionen

=== Autobiography ===
- Richter und Dichter. Ein Lebensausweis, 1899

=== Screen adaption ===
- Elzes Leben (Elzė iš Giljos), a film version of Der Schaktarp, (Lit-D, 1999), directed by Algimantas Puipa, appearing Endrikis Andrius Paulavičius, Elzė Eglė Jaselskytė, Aušra Venckunaitė

== Literature ==
- Margot Braun: Ernst Wicherts Roman "Der Große Kurfürst in Preußen". Ein Beitrag zur Geschichte des historischen Romans im 19. Jahrhundert. Würzburg-Aumühle
