= Therese Malten =

German opera soprano (1855–1930)

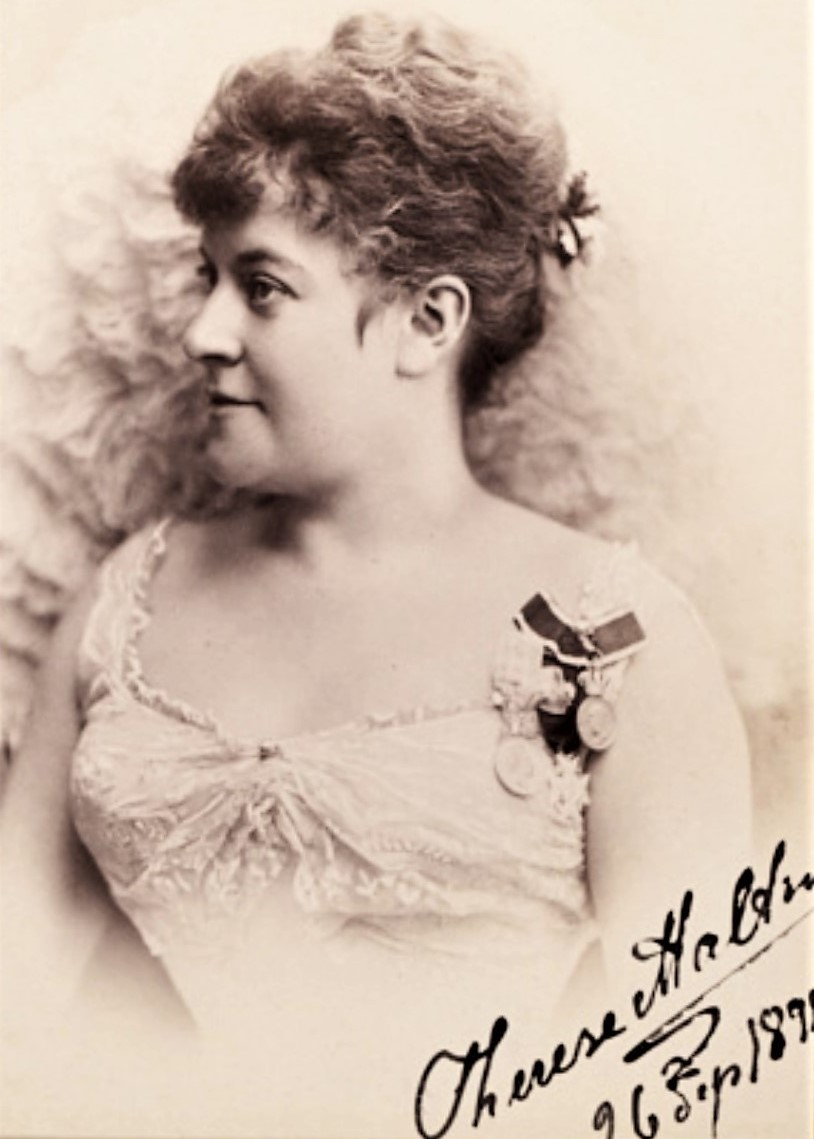
Therese Malten in 1892

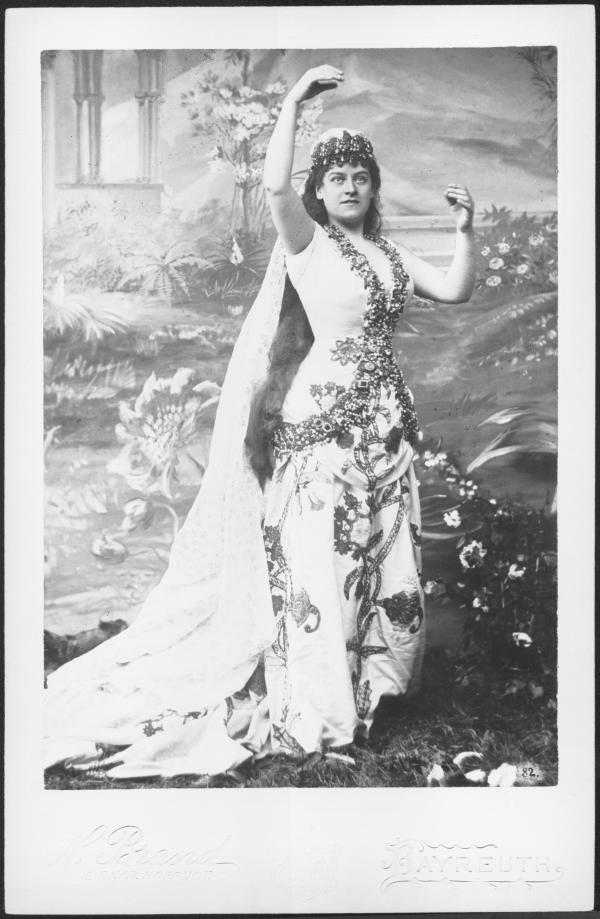
Malten in 1883 as Kundry

Therese Malten was the stage name of Therese Müller (21 June 1855 – 2 January 1930), a well-known German dramatic soprano.

She was born at Insterburg, Province of Prussia, studied with Gustav Engel in Berlin, and made her début in 1873 in Dresden as Pamina in The Magic Flute. In 1882, Richard Wagner selected her as the original Kundry in Parsifal. From that time on until her retirement in 1903, she remained a member of the Dresden Opera, with frequent leaves of absence for appearances in the principal European opera houses.

Her repertory included many of the great mainstream operas, but she was pre-eminent as an interpreter of Wagner's heroines.
