= Uda =

Uda or UDA may refer to:

== Organizations ==
- UD Almería, a Spanish football club
- Unión Deportivo Ascensión, a Peruvian football club
- Ulster Defence Association, a loyalist paramilitary organisation in Northern Ireland
- Union des artistes, a Quebec actors' union
- Union for Democratic Action, an American political organization
- United Democratic Alliance (disambiguation), various political parties
- Urban Development Authority, a department of the Ministry of Urban Development (Sri Lanka)
- University of Atacama (Spanish: Universidad de Atacama)
- UDA Holdings, a Malaysian holding company

== Places ==
- Uda, Argeș, a commune in Argeș County, Romania
- Uda, Nara, a city in Japan
  - Uda District, Nara, Japan
- Uda District, Iwaki, a district of Iwaki Province, Japan during the Nara period
- Wuda District, Wuhai, Inner Mongolia, China (sometimes called Uda District)
- Uda, a village in Tătăruși Commune, Iași County, Romania

=== Rivers ===
- Uda (Khabarovsk Krai), a river in the Russian Far East, flowing into the Sea of Okhotsk
- Uda (Selenga), a tributary of the Selenga in Buryatia, Russia
- Uda River (Uda), a river in Japan; see Shibuya River
- Uda, the name for the upper course of the river Chuna in Irkutsk Oblast, Russia
- Uda, another name for the river Udy, a tributary of the Donets in Ukraine

== People ==
- Emperor Uda (866–931), Emperor of Japan
- Uda (surname), a surname

== Other uses ==
- Undocumented alien
- Uda-class oiler, a class of oilers built for the Soviet Navy
- Uda language, a language of Nigeria
- Uda sheep, a breed of sheep
- uda-, a proposed SI unit prefix for 10^{36}.
