= Johann Friedrich Goldbeck =

German geographer (1748–1812)

Johann Friedrich Goldbeck (22 September 1748 – 9 April 1812) was a German geographer and Protestant theologian.

Goldbeck was born in Insterburg, East Prussia. He first visited the Latin school in his home town Insterburg and thereafter, from 1761 to 1764, the Collegium Fridericianum (Friedrichskollegium) in Königsberg. Since 1764 he studied theology at the University of Königsberg. In 1769 he was appointed as a private tutor by a Prussian nobleman, whom he accompanied in 1771 on a journey to the town of Magdeburg. In 1772 he became a teacher at Kloster Berge school located in the vicinity of Magdeburg. One year later he became an army chaplain in the infantry regiment v. Rohr (No. 15) in Graudenz. In 1783 he was nominated as a senior minister of the parish of Schaaken, Landkreis Königsberg, East Prussia.

After he had published some articles on theological and pedagogical topics, he edited since 1781 his Litterarischen Nachrichten von Preußen (Literary news from Prussia) which consist of two parts and which are in use still today. His most important work is the Vollständige Topographie des Königreichs Preußen (Complete topography of the Kingdom of Prussia) (1785 und 1789), which consist of two parts. Part I covers all departments, towns and Amtsbezirke of East Prussia, Part II covers all departments, towns and Amtsbezirke of West Prussia.

Goldbeck was an honorary member of Königliche Deutsche Gesellschaft zu Königsberg (Royal German society in Königsberg). He died on 9 April 1812 in Schaaken.

== Works (selection) ==
- Über die Erziehung der Waisenkinder: allen wohlthätigen Fürsten und grosmüthigen Menschenfreunden gewidmet, 1781.
- Nachrichten von der königlichen Universität zu Königsberg in Preußen und den daselbst befindlichen Lehr-, Schul- und Erziehungsanstalten. Graudenz 1782 (Online, Google).
- Litterarische Nachrichten von Preußen
  - Part I, Leipzig and Dessau 1781 (Online, MDZ).
  - Part II, Leipzig and Dessau 1783 (Online, Google)
- Volständige Topographie des Königreichs Preußen.
  - Part I: Topographie von Ost-Preußen, Marienwerder 1785 (Online, Google); Volständige Topographie vom Ost-Preußischen Cammer-Departement (Online, Google); Volständige Topographie vom Littthauischen Cammer-Departement (Online, Google)
  - Part II: Topographie von West-Preußen, Marienwerder 1789 (Online, Google); Volständige Topographie vom West-Preußischen Cammer-Departement (Online, Google)

== Literature ==
- (in German) Altpreußische Biographie (Christian Krollmann, ed.), Vol. 1, Elwert, Marburg/Lahn 1974.
