= Chernyakhovsk =

Town in Kaliningrad Oblast, Russia

Chernyakhovsk Черняховск
- Town
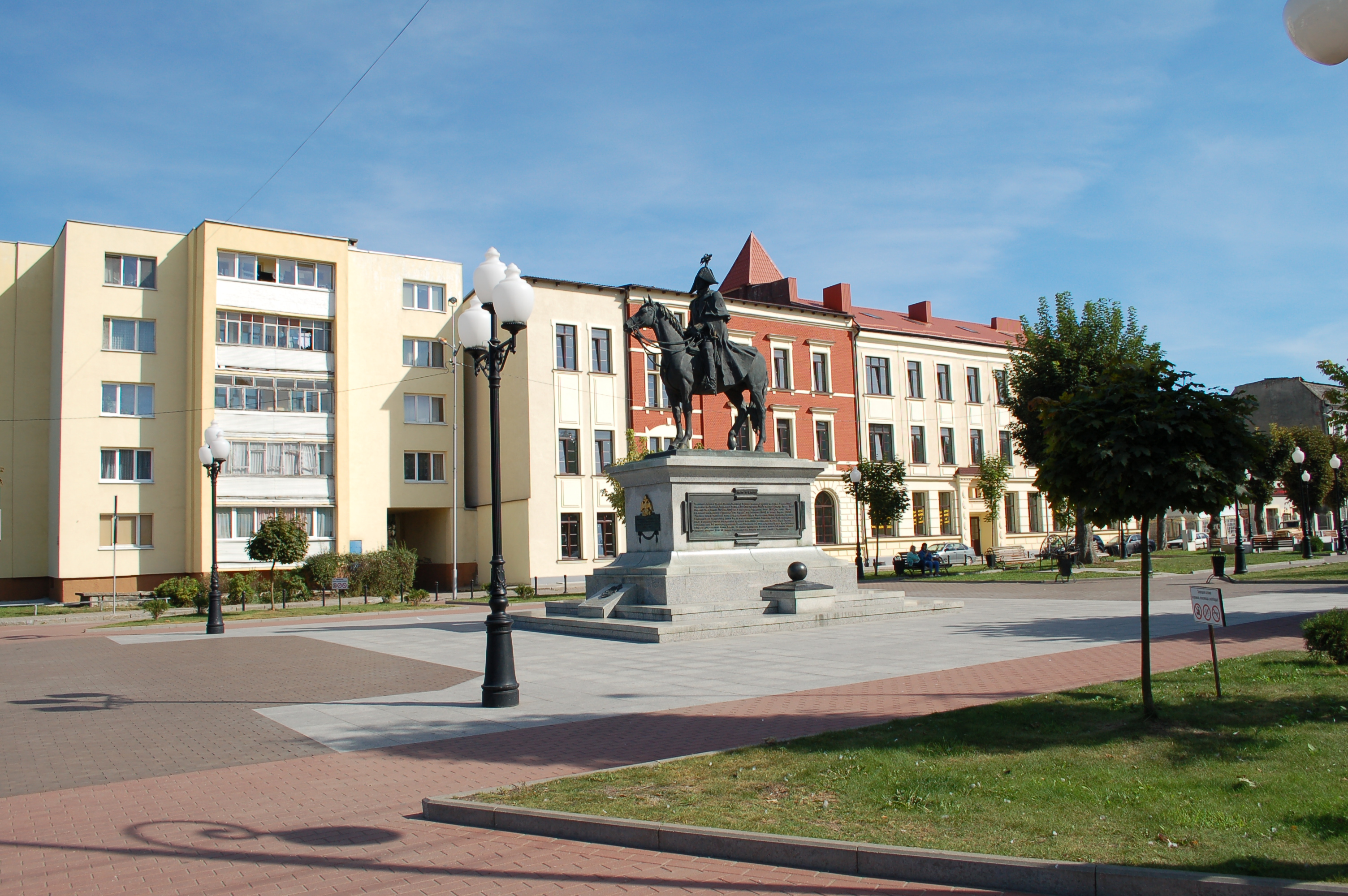
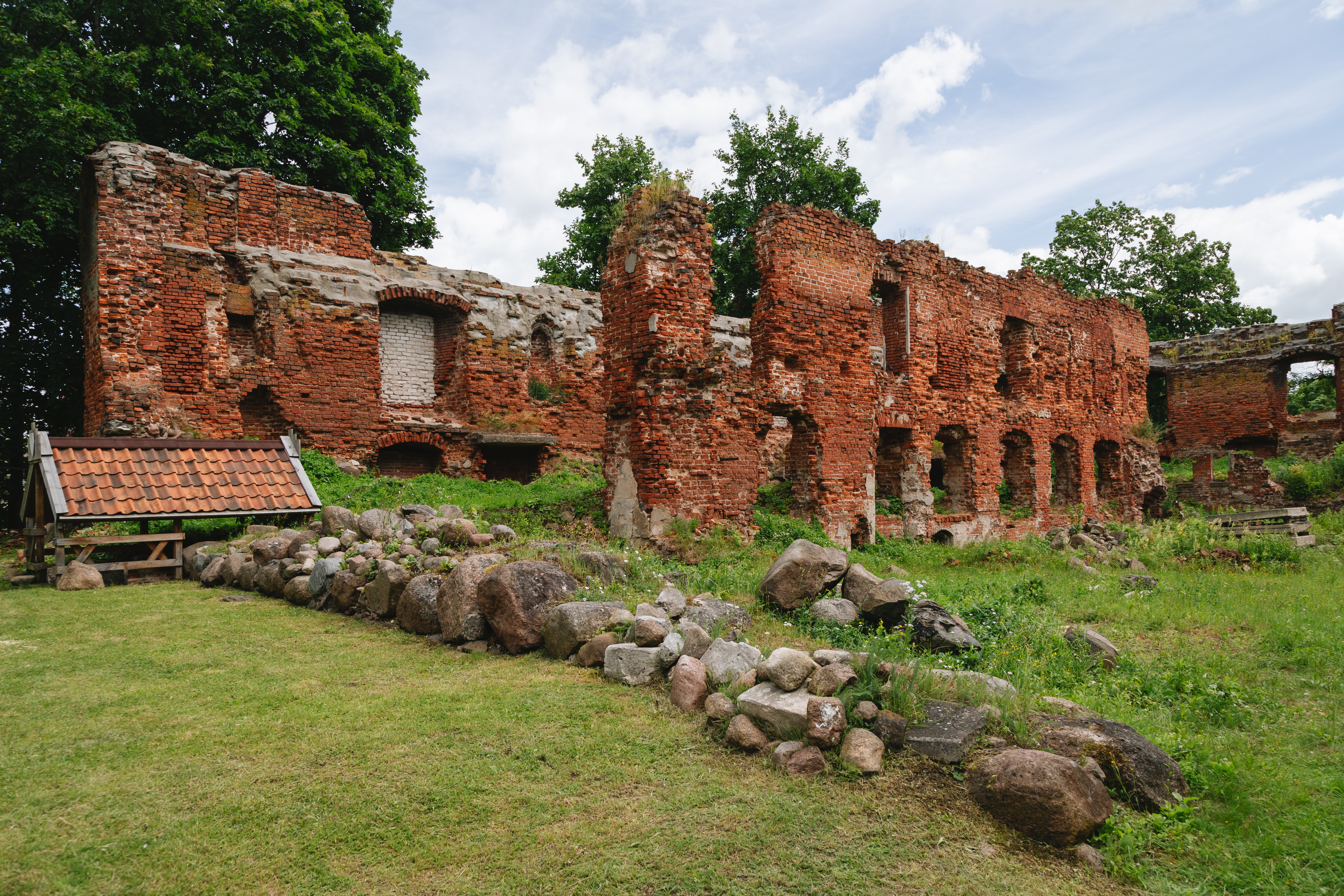
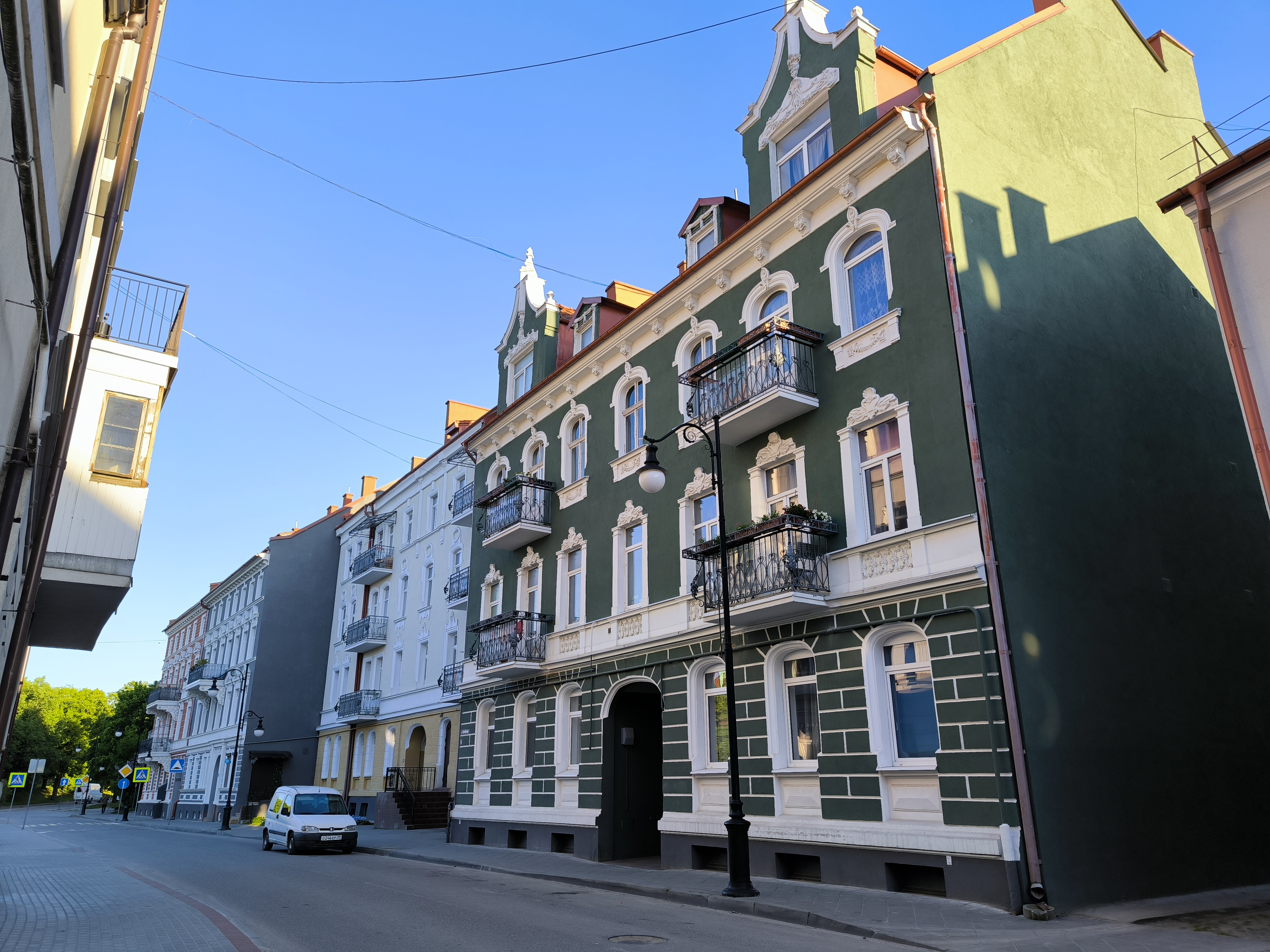
- Town centre and a statue of Michael Barclay de Tolly Medieval castle ruins Historic tenements

- Flag Coat of arms
- Interactive map of Chernyakhovsk
- Location of Chernyakhovsk Chernyakhovsk (European Russia) Chernyakhovsk (Europe)
- Coordinates: 54°38′05″N 21°48′43″E
- Country: Russia
- Federal subject: Kaliningrad Oblast
- Administrative district: Chernyakhovsky District
- Town of district significanceSelsoviet: Chernyakhovsk
- Founded: 1337
- Town status since: 10 October 1583

Area
  - Total: 58 km^{2} (22 sq mi)
- Elevation: 30 m (98 ft)

Population
  - Estimate (2025): 36,423 )
  - Density: 628/km^{2} (1,630/sq mi)

Administrative status
  - Capital of: Chernyakhovsky District, town of district significance of Chernyakhovsk

Municipal status
  - Municipal district: Chernyakhovsky Municipal District
  - Urban settlement: Chernyakhovskoye Urban Settlement
  - Capital of: Chernyakhovsky Municipal District, Chernyakhovskoye Urban Settlement
- Time zone: UTC+2 (MSK–1)
- Postal codes: 238150–238154, 238158, 238165, 238169, 238170, 238816
- Dialing code: +7 40141
- OKTMO ID: 27739000001
- Website: inster39.ru

Chernyakhovsk (Russian: Черняхо́вск; German: Insterburg; Lithuanian: Įsrutis; Polish: Wystruć) is a town in Kaliningrad Oblast, Russia, and the administrative center of Chernyakhovsky District. With a population of 35,705 as of 2023, it is the third-largest city of the Kaliningrad Oblast (behind Kaliningrad and Sovetsk).

It is located at the confluence of the Instruch and Angrapa rivers, which unite to become the Pregolya river below Chernyakhovsk.

Founded in 1337, it is one of the main towns of the region of Lithuania Minor. It was formerly inhabited by Lithuanians, Germans, Poles, Scots and French. It was the location of a German-operated prisoner-of-war camp for Allied POWs during World War II. It has a number of preserved heritage sights, including the ruins of two medieval castles and a historic stud farm. It hosts the Chernyakhovsk Air Base.

== History ==
=== Medieval period ===
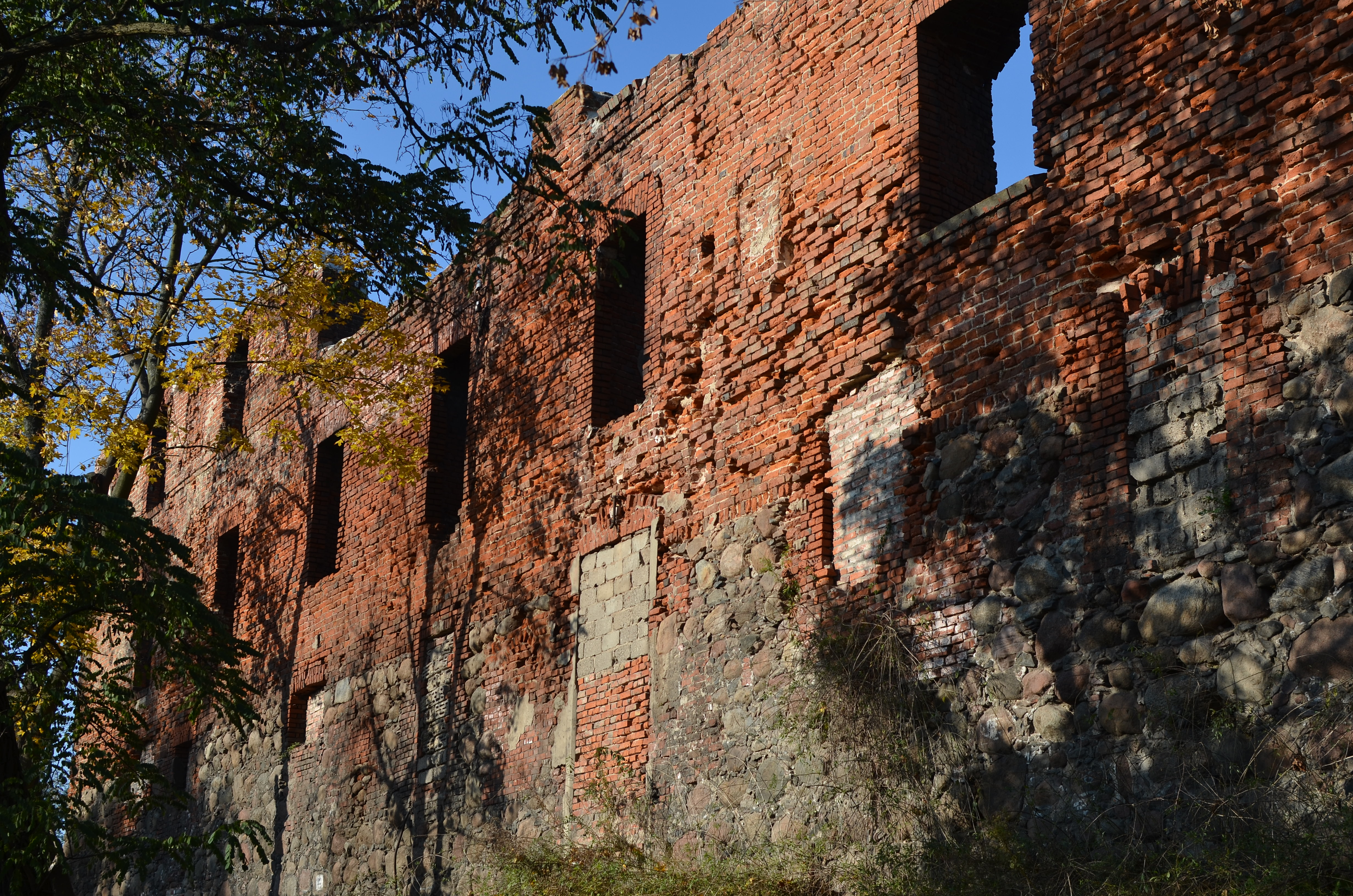
Medieval castle ruins

Insterburg was founded in 1337 by the Teutonic Knights on the site of a former Old Prussian fortification when Dietrich von Altenburg, the Grand Master of the Teutonic Knights, built a castle called Insterburg following the Prussian Crusade. During the Teutonic Knights' Northern Crusades campaign against the Grand Duchy of Lithuania, the town was devastated in 1376. The castle had been rebuilt as the seat of a Procurator and a settlement also named Insterburg grew up to serve it. In 1454, Polish King Casimir IV Jagiellon incorporated the region to the Kingdom of Poland upon the request of the Prussian Confederation, which rebelled against the Teutonic Order. During the subsequent Thirteen Years' War (1454–1466) between Poland and the Teutonic Knights, the settlement was devastated by Polish troops in 1457. As a result of the Second Peace of Thorn (1466), the settlement once again became part of the State of the Teutonic Order, which from then on was a vassal state of the Polish Crown.

=== Early modern period ===
When the Prussian Duke Albert of Brandenburg-Ansbach in 1525 secularized the monastic State of the Teutonic Order per the Treaty of Kraków, Insterburg became part of the Duchy of Prussia, a vassal duchy of the Kingdom of Poland. The settlement was granted town privileges on 10 October 1583 by the Prussian regent Margrave George Frederick. In the early 17th century, the town had a mixed population, and had Lithuanian, German and Polish preachers. From the 17th century also Scottish people settled for trade, contributing to the town's growth. It was a notable brewing center with beer sold in Poland. The populace also lived off crafts, agriculture, and trade in grain and flaxseed.

In 1678, during the Scanian War, the town was occupied by Sweden. In 1690, there was a fire. Insterburg became part of the Kingdom of Prussia in 1701. As the area had been depopulated by the Great Northern War plague outbreak in the early 18th century, King Frederick William I of Prussia invited Protestant refugees who had been expelled from the Archbishopric of Salzburg to settle in Insterburg in 1732. Also Swiss, Palatine and Nassau immigrants came to the town. French-language Calvinist church services were held in the town for several decades since 1731. During the Seven Years' War, the town was occupied by Russia.

=== Late modern period ===
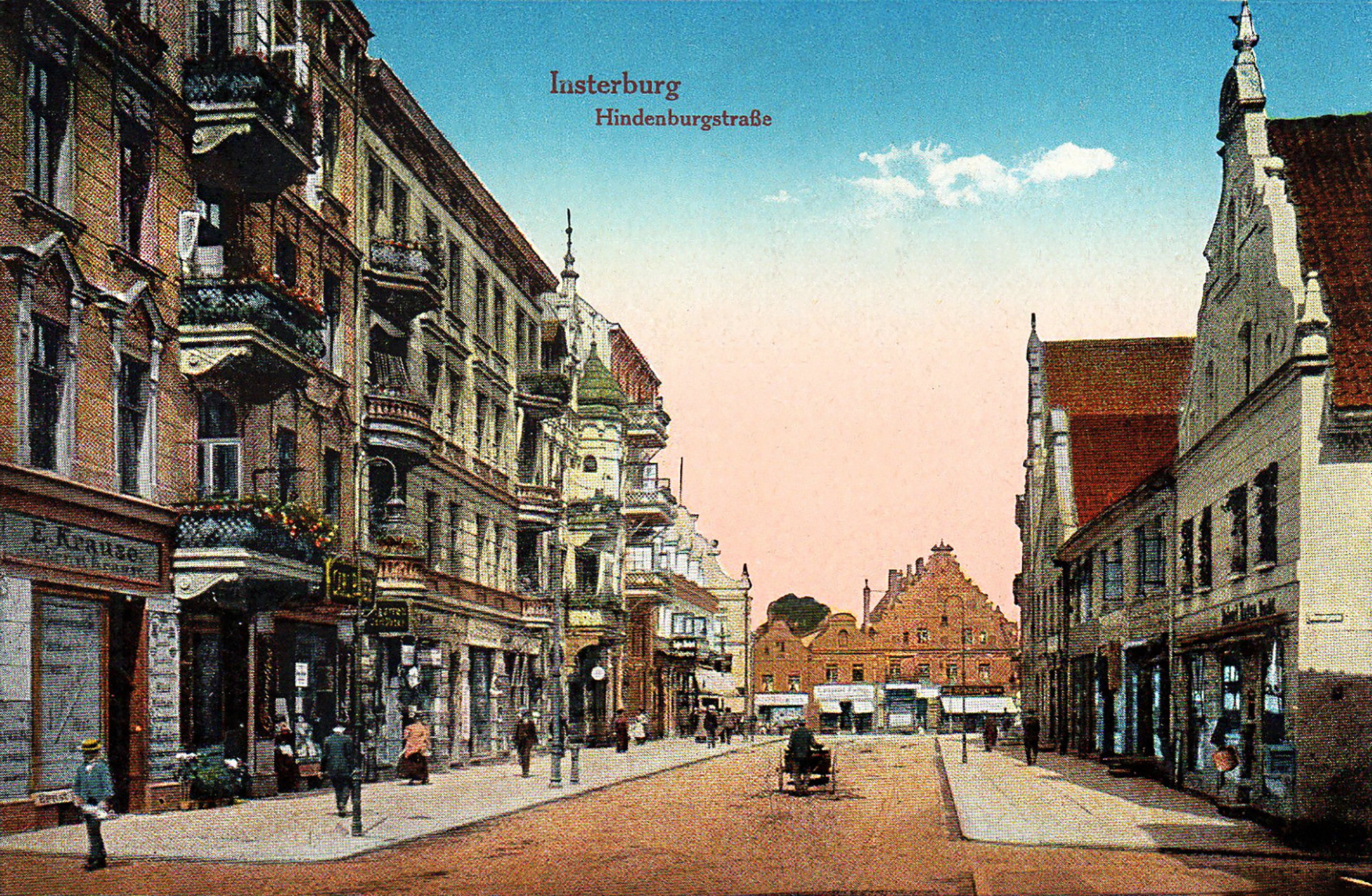
A postcard view of Insterburg's Hindenburgstraße in about 1890

During the Napoleonic Wars, French troops passed through the town in 1806, 1807, 1811 and 1813. In 1818, after the Napoleonic Wars, the town became the seat of Insterburg District within the Gumbinnen Region. Michael Andreas Barclay de Tolly died at Insterburg in 1818 on his way from his Livonian manor to Germany, where he wanted to renew his health. Following the unsuccessful November Uprising, Polish insurgents were interned in the town in 1832. In 1863, a Polish secret organization was founded and operated in Insterburg. It was involved in arms trafficking to the Russian Partition of Poland during the January Uprising, transporting endangered insurgents to the west and relaying information about the uprising to the west. Since May 1864, the leader of the organization was Józef Racewicz. The organization existed until December 1864, when it was crushed by the Prussian authorities as the last such organization in East Prussia. In April 1865, Józef Racewicz and 10 associates were put on trial in the city and ultimately acquitted. Despite the acquittal, the local Landrat wanted to hand the defendants over to the Russian authorities, so the local residents helped them escape arrest.

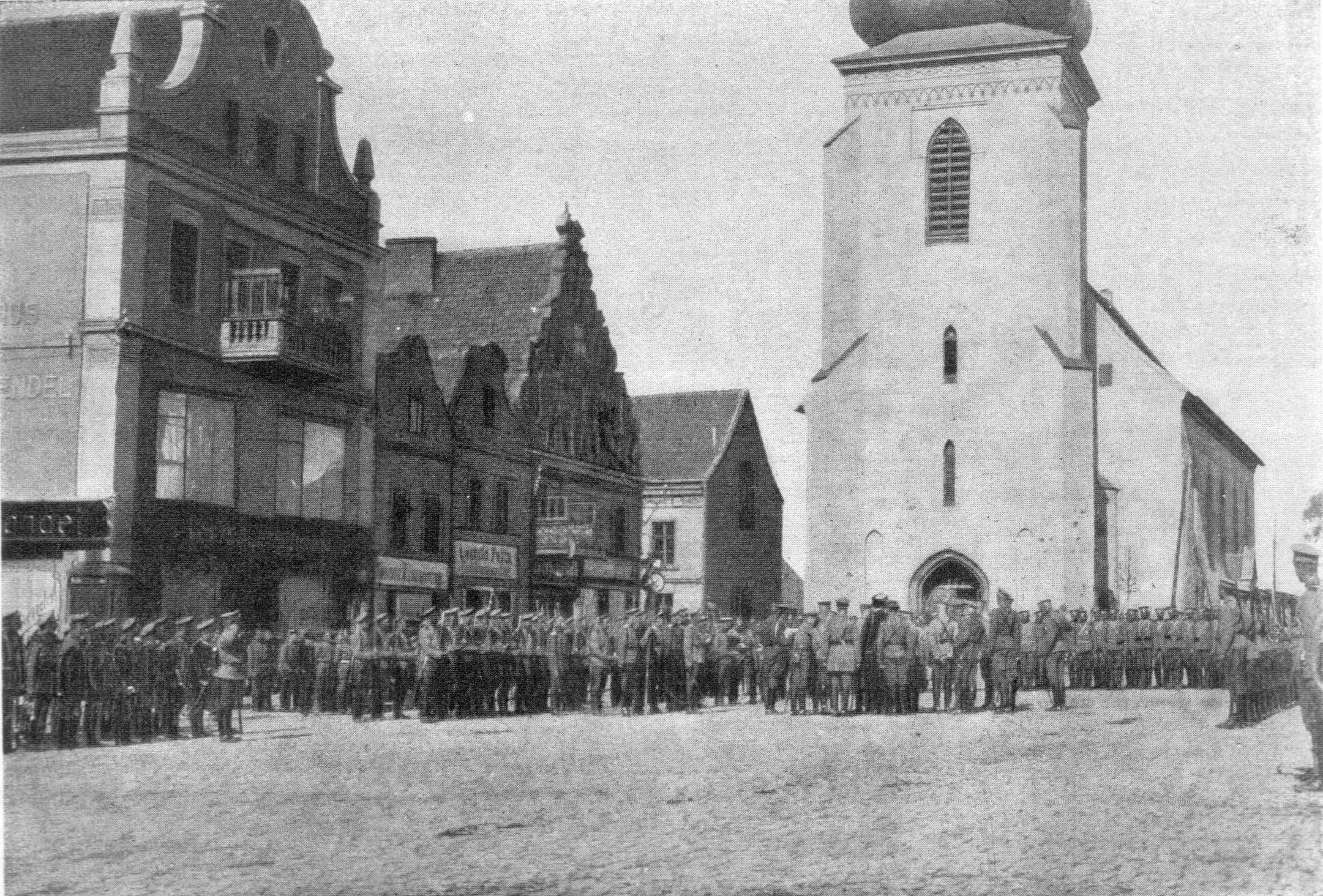
The Chevalier Guard Regiment and the Life Guard Horse Regiment of the Russian Imperial Guard in Insterburg

Insterburg became a part of the German Empire following the 1871 unification of Germany, and on May 1, 1901, it became an independent city separate from Insterburg District. During World War I the Russian Army seized Insterburg on 24 August 1914, but it was retaken by Germany on 11 September 1914. The Weimar Germany era after World War I saw the town separated from the rest of the country as the province of East Prussia had become an exclave. The association football club Yorck Boyen Insterburg was formed in 1921.

=== World War II and post-war period ===
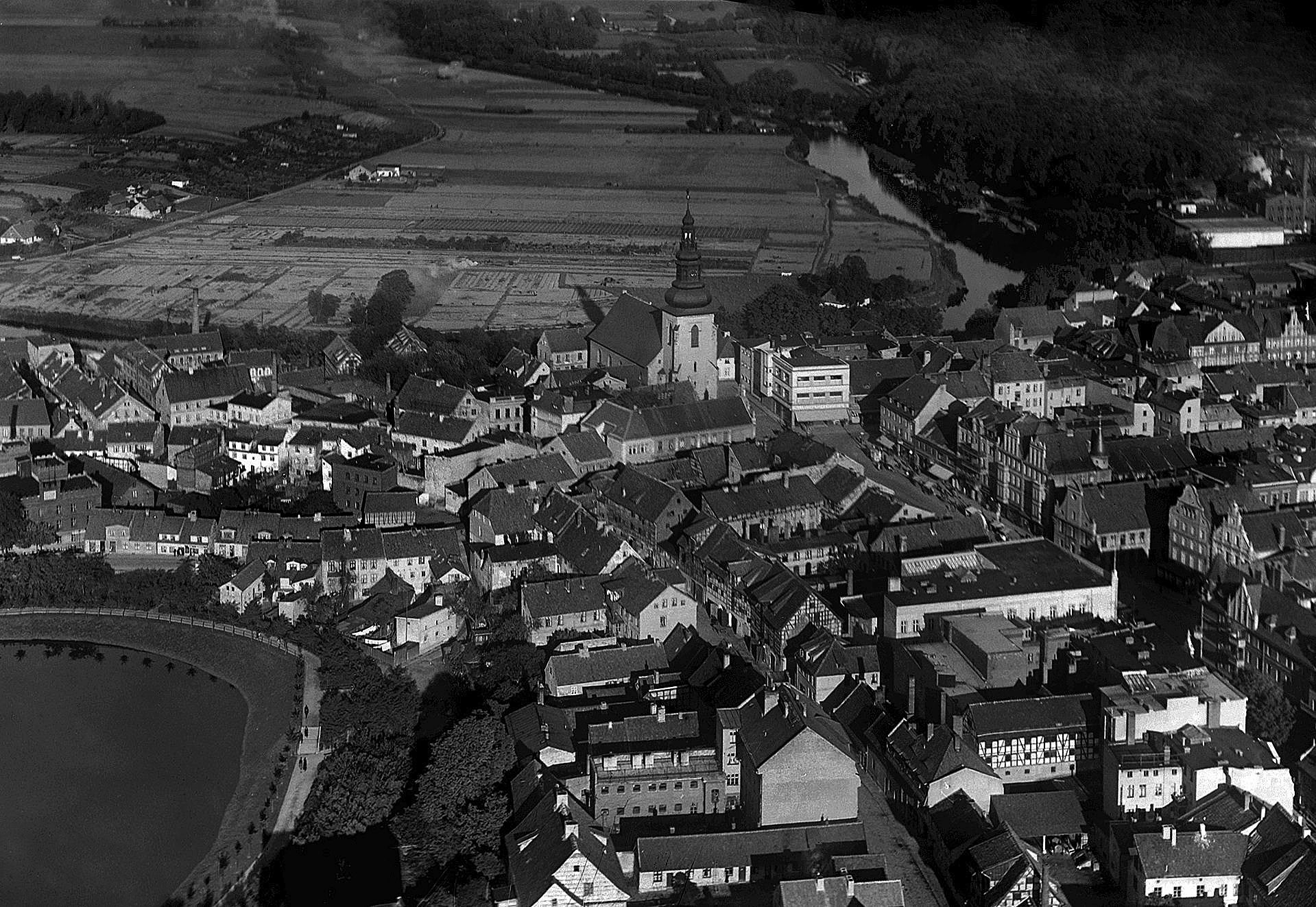
Aerial view before World War II

During World War II, the Germans operated a Dulag Luft transit prisoner-of-war camp for Allied POWs in the town. A local branch of the Peasant Battalions was established by the Polish resistance, under the cryptonym "Wystruć", the historic Polish name of the town. Several French forced laborers cooperated with the Polish resistance. The town was heavily bombed by the British Royal Air Force on July 27, 1944. The town was stormed by Red Army troops on January 21–22, 1945. As part of the northern part of East Prussia, Insterburg was transferred from Germany to the Soviet Union after the war as previously agreed between the victorious powers at the Potsdam Conference. On 7 April 1946, Insterburg was renamed as Chernyakhovsk in honor of the Soviet World War II Army General, Ivan Chernyakhovsky, who commanded the army that first entered East Prussia in 1944.

After 1989, a group of people introduced the Akhal-Teke horse breed to the area and opened an Akhal-Teke breeding stable. In 1993, the local St. Bruno church became the second church in the oblast to be returned to Catholics after the Fall of Communism. Franciscans from Poland came to serve there.

Mayovka, formerly a separate village, forms part of the town.

Historic churches

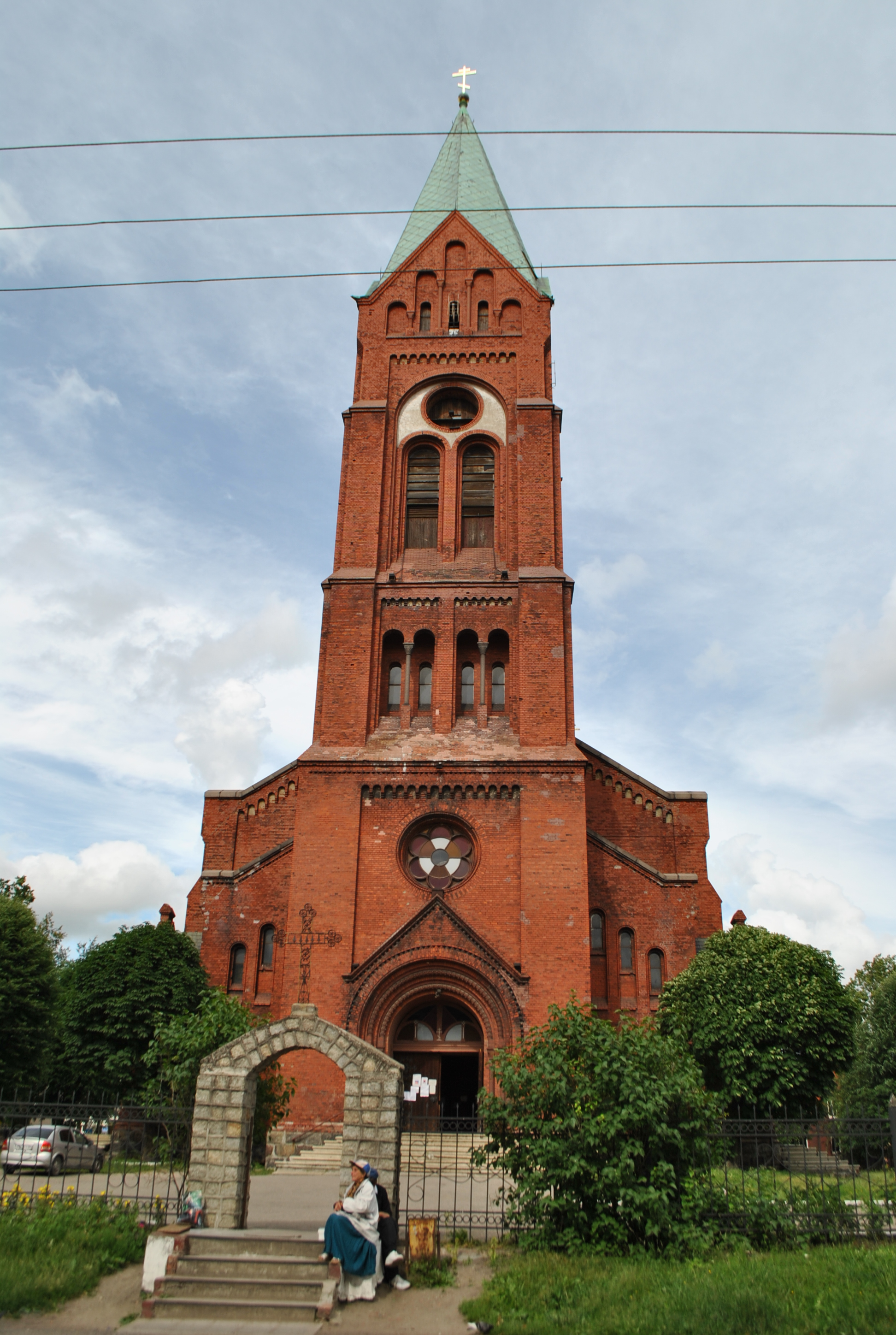
Saint Michael Archangel

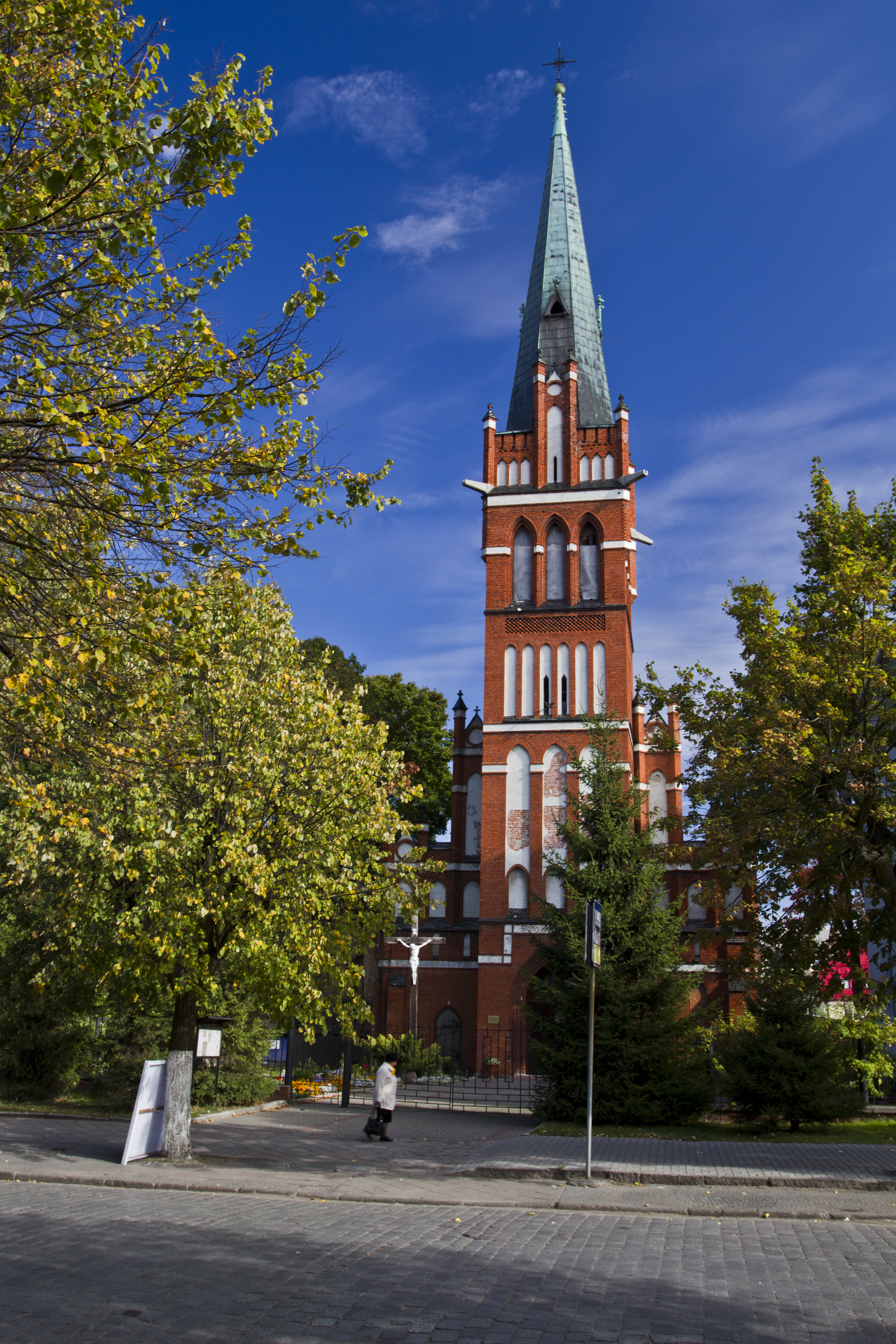
Saint Bruno

== Administrative and municipal status ==
Within the framework of administrative divisions, Chernyakhovsk serves as the administrative center of Chernyakhovsky District. As an administrative division, it is, together with five rural localities, incorporated within Chernyakhovsky District as the town of district significance of Chernyakhovsk. As a municipal division, the town of district significance of Chernyakhovsk is incorporated within Chernyakhovsky Municipal District as Chernyakhovskoye Urban Settlement.

== Population trends ==
Year	Number
1790	4,972, without military
1802	5,253
1810	4,726
1821	6,876
1831	7,338
1875	16,303
1880	18,745
1885	22,227
1890	31,624, incl. 437 Catholics and 348 Jews
1900	27,787, incl. 788 Catholics and 350 Jews
1910	31,624, incl. 29,672 Protestants and 1,040 Catholics
1925	39,311, incl. 36,792 Protestants, 1,174 Catholics, 86 other Christians, and 338 Jews
1933	41,230, incl. 39,458 Protestants, 1,078 Catholics, five other Christians, and 273 Jews
1939	43,620, incl. 40,677 Protestants, 1,388 Catholics, 563 other Christians, and 87 Jews
1959	approx. 29,100
1979	approx. 35,600
1989 Census	39,622
2002 Census	44,323
2010 Census	40,449

== Military ==
Chernyakhovsk is home to the Chernyakhovsk naval air facility.

== Coat of arms controversy ==
Coat of arms of Insterburg

In September 2019 the local court ruled that the coat of arms was illegal because it carries "elements of foreign culture." The local court alleged that Russian laws do not allow the use of foreign languages and symbols in Russian state symbols and ordered the town "to remove any violations of the law."

The town's coat of arms, adopted in 2002, was based on the historic coat of arms of the town that before 1946 was known under its original Prussian name – Insterburg.

The full version of coat of arms in question has a picture of a Prussian man with a horn and the Latin initials G.F. for the Regent of Prussia George Frederick, margrave of Brandenburg-Ansbach (1543–1603), who gave Insterburg the status of town and with it his family coat of arms.

The case brought before the court follows a trend among several towns in the region that have announced their intentions to change their coat of arms as tensions mount between Russia and the West following the annexation of Crimea by the Russian Federation in 2014 and its support for pro-Russian separatists in eastern Ukraine.

== Notable people ==
- Martin Grünberg (1665–c.1706), architect
- Johann Otto Uhde (1725–1766), composer and violinist
- Johann Friedrich Goldbeck (1748–1812), geographer and Protestant theologian
- Eduard Heinrich von Flottwell (1786–1865), politician
- Carl Friedrich Wilhelm Jordan (1819–1904), writer and politician
- Ernst Wichert (1831–1902), author
- Edward Frederick Moldenke (1836–1904) Lutheran theologian and missionary
- Hans Horst Meyer (1853–1939), pharmacologist
- Therese Malten (1855–1930), opera singer
- Hans Orlowski (1894–1967) woodcut artist and painter
- Hans Otto Erdmann (1896–1944), member of the German resistance to Nazism
- Fritz Karl Preikschat (1910–1994), engineer and inventor
- Kurt Kuhlmey (1913–1993), Bundeswehr major general
- Kurt Plenzat (1914–1998), military officer
- Traugott Buhre (1929–2009), actor
- Harry Boldt (born 1930), Olympic champion in dressage
- Anatol Herzfeld (1931–2019), German sculptor and mixed media artist
- Jürgen Schmude (1936–2025), politician (SPD)
- Hans-Jürgen Quadbeck-Seeger (born 1939), chemist
- Anatole Klyosov (born 1946), a scientist in physical chemistry, enzyme catalysis and industrial biochemistry
- Yuri Vasenin (1948–2022), Soviet football player and Russian coach

== Twin towns and sister cities ==
Chernyakhovsk is twinned with:

- Kirchheimbolanden, Germany, since 2002
