= Carl Friedrich Wilhelm Jordan =

German writer and politician

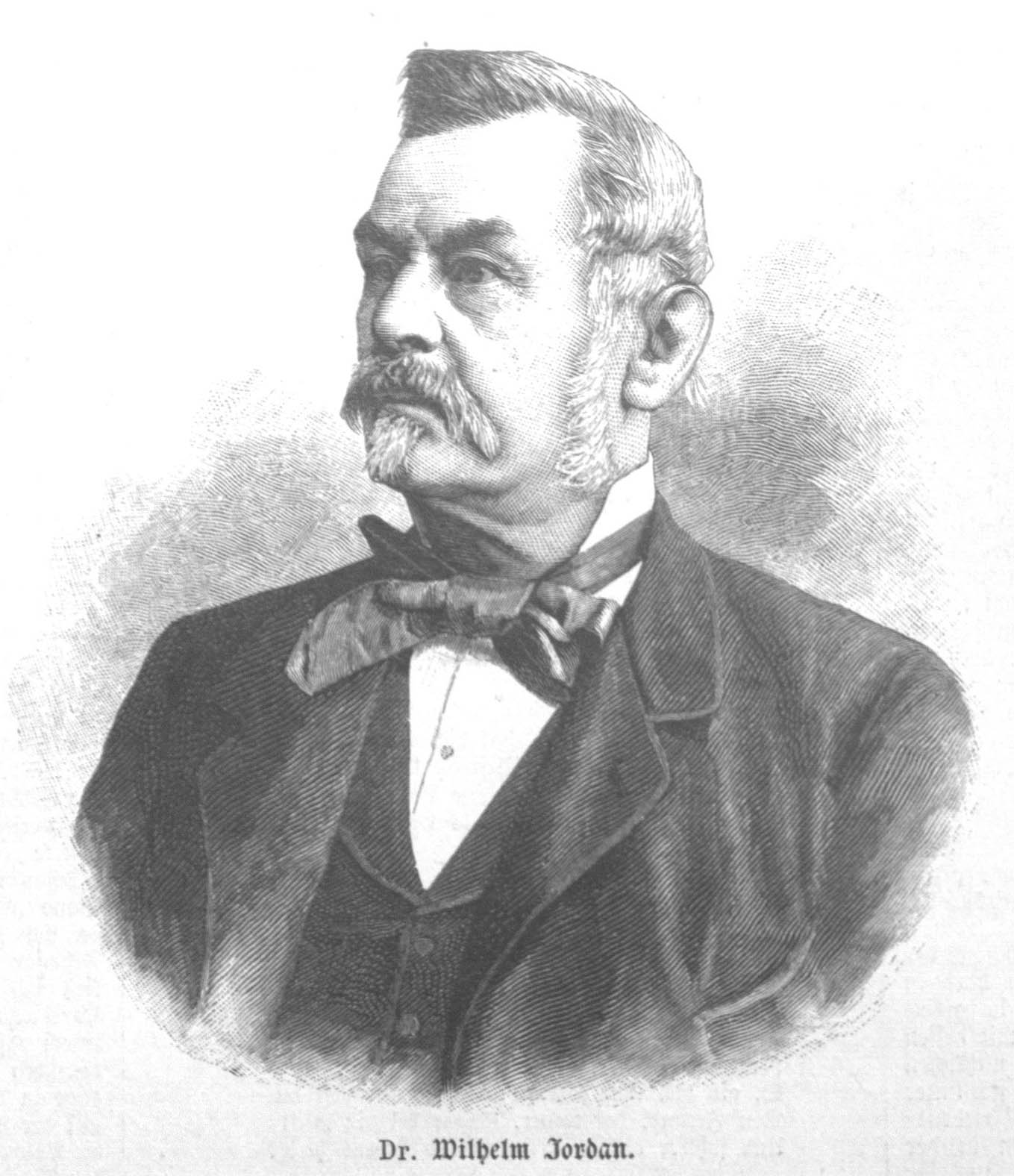
Portrait of Carl Friedrich Wilhelm Jordan

Carl Friedrich Wilhelm Jordan, sometimes shortened to Wilhelm Jordan (8 February 1819 in Insterburg in East Prussia, now in Russia – 25 June 1904 in Frankfurt am Main), was a German writer and politician.

== Life ==
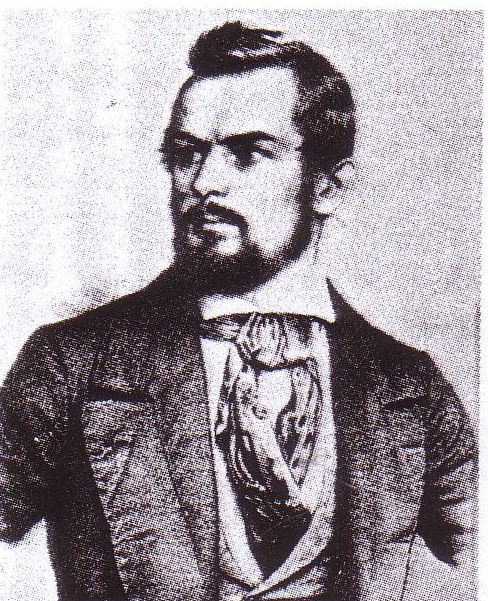
Wilhelm Jordan as a student in Königsberg

Jordan was the son of the pastor Charles Augustus Jordan and attended gymnasiums in Gumbinnen and Tilsit. From 1838 he studied theology at the University of Königsberg and became a member of the Corps Littuania. His university friends included the liberals Rudolf von Gottschall and Ferdinand Gregorovius – Jordan and Gregorovius read out the poem of welcome on behalf of the student body at the ceremony of homage for the king and queen of Prussia.

Thrilled by Feuerbach and Hegel, Jordan gave up his preacher course and switched to philosophy and the sciences. After graduating Doctor of Philosophy at the Albertus-Universität (1842) he moved to Berlin to work as a writer. In 1843 he was convicted of liberal anti-Christian writings and moved from Berlin to Leipzig, where in 1845–1846 he worked for the magazine Die begriffene Welt. He was expelled from Leipzig in 1846 for his political activities and moved to Bremen, where he worked for the Bremer Zeitung, becoming its foreign correspondent in Berlin and Paris.

From 18 May 1848 to 20 May 1849 he was the liberal member for Freienwalde in the Frankfurt Parliament, which he called the "great university of my life". There he joined Heinrich von Gagern and called for a greater German Empire led by Prussia. For this reason, in a speech on 24 July 1848 in a debate about the 'Drang nach Osten', he argued against restoring an independent Polish nation state and against supporting the Polish struggle for independence. Poles, he claimed, would soon join Russians and "life and death" struggle would ensue with Germans. Jordan claimed that "German race" is superior to most of "Slavic races" and claimed that Germans have a "right of conquest" and "right of strength" over other nations naming Poles as "lesser" one.

On this matter he called for a "gesunden Volksegoismus" (a healthy Volk-egoism), which quickly became a buzzword for his opponent Robert Blum and was also developed into the "national egoism" advocated by the Polish nationalist Roman Dmowski. Jordan was also on the Marinerat in the Reichshandelsministerium (Reich trade ministry) and worked on building a national fleet.

After his retirement, he went on many lecture tours, popularising the Nibelungenlied among other things; one of these lectures took him to the US in 1871. On his eightieth birthday, his birthplace of Insterburg made him an honorary citizen.

== Publications ==
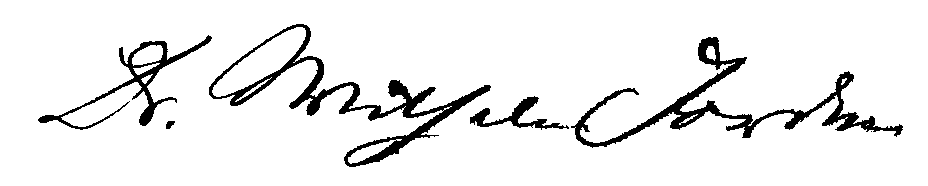
Signature as Dr. Wilhelm Jordan

His literary works are rooted in 19th-century historicism and profoundly influenced by Ludwig Klages and his school friend Theodor Lessing. His plays, poems and novels are dominated by philosophical and scientific ideas. His main work was his Nibelungen-Epos, written in Stabreim (alliterative verse) - in it, he used the Old Norse saga of the same name and the Lay of Hildebrand as his main sources but subjected the action to a time-related psychological interpretation.

In the 19th century he was often seen (in the words of René Simon Taube) as "a precursor of Nietzsche and pioneer of Darwin in Germany". Today his work is little-known, except for his 'mysterium' Demiurgos and his translation of the Elder Edda, both still in use due to their sensitive language and epic depth. His Demiurgos cannot, as is generally claimed, be considered as the "first serious biography of Max Stirner". It is more of a literary sketch rather than a biographical account of Stirner's life, especially since he is only mentioned in one section rather than throughout the work.

=== List of works ===
- Irdische Phantasien (lyric poem, 1842)
- Schaum (lyric poem, 1846)
- Demiurgos (Mysterium, 1852)
- Die Witwe des Agis (play, 1857)
- Die Nibelungen (epic poem, 1867)
- Durchs Ohr (Lustspiel, 1870)
- Strophen und Stäbe (lyric poem, 1871)
- Artur Arden (play, 1872)
- Hildebrandts Heimkehr (epic poem, 1874)
- Epische Briefe (1876)
- Andachten (lyric poem, 1877)
- Sein Zwillingsbruder (Lustspiel, 1883)
- Tausch enttäuscht (Lustspiel, 1884)
- Die Sebald (novel, 1885)
- Zwei Wiegen (novel, 1887)
- Feli Dora (verse novella, 1889)
- Edda (translation of the Elder Edda, 1889) (republished, Arun-Verlag, Engerda 2002, ISBN 3-935581-03-3)
- Deutsche Hiebe (lyric poem, 1891)
- Die Liebesleugner (Lustspiel, 1892)
- Liebe, was du lieben darfst (Lustspiel, 1892)
- Letzte Lieder (lyric poem, 1892)
- Demiurgos. Ein Mysterium. Sechstes Buch (1854). Leipzig 1999. Stirneriana Heft 16. ISBN 3-933287-29-4

== Bibliography ==
- (in German) Nachruf: Academische Monatshefte, 1. August 1904.
- (in German) Josef Bendel: Zeitgenössische Dichter. Stuttgart: Metzler 1882.
- (in German) Willibald Jansen: Wilhelm Jordan. Anregungen für das Studium seiner Werke. Berlin: Gerdes u. Hödel 1910. (= Zur Fortbildung des Lehrers; 28)
- (in German) Franz Koch: Wilhelm Jordans 'Demiurgos'. Berlin 1942. (= Abhandlungen der Preußischen Akademie der Wiss. Phil.-hist. Kl.; 1942,1)
- (in German) Karl Schiffner: Wilhelm Jordan. Frankfurt am Main: Osterrieth 1889.
- (in German) Paul Scholz: Wilhelm Jordans Reden in der Paulskirche. Studien zur parlamentarischen Beredsamkeit. Königsberg Preußen: Gräfe u. Unzer 1930.
- (in German) Max Schüler: Wilhelm Jordan. Sechs Aufsätze zur 100. Wiederkehr seines Geburtstages am 8. Februar 1919. Frankfurt am Main: Diesterweg 1919.
- (in German) Maurice Reinhold von Stern: Wilhelm Jordan. Ein deutsches Dichter- und Charakterbild. Frankfurt am Main: Lüstenöder 1910.
- (in German) René Simon Taube: Das Bild Max Stirners in der deutschen Literatur um die Mitte des 19. Jahrhunderts. (1958), hrsg. v. Kurt W. Fleming. Leipzig: Max-Stirner-Archiv 1999. (= Stirneriana; 17) – Wilhelm Jordan ist einer der ersten Autoren, die Max Stirner literarisch (episch) verarbeiteten, neben Robert Giseke: "Moderne Titanen"
- (in German) Egbert Weiß: "Corpsstudenten in der Paulskirche", in Einst und Jetzt, Sonderheft 1990, Munich 1990, S. 25.
