= Udi =

Udi may refer to:

== Places ==
- Udi, Enugu State, a local government area and city in Nigeria
- Udi Hills, Enugu State, Nigeria
- Udi, a place in the Etawah district of Uttar Pradesh, India

== People ==
=== Given name ===
- Udi Aloni (born 1959), Israeli-American filmmaker, writer, visual artist and political activist
- Udi Davidi (born 1975), Israeli singer, musician, lyricist and composer
- Udi Gal (born 1979), Israeli Olympic sailor
- Udi Hrant Kenkulian (1901–1978), Armenian musician and composer
- Udi Manber, Israeli computer scientist

=== Nickname (short for Ehud) ===
- Udi Adam (born 1958), Israeli former general
- Udi Dekel (born c. 1957), Israeli former brigadier general
- Ehud Goldwasser (1975–2006), Israeli soldier ambushed and killed by Hezbollah
- Ehud Shani (born 1957), Israeli general
- Udi Spielman (born 1951), Israeli singer and hazzan
- Ehud Vaks (born 1979), Israeli Olympic judoka

=== Surname ===
- Duke Udi (born 1976), Nigerian former football player and coach

== Other uses ==
- Udi people of the Caucasus
- Udi language of the Caucasus
- Udi’s Healthy Foods, a brand of products by Boulder Brands

== See also ==
- UDI (disambiguation)
- Daybreak in Udi, a 1949 documentary film and winner of an Academy Award for Best Documentary Feature
