= Johann Otto Uhde =

Johann Otto Uhde (born Insterburg 12 May 1725; died Berlin 20 December 1766) was a German composer and violinist.

Although he studied violin from age 8 and performed as a soloist in high social circles in Berlin, Kingdom of Prussia, Uhde became an attorney and practised law in Berlin from 1746 to his death. As an amateur musician he exemplified a movement in the mid-18th century toward amateur music making. He is primarily remembered, however, as a composer, especially of music for amateurs and students. Several of his compositions were published anonymously in Berlin (most likely in anthologies such as the Musikalisches Mancherley and the Musikalischen Nebenstunden).

His manuscripts were acquired by the Harvard University library when it acquired the music collection of Franz Hauser (1794-1870). They include three violin concertos (E-flat, D minor, A minor), two flute concertos, a harpsichord concerto, a trio sonata, and 8 vocal works (cantatas and arias in French, German, and Italian).
