= Uda (surname) =

Uda (written: 宇田) is a Japanese surname. Notable people with the surname include:

- Arua Uda (born 1974), Papua New Guinean cricketer
- Emperor Uda (宇多天皇, 866–931), the 59th emperor of Japan
- Emperor Go-Uda (後宇多天皇, 1267–1324), the 91st emperor of Japan
- Hideki Uda (宇田 秀生, born 1987), Japanese Paralympic triathlete
- Kōnosuke Uda (宇田 鋼之介, born 1966), Japanese anime director
- Shintaro Uda (宇田 新太郎, 1896–1976), Japanese inventor
- Takatsugu Uda (宇田 崇二, born 1991), Japanese cross-country skier
- Yuka Uda (宇田 由香, 1982–2010), Japanese road cyclist
- Yukiya Uda (宇田 幸矢, born 2001), Japanese table tennis player
