= Udi Dekel =

Israeli general (born c. 1957)

Ehud "Udi" Dekel (Hebrew: אהוד "אודי" דקל; born c. 1957) is a former Israeli army brigadier general. He was head of the Planning Directorate of the Israel Defense Forces and is now deputy director of the Institute for National Security Studies.

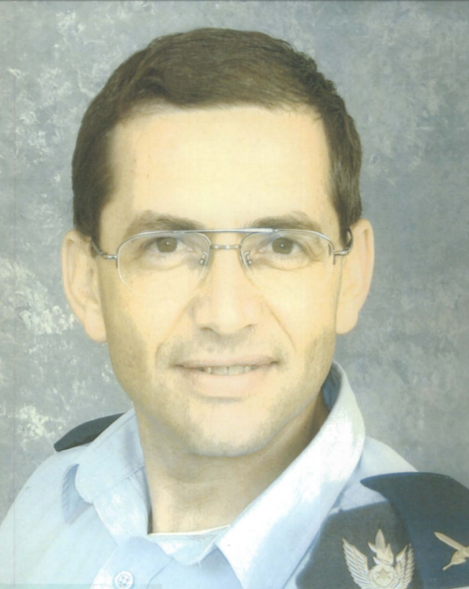
Udi Dekel

Dekel's military career began in the Israeli Air Force. He headed the Air Intelligence Group in the mid-1990s and then was chief of the External Relations Division of the IDF. He served as the IAF's representative in peace negotiations with the Palestinians.

Prime Minister Ehud Olmert appointed Dekel to lead the Israeli negotiating team in the peace talks that followed the Annapolis Conference in early 2008. He helped formulate Israeli positions in negotiations.

Since leaving government, Dekel has served in Track II diplomacy under the auspices of the S. Daniel Abraham Center for Strategic Dialogue at Netanya Academic College and funded by the European Union. His working group, composed of Israelis, Palestinians, and Jordanians, is studying the regional security implications of creating a Palestinian state.

Dekel is also a researcher at the Jerusalem Center for Public Affairs.
