= United Democratic Alliance =

United Democratic Alliance may refer to:

- United Democratic Alliance (Liberia)
- United Democratic Alliance (Zambia)
- United Democratic Alliance (Kenya)
- United Democratic Alliance (Nagaland)
- Malaysian United Democratic Alliance
