= Sztynort =

- Village
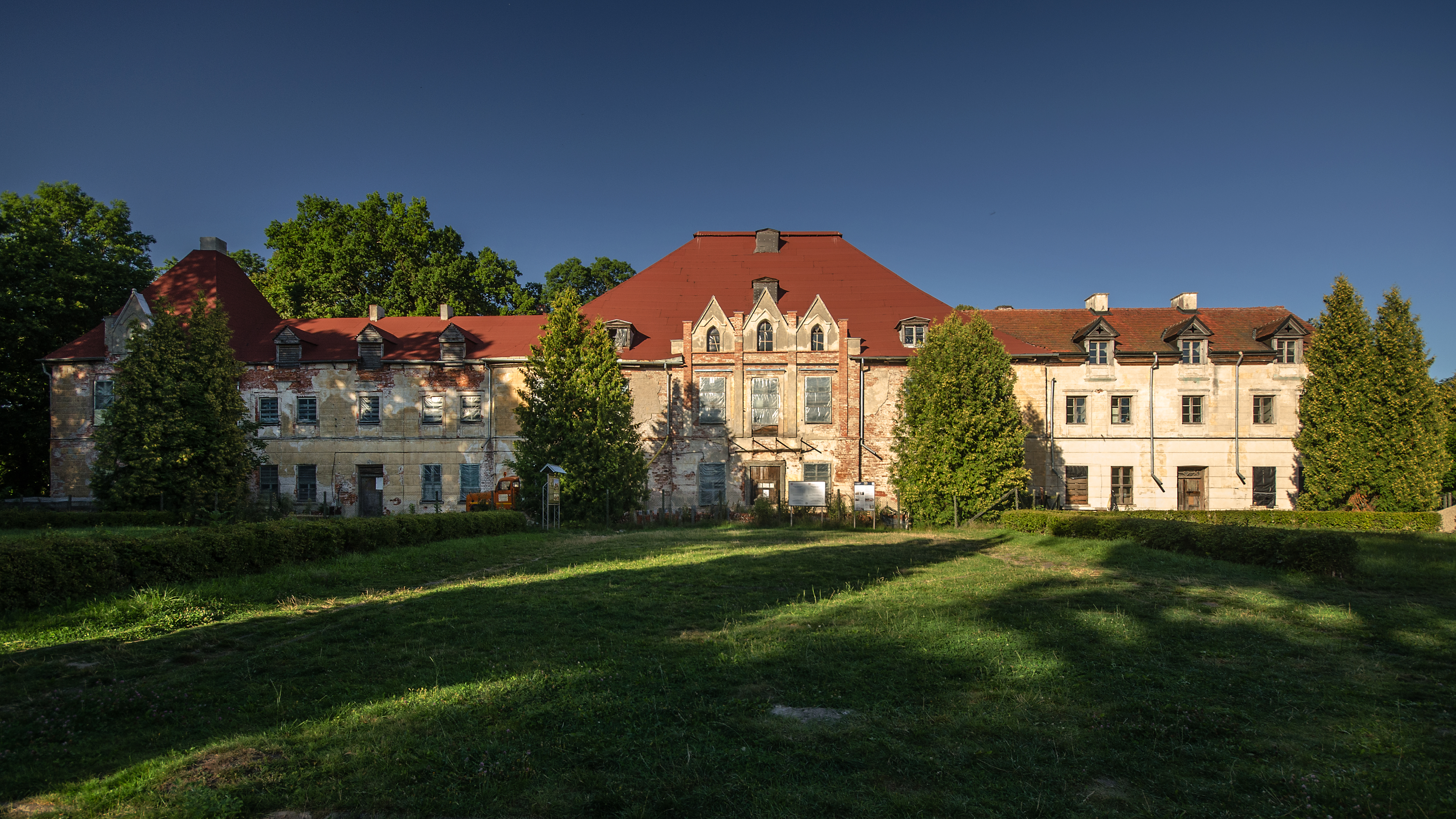
- Lehndorff Palace in 2015

- Location within Poland
- Coordinates: 54°7′54″N 21°41′5″E
- Country: Poland
- Voivodeship: Warmian-Masurian
- County: Węgorzewo
- Gmina: Węgorzewo

Population
  - Total: 170
- Time zone: UTC+1 (CET)
  - Summer (DST): UTC+2 (CEST)
- Vehicle registration: NWE

Sztynort [ˈʂtɨnɔrt] (German: Steinort) is a village in the administrative district of Gmina Węgorzewo, within Węgorzewo County, Warmian-Masurian Voivodeship, in north-eastern Poland, close to the border with the Kaliningrad Oblast of Russia. It is situated in the historic region of Masuria.

== History ==
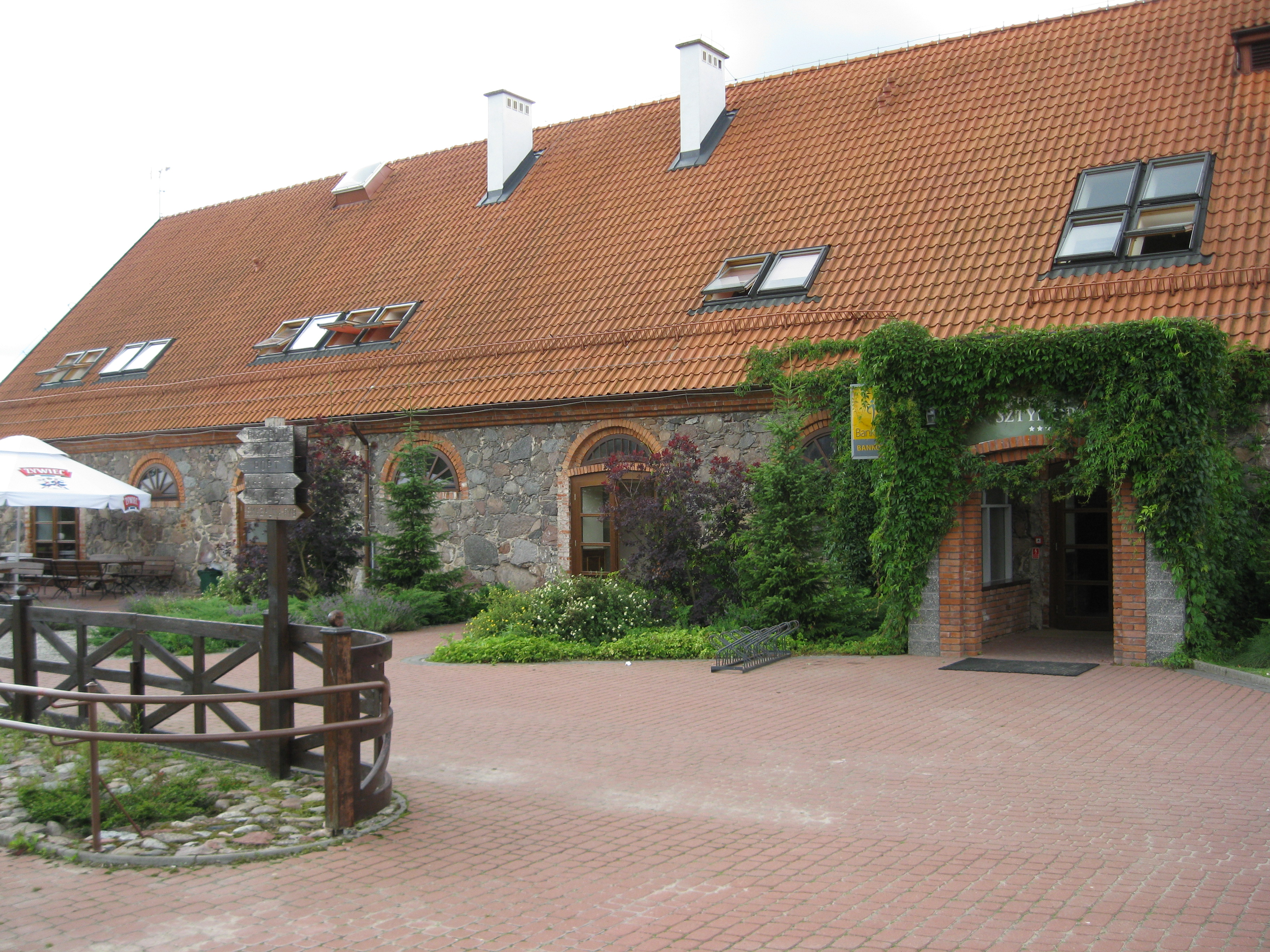
Former farm buildings of the palace complex, now a restaurant

In 1454, King Casimir IV Jagiellon incorporated the area to the Kingdom of Poland upon the request of the anti-Teutonic Prussian Confederation. After the subsequent Thirteen Years' War (1454–1466), the village became a part of Poland as a fief held by Teutonic Order.

The village was the property of the Lehndorff family since 1420 (by other sources since 1565) until 1944. The current palace was built by Marie Eleonore von Lehndorff née von Dönhoff, wife of Ahasverus von Lehndorff, chamberlain of King John II Casimir of Poland, after an older building had been destroyed by Crimean Tatars in the Second Northern War in 1656. Ahasverus and Marie Eleonore often hosted Polish Baroque poet Zbigniew Morsztyn in the palace. In the 18th century, the village was often visited by leading Polish Enlightenment poet Ignacy Krasicki.

From the 18th century, the village formed part of the Kingdom of Prussia, and from 1871 it was also part of the German Empire. In the late 19th century, the village had a population of 536, mostly employed in agriculture, cattle breeding and fishing. The fish were sold to the Russian Partition of Poland.

German Foreign minister Joachim von Ribbentrop used the palace throughout his sojourns at the nearby Wolf's Lair between 1941 and 1944. The last proprietor of the estate, Heinrich Count von Lehndorff, was executed by the Nazis for his participation in the plot against Hitler that failed with the faulty assassination attempt on 20 July 1944, at the nearby Wolf's Lair wartime military headquarters of the Nazi regime. During World War II, the German administration operated a subcamp of the Stutthof concentration camp in the village, intended for female prisoners.

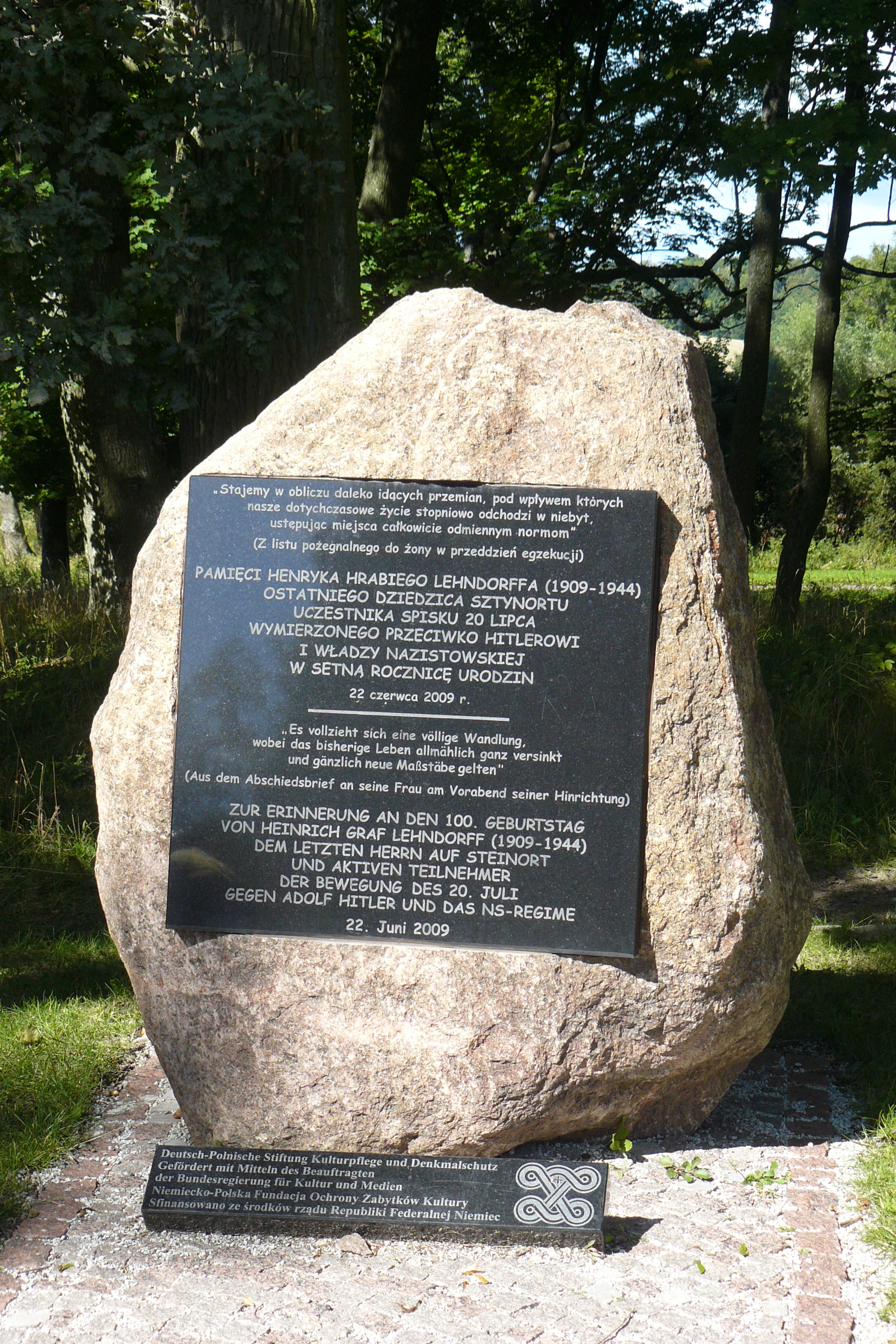
Memorial stone to Heinrich von Lehndorff, unveiled on his 100's birthday

After Germany's defeat in the war, the village became again part of Poland, although with a Soviet-installed communist regime, which stayed in power until the 1980s. The palace was occupied by the Red Army until 1947, and the farm buildings were used as a depot for livestock stolen by the Russians from Masuria, which was then taken to the Soviet Union. An agricultural cooperative moved in in 1950. In 2009, it could still be viewed only from the outside, the interior, neglected for more than half a century, having become badly degraded.

In November 2009, the ownership of the palace was transferred to the German-Polish Foundation for Cultural Maintenance and historic Preservation (Deutsch-Polnische Stiftung Kulturpflege und Denkmalschutz), and reconstruction of the ruins began in 2010.

== Notable residents ==
- Heinrich Graf von Lehndorff-Steinort (1909-1944), resistance fighter (daughter/model)-Veruschka von Lehndorff
