= Privy Council (United Kingdom) =

Formal body of advisers to the British monarch

His Majesty's Most Honourable Privy Council
- Arms used by the Privy Council Office
- Abbreviation: Privy Council (PC)
- Predecessor: Privy Council of England (until 1707); Privy Council of Scotland (until 1707); Privy Council of Ireland (until 1922); Privy Council of Northern Ireland (1922–72); Privy Council of Great Britain (1708–1800)
- Formation: 1 January 1801
- Legal status: Advisory body
- Members: Members of the Privy Council
- Monarch: Charles III (King-in-Council)
- Lord President: Alan Campbell
- Clerk: Richard Tilbrook
- Deputy Clerk: Ceri King
- Staff: Privy Council Office
- Website: privycouncil.independent.gov.uk

The Privy Council, formally His Majesty's Most Honourable Privy Council, is a formal body of advisers to the sovereign of the United Kingdom. Its members, known as privy counsellors, are mainly senior politicians who are current or former members of either the House of Commons or the House of Lords.

The Privy Council formally advises the sovereign on the exercise of the royal prerogative. The King-in-Council issues executive instruments known as Orders in Council. The Privy Council also holds the delegated authority to issue Orders of Council, mostly used to regulate certain public institutions. It advises the sovereign on the issuing of royal charters, which are used to grant special status to incorporated bodies, and city or borough status to local authorities. Otherwise, the Privy Council's powers have now been largely reserved to its executive committee, the Cabinet of the United Kingdom, which thus serves as the senior decision-making body of the government. The council is administratively headed by the Lord President of the Council who is a member of the cabinet, and is appointed on the advice of the Prime Minister.

Certain judicial functions are also performed by the King-in-Council, although in practice its actual work of hearing and deciding upon cases is carried out day-to-day only by the Judicial Committee of the Privy Council. The Judicial Committee consists of senior judges appointed as privy counsellors: predominantly justices of the Supreme Court of the United Kingdom, as well as some senior judges from other Commonwealth nations. The Privy Council by its Judicial Committee was formerly the final court of appeal for litigants in courts throughout the British Empire (but not for most cases in the United Kingdom itself). It continues to be the highest court of appeal for some Commonwealth countries, Crown Dependencies, British Overseas Territories, as well as for a few institutions in the United Kingdom.

== History ==
The Privy Council of the United Kingdom, created on 1 January 1801, was preceded by the Privy Council of Scotland, the Privy Council of England, and the Privy Council of Great Britain (1708–1800). Its continued existence has been described as "more or less a constitutional and historical accident". The key events in the formation of the modern Privy Council are given below:

In Anglo-Saxon England, the Witenagemot was an early equivalent to the Privy Council of England. During the reigns of the Norman monarchs, the English Crown was advised by a royal court or curia regis, which consisted of magnates, ecclesiastics and high officials. The body originally concerned itself with advising the sovereign on legislation, administration and justice. Later, different bodies assuming distinct functions evolved from the court. The courts of law took over the business of dispensing justice, while Parliament became the supreme legislature of the kingdom. Nevertheless, the Council retained the power to hear legal disputes, either in the first instance or on appeal. Furthermore, laws made by the sovereign on the advice of the Council, rather than on the advice of Parliament, were accepted as valid. Powerful sovereigns often used the body to circumvent the Courts and Parliament. For example, a committee of the Council—which later became the Court of the Star Chamber—was during the 15th century permitted to inflict any punishment except death, without being bound by normal court procedure. During Henry VIII's reign, the sovereign, on the advice of the Council, was allowed to enact laws by mere proclamation. The legislative pre-eminence of Parliament was not restored until after Henry VIII's death. By 1540 the nineteen-member council had become a new national institution, most probably the creation of Thomas Cromwell, without there being exact definitions of its powers. Though the royal Council retained legislative and judicial responsibilities, it became a primarily administrative body. In 1553 the Council consisted of forty members, whereas Henry VII swore over a hundred servants to his council. Sovereigns relied on a smaller working committee which evolved into the modern Cabinet.

By the end of the English Civil War, the monarchy, House of Lords, and Privy Council had been abolished. The remaining parliamentary chamber, the House of Commons, instituted a Council of State to execute laws and to direct administrative policy. The forty-one members of the Council were elected by the House of Commons; the body was headed by Oliver Cromwell, de facto military dictator of the nation. In 1653, however, Cromwell became Lord Protector, and the Council was reduced to between thirteen and twenty-one members, all elected by the Commons. In 1657, the Commons granted Cromwell even greater powers, some of which were reminiscent of those enjoyed by monarchs. The Council became known as the Protector's Privy Council; its members were appointed by the Lord Protector, subject to Parliament's approval.

In 1659, shortly before the restoration of the monarchy, the Protector's Council was abolished. King Charles II restored the Royal Privy Council, but he, like previous Stuart monarchs, chose to rely on a small group of advisers. The formation of the Kingdom of Great Britain in 1707 combined the Privy Councils of England and Scotland, the latter body coming to an end in 1708.

Under King George I, even more power transferred to a small committee of the Council, which began to meet in the absence of the sovereign, communicating its decisions to him after the fact. Thus, the Privy Council, as a whole, ceased to be a body of important confidential advisers to the Sovereign; the role passed to a committee of the Council, now known as the Cabinet.

With the creation of the United Kingdom on 1 January 1801, a single Privy Council was created for Great Britain and Ireland, although the Privy Council of Ireland continued to function until 1922, when it became defunct upon the creation of the Irish Free State as an independent Dominion outside the United Kingdom, but within the British Empire. The Privy Council of Northern Ireland was created in 1922, but became defunct in 1972, when the Parliament of Northern Ireland was closed down.

== Functions ==
The sovereign may make Orders in Council upon the advice of the Privy Council. Orders in Council, which are drafted by the government rather than by the sovereign, are forms of either primary or secondary legislation, depending on the power they are made under. Orders made under prerogative powers, such as the power to grant royal assent to legislation, are a form of primary legislation, while orders made under statutory powers are a form of secondary legislation.

Orders of Council, distinct from Orders in Council, are issued by members of the Privy Council without requiring the approval of the sovereign. Like Orders in Council, they can be made under statutory powers or royal prerogative. Orders of Council are most commonly used for the regulation of public institutions and regulatory bodies.

The sovereign also grants royal charters on the advice of the Privy Council. Charters bestow special status to incorporated bodies; they are used to grant chartered status to certain professional, educational or charitable bodies, and sometimes also city and borough status to towns. The Privy Council therefore deals with a wide range of matters, which also includes university and livery company statutes, churchyards, coinage and the dates of bank holidays. The Privy Council formerly had sole power to grant academic degree-awarding powers and the title of university, but following the Higher Education and Research Act 2017 these powers have been transferred to the Office for Students for educational institutions in England.

=== Notable orders ===
Before the Constitutional Reform and Governance Act 2010 the UK Civil Service was governed and managed using powers within the royal prerogative. These powers were usually delegated to ministers by Orders in Council. Using these powers, Margaret Thatcher controversially determined to ban GCHQ staff from joining trade unions.

In another case dealing with civil service, the Civil Service (Amendment) Order in Council 1997 permitted the Prime Minister to grant up to three political or 'special advisers' management authority over some civil servants.

In the 1960s, the Privy Council made an order to evict an estimated 1,200 to 2,000 inhabitants of the 55-island Chagos Archipelago in the Indian Ocean, in preparation for the establishment of a joint United States–United Kingdom military base on the largest island in the archipelago, Diego Garcia.

In 2000, the High Court of Justice ruled that the inhabitants had a right to return to the archipelago.

In 2004, the Privy Council passed an Order-in-Council under the Royal Prerogative to block the return of the Chaggosians to Diego Garcia.

In 2006, the High Court of Justice found the Privy Council's Order to be unlawful. Justice Kentridge stated that there was no known precedent "for the lawful use of prerogative powers to remove or exclude an entire population of British subjects from their homes and place of birth",. The Court of Appeal upheld that decision when it was appealed to them.

However, in 2007 the Law Lords of the Appellate Committee of the House of Lords, themselves also sworn of, and members of the Judicial Committee of the Privy Council, found the first instance decision to be flawed and overturned the appeal court by 3–2, thereby upholding the validity of the Order in Council.

On 22 May 2025, the Prime Minister of the United Kingdom, Keir Starmer, signed a formal agreement on the transfer of sovereignty of the Chagos Islands to Mauritius.

== Committees ==
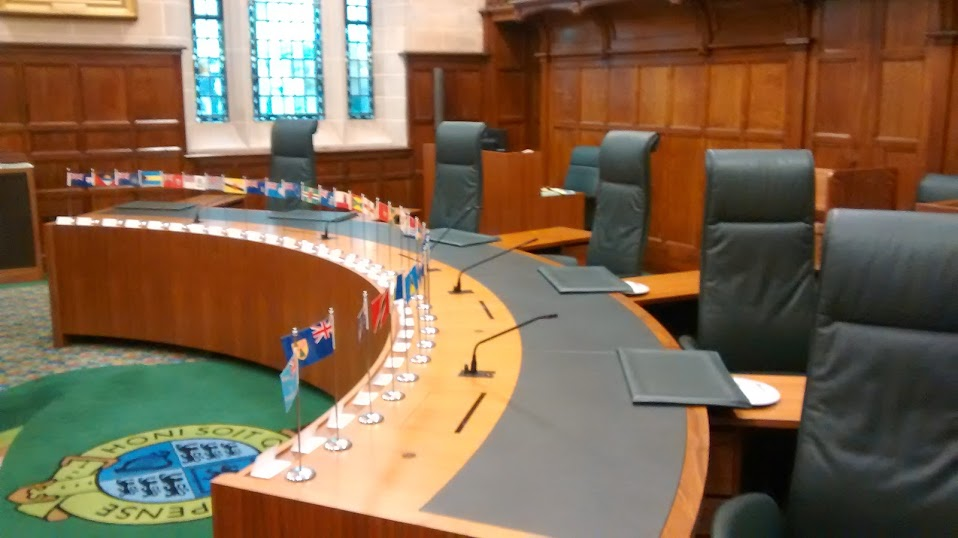
Judicial Committee of the Privy Council

The Privy Council have the following committees:

=== Baronetage Committee ===
The Baronetage Committee was established by a 1910 Order in Council, during Edward VII's reign, to scrutinise all succession claims (and thus reject doubtful ones) to be placed on the Roll of Baronets.

=== Committee for the Affairs of Jersey and Guernsey ===
The Committee for the Affairs of Jersey and Guernsey recommends approval of Channel Islands legislation.

=== Committee for the Purposes of the Crown Office Act 1877 ===
The Committee for the purposes of the Crown Office Act 1877 consists of the Lord Chancellor and Lord Privy Seal as well as a secretary of state. The Committee, which last met in 1988, is concerned with the design and usage of wafer seals.

=== Executive Committee ===
The Cabinet of the United Kingdom is the executive committee of the Privy Council and the senior decision-making body of British Government.

=== Judicial Committee ===
The Judicial Committee serves as the final court of appeal for the Crown Dependencies, the British Overseas Territories, some Commonwealth countries, military sovereign base areas and a few institutions in the United Kingdom. This committee usually consists of members of the Supreme Court of the United Kingdom and senior judges of the Commonwealth of Nations who are Privy Counsellors.

Within the United Kingdom, the Judicial Committee also hears very occasional appeals from a number of ancient and ecclesiastical courts. These include the Court of Admiralty of the Cinque Ports, Prize Courts, the High Court of Chivalry, the Disciplinary Committee of the Royal College of Veterinary Surgeons, appeals against schemes of the Church Commissioners, and appeals under certain Acts of Parliament (e.g., the House of Commons Disqualification Act 1975). The Judicial Committee had direct jurisdiction in cases relating to the Scotland Act 1998, the Government of Wales Act 1998 and the Northern Ireland Act 1998, but this was transferred to the new Supreme Court of the United Kingdom in 2009.

The Crown-in-Council was formerly the supreme appellate (final) court for the entire British Empire, but many Commonwealth countries have in the last half century abolished the right to such appeals. The Judicial Committee nevertheless continues to hear appeals from several Commonwealth countries, as well as from British Overseas Territories, Sovereign Base Areas and Crown Dependencies such as the Pitcairn Islands.

=== Scottish Universities Committee ===
The Scottish Universities Committee considers proposed amendments to the statutes of Scotland's four ancient universities.

=== Universities Committee ===
The Universities Committee, which last met in 1995, considers petitions against statutes made by Oxford and Cambridge universities and their colleges.

=== Board of Trade ===
The Board of Trade, (formally "The Lords of the Committee of the Privy Council appointed for the consideration of all matters relating to Trade and Foreign Plantations") is responsible for foreign trade and was historically used to manage the Crown colonies. As of 2020 it has only one member (the President of the Board of Trade).

=== Other committees ===
In addition to the standing committees, ad hoc committees are notionally set up to consider and report on petitions for royal charters of Incorporation and to approve changes to the bye-laws of bodies created by royal charter.

Committees of privy counsellors are occasionally established to examine specific issues. Such committees are independent of the Privy Council Office and therefore do not report directly to the lord president of the council. Examples of such committees include:

- the Butler Committee – operation of the intelligence services in the runup to military intervention in Iraq;
- the Chilcot Committee – for the Chilcot Inquiry on the use of intercept materials; and
- the Gibson Committee of enquiry set up in 2010 – to consider whether the UK security services were complicit in torture of detainees.

=== Former committees ===
Historical, but now defunct committees include:

- Lord President's Committee
- Court of Star Chamber

== Membership ==
=== Composition ===
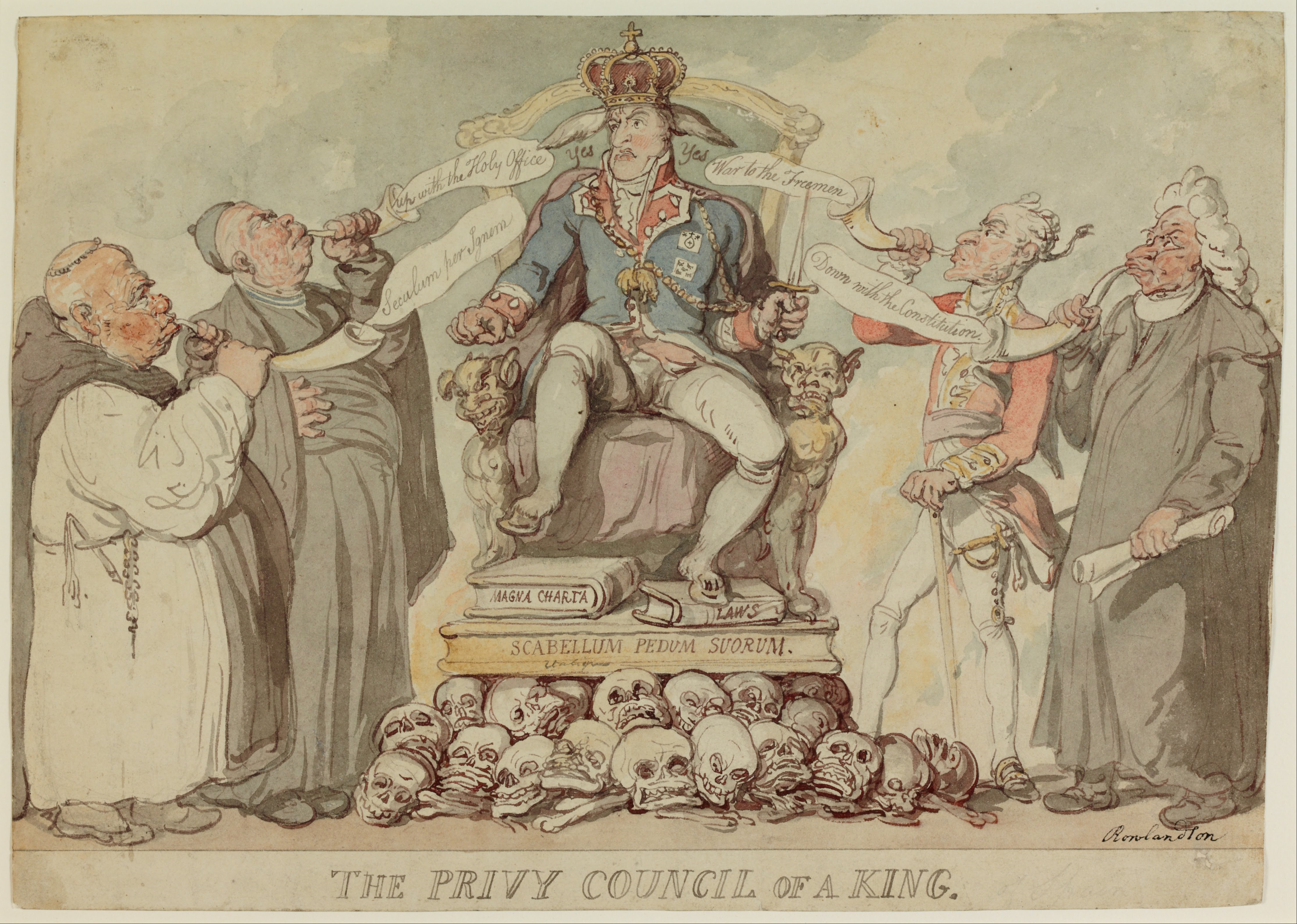
Caricature by Thomas Rowlandson titled Privy Council of a King (1815); enthroned is George IV, then Prince Regent.

The Sovereign, when acting on the Council's advice, is known as the King-in-Council or Queen-in-Council, depending on the sex of the reigning monarch. The members of the Council are collectively known as The Lords of His Majesty's Most Honourable Privy Council (sometimes The Lords and others of ...). The chief officer of the body is the Lord President of the Council, who is the fourth-highest Great Officer of State, a Cabinet member and normally, either the Leader of the House of Lords or of the House of Commons. Another important official is the Clerk, whose signature is appended to all orders made in the Council.

Both Privy Counsellor and Privy Councillor may correctly be used to refer to a member of the Council. The former, however, is preferred by the Privy Council Office, emphasising English usage of the term Counsellor as "one who gives counsel", as opposed to "one who is a member of a council". A Privy Counsellor is traditionally said to be "sworn of" the Council after being received by the sovereign.

The sovereign may appoint any person as a Privy Counsellor, but in practice, appointments are made only on the advice of His Majesty's Government. The majority of appointees are senior politicians, including ministers of the Crown, the leader of the main opposition party, the leader of the third-largest party in the House of Commons, the heads of the devolved governments, and senior politicians from Commonwealth countries. Besides these, the Council includes a small number of members of the Royal Family, some senior British and Commonwealth judges, some senior clergy, and a small number of senior civil servants.

There is no statutory limit to the membership of the Privy Council. Members have no automatic right to attend all Privy Council meetings, and only some are summoned regularly to meetings (in practice at the Prime Minister's discretion).

The Church of England's three senior bishops – the Archbishop of Canterbury, the Archbishop of York and the Bishop of London – become privy counsellors upon appointment. Senior members of the Royal Family may also be appointed, but this is confined to the Monarch's consort, heir apparent, and heir apparent's spouse. The Private Secretary to the Sovereign is always appointed a Privy Counsellor, as are the Lord Chamberlain, the Speaker of the House of Commons, and the Lord Speaker. Justices of the Supreme Court of the United Kingdom, judges of the Court of Appeal of England and Wales, senior judges of the Inner House of the Court of Session (Scotland's highest law court) and the Lord Chief Justice of Northern Ireland also join the Privy Council ex officio.

The balance of Privy Counsellors is largely made up of politicians. The Prime Minister, Cabinet ministers and the Leader of HM Opposition are traditionally sworn into the Privy Council upon appointment. Leaders of major parties in the House of Commons, first ministers of the devolved governments of Northern Ireland, Scotland and Wales, some senior ministers outside Cabinet, and on occasion other respected senior parliamentarians are appointed privy counsellors.

Because Privy Counsellors are bound by oath to keep matters discussed at Council meetings secret, the appointment of the leaders of opposition parties as privy counsellors allows the Government to share confidential information with them "on Privy Council terms". This usually only happens in special circumstances, such as in matters of national security. For example, Tony Blair met Iain Duncan Smith (then Leader of HM Opposition) and Charles Kennedy (then Leader of the Liberal Democrats) "on Privy Council terms" to discuss the evidence for Iraq's weapons of mass destruction.

==== Members from other Commonwealth realms ====
Although the Privy Council is primarily a British institution, officials from some other Commonwealth realms are also appointed. By 2000, the most notable instance was New Zealand, whose prime minister, senior politicians, chief justice and Court of Appeal justices were traditionally appointed privy counsellors. However, appointments of New Zealand members have since been discontinued. The prime minister, the speaker, the governor-general and the chief justice are still accorded the style Right Honourable, but without membership of the Council. Until the late 20th century, the prime ministers and chief justices of Canada and Australia were also appointed privy counsellors. Canada also has its own Privy Council, the King's Privy Council for Canada (see below). Prime ministers of some other Commonwealth countries that retain the King as their sovereign continue to be sworn of the Council.

=== Meetings ===
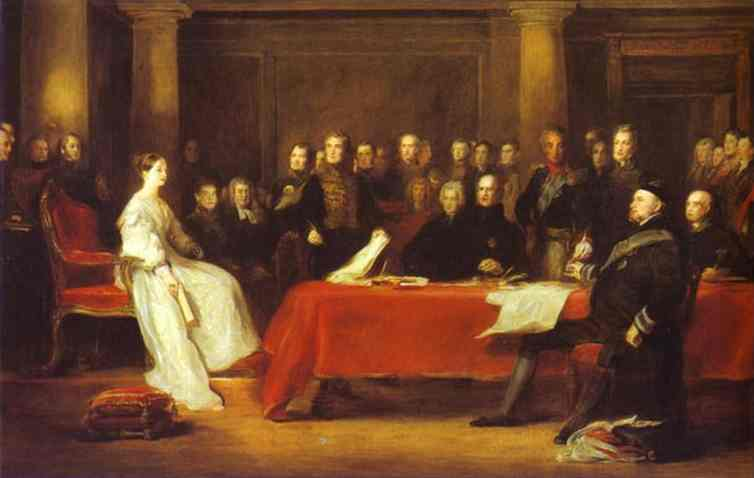
Queen Victoria convened her first Privy Council on the day of her accession in 1837.

Meetings of the Privy Council are normally held once each month wherever the Sovereign may be in residence at the time. The quorum, according to the Privy Council Office, is three, though some statutes provide for other quorums (for example, section 35 of the Opticians Act 1989 provides for a lower quorum of two).

The Sovereign attends the meeting, though their place may be taken by two or more Counsellors of State. Under the Regency Acts 1937 to 1953 and the Counsellors of State Act 2022, Counsellors of State may be chosen from among the sovereign's spouse, the four individuals next in the line of succession who are over 21 years of age (18 for the first in line), Prince Edward and Princess Anne. Customarily the sovereign remains standing at meetings of the Privy Council, so that no other members may sit down, thereby keeping meetings short. The Lord President reads out a list of orders to be made, and the sovereign merely says "Approved".

Few Privy Counsellors are required to attend regularly. The settled practice is that day-to-day meetings of the Council are attended by four Privy Counsellors, usually the relevant minister to the matter(s) pertaining. The Cabinet Minister holding the office of Lord President of the Council invariably presides. Under Britain's modern conventions of parliamentary government and constitutional monarchy, every Order-in-Council is drafted by a government department and has already been approved by the minister responsible – thus actions taken by the King-in-Council are formalities required for validation of each measure.

Full meetings of the Privy Council are held only when the reigning Sovereign announces their own engagement (which last happened on 23 November 1839, in the reign of Queen Victoria); or when there is a Demise of the Crown, either by the death or abdication of the Monarch. A full meeting of the Privy Council was also held on 6 February 1811, when the Prince of Wales was sworn in as regent by Act of Parliament. The statutes regulating the establishment of a regency in the case of minority or incapacity of the sovereign also require any regents to swear their oaths before the Privy Council.

In the case of a Demise of the Crown, the Privy Council – together with the Lords Spiritual, the Lords Temporal, the Lord Mayor of the City of London and Court of Aldermen of the City of London as well as representatives of Commonwealth realms – makes a proclamation declaring the accession of the new Sovereign and receives an oath from the new Monarch relating to the security of the Church of Scotland, as required by law. It is also customary for the new Sovereign to make an allocution to the Privy Council on that occasion, and this Sovereign's Speech is formally published in The London Gazette. Any such Special Assembly of the Privy Council, convened to proclaim the accession of a new Sovereign and witness the Monarch's statutory oath, is known as an Accession Council. The last such meeting was held on 10 September 2022 following the death of Elizabeth II and the accession of Charles III.

=== Term of office ===
Membership is conferred for life. Formerly, the death of a monarch ("demise of the Crown") brought an immediate dissolution of the council, as all Crown appointments automatically lapsed. By the 18th century, it was enacted that the council would not be dissolved until up to six months after the demise of the Crown. (Note: The most recent enactment deferring dissolution was the Succession to the Crown Act 1707 (6 Ann. c. 41). Section VIII provided, "... the Privy Council of Her Majesty, her heirs or successors for the Kingdom of Great Britain, shall not be determined or dissolved by the death or demise of Her Majesty, her heirs or successors; but such Privy Council shall continue and act as such by the space of six months next after such demise, unless sooner determined by the next successor to whom the imperial Crown of this realm is limited and appointed to go, remain, and descend; ..." Despite becoming obsolete in 1901, this section remained on the statute book until it was repealed by the Statute Law (Repeals) Act 1973 (c. 39), section 1(1) and Schedule 1 part I.) By convention, however, the sovereign would reappoint all members of the council after its dissolution. In practice, therefore, membership continued without a break. In 1901, the law was changed to ensure that Crown appointments became wholly unaffected by any succession of monarch.

The sovereign, however, may remove an individual from the Privy Council. Former MP Elliot Morley was expelled on 8 June 2011, following his conviction on charges of false accounting in connection with the British parliamentary expenses scandal. Before this, the last individual to be expelled from the Council was Sir Edgar Speyer, Bt., who was removed on 13 December 1921 for collaborating with the enemy German Empire, during the First World War. Following the significant revelations regarding a long-standing association with the American financier and sex offender Jeffrey Epstein and the subsequent announcement of a police investigation by the Metropolitan Police into their communications, The Lord Mandelson was expelled from the Privy council on 10 March 2026. On 8 July 2026 Craig Williams was removed as member after pleading guilty in a recent court case.

Individuals can choose to resign, sometimes to avoid expulsion. Three members voluntarily left the Privy Council in the 20th century: John Profumo, who resigned on 26 June 1963; John Stonehouse, who resigned on 17 August 1976 and Jonathan Aitken, who resigned in 1997 following allegations of perjury.

So far, five Privy Counsellors have resigned in the 21st century, three in the same year. On 4 February 2013, Chris Huhne announced that he would voluntarily leave the Privy Council after pleading guilty to perverting the course of justice. Lord Prescott stood down on 6 July 2013, in protest against delays in the introduction of press regulation, expecting others to follow. Denis MacShane resigned on 9 October 2013, before an Old Bailey hearing at which he pleaded guilty of false accounting and was subsequently imprisoned. In April 2022, former Prime Minister of Jamaica P. J. Patterson resigned to make the case for Jamaica to become a republic. Jeffrey Donaldson tendered his resignation from the Privy Council on 24 June after being convicted of 18 counts of sex abuse. His removal was approved by The King on 8 July 2026.

=== Rights and privileges ===
The Privy Council as a whole is termed "The Most Honourable" whilst its members individually, the Privy Counsellors, are entitled to be styled "The Right Honourable". Nonetheless, some nobles automatically have higher styles: non-royal Dukes are styled "His Grace" and "The Most Noble", and Marquesses as "The Most Honourable". Modern custom as recommended by Debrett's is to use the post-nominal letters "PC" in a social style of address for peers who are Privy Counsellors. For commoners, "The Right Honourable" is sufficient identification of their status as a Privy Counsellor and they do not use the post-nominal letters "PC". The Ministry of Justice revises the practice of this convention from time to time.

Each Privy Counsellor has the right of personal access to the sovereign. Peers were considered to enjoy this right individually; members of the House of Commons possess the right collectively. In each case, personal access may only be used to tender advice on public affairs.

Only Privy Counsellors can signify Royal Consent to the examination of a Bill affecting the rights of the Crown.

Privy Counsellors have the right to sit on the steps of the Sovereign's Throne in the Chamber of the House of Lords during debates, a privilege which was shared with heirs apparent of those hereditary peers who were to become members of the House of Lords before Labour's partial Reform of the Lords in 1999, diocesan bishops of the Church of England yet to be Lords Spiritual, retired bishops who formerly sat in the House of Lords, the Dean of Westminster, Peers of Ireland, the Clerk of the Crown in Chancery, and the Gentleman Usher of the Black Rod. While Privy Counsellors have the right to sit on the steps of the Sovereign's Throne they do so only as observers and are not allowed to participate in any of the workings of the House of Lords. Nowadays this privilege is rarely exercised. A notable recent instance of the exercising of this privilege was used by the Prime Minister, Theresa May, and David Lidington, who watched the opening of the debate of the European Union (Notification of Withdrawal) Bill 2017 in the House of Lords.

Privy Counsellors are accorded a formal rank of precedence, if not already having a higher one. At the beginning of each new Parliament, and at the discretion of the Speaker, those members of the House of Commons who are Privy Counsellors usually take the oath of allegiance before all other members except the Speaker and the Father of the House (who is the member of the House who has the longest continuous service). Should a Privy Counsellor rise to speak in the House of Commons at the same time as another Honourable Member, the Speaker usually gives priority to the "Right Honourable" Member. This parliamentary custom, however, was discouraged under New Labour after 1998, despite the government not being supposed to exert influence over the Speaker.

=== Oath and initiation rite ===
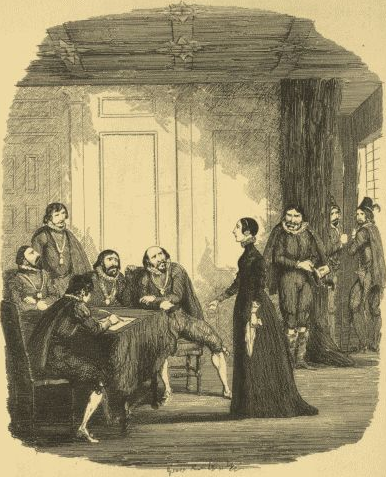
Viviana Radcliffe examined by the Earl of Salisbury and the Privy Council in the Star Chamber. Illustration by George Cruikshank from William Harrison Ainsworth's novel Guy Fawkes.

The oath of the king's council (later the Privy Council) was first formulated in the early thirteenth century. This oath went through a series of revisions, but the modern form of the oath was essentially settled in 1571. It was regarded by some members of the Privy Council as criminal, and possibly treasonous, to disclose the oath administered to privy counsellors as they take office. However, the oath was officially made public by the Blair Government in a written parliamentary answer in 1998, as follows. It had also previously been read out in full in the House of Lords during debate by Lord Rankeillour on 21 December 1932, and has been openly printed in full in widely published books during the 19th and 20th centuries.

You do swear by Almighty God to be a true and faithful Servant unto the King's Majesty, as one of His Majesty's Privy Council. You will not know or understand of any manner of thing to be attempted, done, or spoken against His Majesty's Person, Honour, Crown, or Dignity Royal, but you will lett and withstand the same to the uttermost of your Power, and either cause it to be revealed to His Majesty Himself, or to such of His Privy Council as shall advertise His Majesty of the same. You will, in all things to be moved, treated, and debated in Council, faithfully and truly declare your Mind and Opinion, according to your Heart and Conscience; and will keep secret all Matters committed and revealed unto you, or that shall be treated of secretly in Council. And if any of the said Treaties or Counsels shall touch any of the Counsellors, you will not reveal it unto him, but will keep the same until such time as, by the Consent of His Majesty, or of the Council, Publication shall be made thereof. You will to your uttermost bear Faith and Allegiance unto the King's Majesty; and will assist and defend all Jurisdictions, Pre-eminences, and Authorities, granted to His Majesty, and annexed to the Crown by Acts of Parliament, or otherwise, against all Foreign Princes, Persons, Prelates, States, or Potentates. And generally in all things you will do as a faithful and true Servant ought to do to His Majesty. So help you God.

Privy counsellors can choose to affirm their allegiance in similar terms, should they prefer not to take a religious oath. At the induction ceremony, the order of precedence places Anglicans (being those of the established church) before others.

The initiation ceremony for newly appointed privy counsellors is held in private, and typically requires kneeling on a stool before the Sovereign and then kissing hands. According to The Royal Encyclopaedia: "The new Privy Counsellor or Minister will extend his or her right hand, palm upwards, and, taking the Queen's hand lightly, will kiss it with no more than a touch of the lips." The ceremony has caused difficulties for Privy Counsellors who advocate republicanism; Tony Benn said in his diaries that he kissed his own thumb, rather than the Queen's hand, while Jeremy Corbyn reportedly did not kneel. Not all members of the Privy Council go through the initiation ceremony; appointments are frequently made by an Order in Council, although it is "rare for a party leader to use such a course."

== Other councils ==
The Privy Council is one of the four principal councils of the sovereign. The other three are the courts of law, the Commune Concilium (Common Council, i.e. Parliament) and the Magnum Concilium (Great Council, i.e. the assembly of all the peers of the realm). All are still in existence, or at least have never been formally abolished, but the Magnum Concilium has not been summoned since 1640 and was considered defunct even then.

Several other privy councils have advised the sovereign. England and Scotland once had separate privy councils (the Privy Council of England and Privy Council of Scotland). The Acts of Union 1707 united the two countries into the Kingdom of Great Britain and in 1708 the Parliament of Great Britain abolished the Privy Council of Scotland and the Privy Council of England. Thereafter there was one Privy Council of Great Britain sitting in London. Ireland, on the other hand, continued to have a separate Privy Council even after the Act of Union 1800. The last appointments to the Privy Council of Ireland were made in 1922, when the greater part of Ireland separated from the United Kingdom as an independent Dominion. It was succeeded by the Privy Council of Northern Ireland, which became dormant after the suspension of the Parliament of Northern Ireland in 1972.

Canada has had its own Privy Council — the King's Privy Council for Canada — since 1867. While the Canadian Privy Council is specifically "for Canada", the Privy Council discussed above is not "for the United Kingdom"; to clarify the ambiguity where necessary, the latter was historically referred to as the Imperial Privy Council. Equivalent organs of state in other Commonwealth realms, such as Australia and New Zealand, are called Executive Councils.

== See also ==
- List of Royal members of the Privy Council
- List of current Privy Counsellors
- List of Privy Council orders
- Clerk to the Privy Council
- Court uniform and dress in the United Kingdom
- Historic list of Privy Counsellors
- Minister of State for the Privy Council Office

== Bibliography ==
- Blackstone, W. (1838). Commentaries on the Laws of England. New York: W.E. Dean.
- Brazier, R. (1997). Ministers of the Crown. Oxford University Press. ISBN 0-19-825988-3.
- Cox, H (1854). The British Commonwealth, Or, A Commentary on the Institutions and Principles of British Government. London: Longman, Brown, Green, and Longmans. p. 389. "privy council reappointed demise."
- Cox, N. (2002). "The Abolition or Retention of the Privy Council as the Final Court of Appeal for New Zealand: Conflict Between National Identity and Legal Pragmatism". New Zealand Universities Law Review. 20. doi:10.2139/ssrn.420373. S2CID 150529602.
- —— (2008). "Peerage Privileges since the House of Lords Act 1999". Selected Works of Noel Cox. Berkeley Electronic Press. Archived from the original on 2 March 2009.
- Dicey, A. (1887). The Privy Council: the Arnold prize essay, 1860. London: Macmillan.
- Elton, Geoffrey Rudolph (1953). The Tudor Revolution in Government: Administrative Changes in the Reign of Henry VIII. Cambridge University Press. doi:10.1017/CBO9780511561115. ISBN 9780511561115.
- Gay, O.; Rees, Aa. (2005). "The Privy Council" (PDF). House of Commons Library Standard Note. SN/PC/2708. Archived from the original (PDF) on 15 June 2010.
- Goodnow, F. (1897). Comparative Administrative Law: an Analysis of the Administrative Systems, National and Local, of the United States, England, France and Germany. New York: G.P. Putnam's Sons. ISBN 978-1-58477-622-2.
- Hayter, P. (2007). Companion to the Standing Orders and guide to the Proceedings of the House of Lords (21st ed.). Archived from the original on 19 November 2008.
- Iwi, E. (1937). "A Plea for an Imperial Privy Council and Judicial Committee". Transactions of the Grotius Society. 23. Transactions of the Grotius Society, Vol. 23: 127–146. JSTOR 742946.
- Maitland, F. (1911). The constitutional history of England: a course of lectures. Cambridge: Cambridge University Press.
- Pulman, Michael (1971). The Elizabethan Privy Council in the Fifteen Seventies. University of California Press.
- Rogers, David (2015). By Royal Appointment : Tales from the Privy Council—the unknown arm of Government. London: Biteback Publishing.
- Torrance, David (2023). The Privy Council: history, functions and membership. London: House of Commons Library.
- Warshaw, S. (1996). Powersharing: White House—Cabinet relations in the modern presidency. Albany, N.Y.: State University of New York Press. ISBN 0-7914-2869-9.
