= Complex contagion =

Social networking phenomenon

Complex contagion is the phenomenon in social networks in which multiple sources of exposure to an innovation are required before an individual adopts the change of behavior. It differs from simple contagion in that unlike a disease, it may not be possible for the innovation to spread after only one incident of contact with an infected neighbor. The spread of complex contagion across a network of people may depend on many social and economic factors; for instance, how many of one's friends adopt the new idea as well as how many of them cannot influence the individual, as well as their own disposition in embracing change.

== Mechanisms ==
Complex Contagion and the Weakness of Long Ties by Damon Centola of University of Pennsylvania and Michael Macy of Cornell University found that information and disease spread as “simple contagions”, requiring only one contact for transmission, while behaviors typically spread as “complex contagions”, requiring multiples sources of reinforcement to induce adoption. Centola’s work builds on Granovetter’s work on the strength of weak ties and threshold models of collective behavior, as well as Duncan Watts and Steve Strogatz’s work on small world networks. Centola and Macy show that the weak ties and small worlds networks are both very good for spreading simple contagions. However, for complex contagions, weak ties and small worlds can slow diffusion.

Centola and Macy suggest four mechanisms of complex contagion. These properties explain the need for multiple exposures in the spread of contagion:

1. Coordination. Certain innovations become attractive only when people collectively adopt them. In his book "Change," Centola discusses that social technologies like popular media-sharing platforms such as Twitter and Facebook only become valuable once a critical mass of individuals within your social network begins to use them. Many innovations are costly, especially for early adopters but less so for those who wait. The same holds for participation in collective action.
2. Credibility. Innovations often lack credibility until adopted by neighbors. Hearing the same story from different people makes it seem less likely that surprising information is nothing more than the fanciful invention of the informant.
3. Legitimacy. Knowing that a movement exists or that a collective action will take place is rarely sufficient to induce bystanders to join in. Having several close friends participate in an event often greatly increases an individual’s likelihood of also joining, especially for high-risk social movements. Innovators risk being shunned as deviants until there is a critical mass of early adopters, and non-adopters are likely to challenge the legitimacy of the innovation.
4. Emotional contagion. Most theoretical models of collective behavior – from action theory to threshold models to cybernetics share the basic assumption that there are expressive and symbolic impulses in human behavior that can be communicated and amplified in spatially and socially concentrated gatherings.

== Contested vs. uncontested ==
Uncontested
The spread of the contagion is dependent solely on the number of people you are connected to who are different from your own state. You are not hindered whatsoever by the number of people in the same state as you. Generally, the more neighbors an individual has, the greater the chance of the individual adopting the innovation if the spread is uncontested.

Contested
The spread of the contagion is dependent on both the adamancy of those who are in a different state from your own as well as the countervailing influence of those who share your current state. In this case, the more neighbors an individual has, the smaller the chance of the individual adopting the innovation.

== Diffusion and cascading behaviors in networks ==
Consider a graph of any reasonable size. Node v’s neighbors can be split into two sets: Set A contains v's neighbors who have adopted a new behavior and B is the set of those behaving conservatively. Node v will only adopt the behavior of those in A if at least a q fraction of neighbors follow behavior A.

- if q is small, the behavior is easily adopted and easily spread
- if q is large, B is an attractive behavior and it takes more friends to engage in A before v will switch.

Cascading – diffusion over the entire network
Consider a set of initial adopters who start with a new behavior A, while every other node starts with behavior B. Nodes then repeatedly evaluate the decision to switch from B to A using a threshold of q. If the resulting cascade of adoptions of A eventually causes every node to switch from B to A, then we say that the set of initial adopters causes a complete cascade at threshold q. Clusters of density d > 1 − q are obstacles to cascades across the entire network.

== Application and examples ==
Many interactions happen at a local, rather than a global, level – we often don't care as much about the full population's decisions as about the decisions made by friends and colleagues. For example, in a work setting we may choose technology to be compatible with the people we directly collaborate with, rather than the universally most popular technology. Similarly, we may adopt political views that are aligned with those of our friends, even if they belong to minorities.

=== Examples ===
- The credibility of an urban legend
- Willingness to participate in migration – (participating in a collective action)
- Incentives to exit formal gatherings
- Lifestyle trends: What clothing to wear, hairstyle to adopt, and what part of the body to pierce.
- The adoption of political hashtags on Twitter.

=== Examples of simple contagion ===
- The spread of disease
- Spread of information

== See also ==
- Emotional contagion
- Mark Granovetter
- Graph theory
- Rumor spread in social network
- Social contagion
