= Tough on crime, tough on the causes of crime =

British Labour party slogan from 1998

- Originator: Alun Michael
- First popularized: 1993 (Tony Blair's Labour Party Conference speech)
- Associated with: New Labour, Tony Blair
- Country: United Kingdom
- Context: British politics, criminal justice reform
- Notable legislation: Crime and Disorder Act 1998

"Tough on crime, tough on the causes of crime" is a British political slogan most strongly associated with New Labour. It was used in a September 1993 speech by Shadow Home Secretary and future party leader Tony Blair to the Labour party conference, and was seen as an attempt at triangulation, with Labour using the slogan to attack the "tough on crime" approach traditionally favoured by the Conservative Party. An example of this approach was the introduction of anti-social behaviour orders (ASBOs) in the Crime and Disorder Act 1998.

The slogan has seen continued use by Labour beyond the New Labour era. Ed Miliband said the slogan remained Labour policy under his leadership, and Keir Starmer has also promoted the slogan as representing Labour's intended approach to crime.

== History ==
The slogan "tough on crime, tough on the causes of crime" was coined in 1992 by Alun Michael, Tony Blair's deputy as shadow home secretary during the Labour leadership of John Smith. Though it later came to be associated with Blair, he was initially uninterested with the slogan, opting not to use it in most of his speeches. According to Michael, the concept behind the slogan was to combine a tough, law and order approach on crime with a more preventive focus on crime and reoffending by tackling social issues which are known to cause crime, such as poverty, homelessness and unemployment. Blair first used the slogan publicly in an interview in January 1993.
