= Damon Centola =

Researcher in network science and related at the University of Pennsylvania

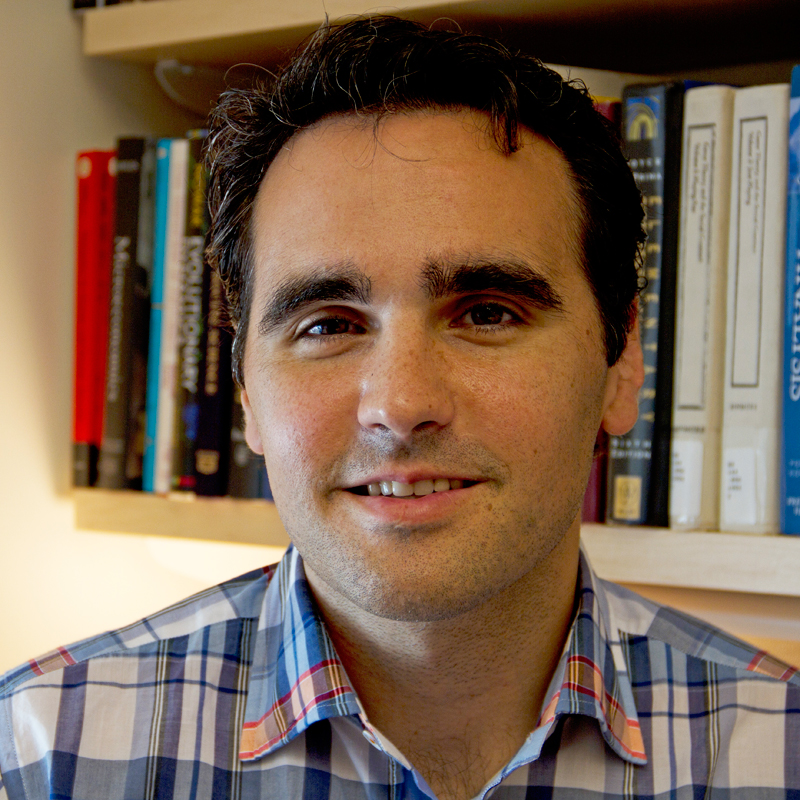
- Damon Centola
- Born: July 19, 1973 (age 53); Philadelphia, Pennsylvania, U.S.
- Known for: Complex contagions, collective intelligence, experimental sociology

Academic background
- Education: Cornell University (Ph.D.) (M.A.), Tufts University (M.A.), Marlboro College (B.A.)
- Thesis: Elementary Forms of Collective Dynamics (2006)
- Doctoral advisor: Michael Macy

Academic work
- Discipline: Sociology
- Sub-discipline: Agent-based modeling, web-based experiments (Internet experiments), complex contagions, social networks, social epidemiology
- Institutions: University of Pennsylvania, MIT, Harvard University, Stanford University
- Website: ndg.asc.upenn.edu

Damon Centola is an American sociologist and the Elihu Katz Professor of Communication, Sociology and Engineering at the University of Pennsylvania, where he is Director of the Network Dynamics Group and Senior Fellow at the Leonard Davis Institute of Health Economics.

His research focuses on social networks, collective intelligence, behavior change, and complex contagions. He is the author of How Behavior Spreads: The Science of Complex Contagions (2018), Change: How to Make Big Things Happen (2021), and Goodthink: The New Science of Collective Intelligence (2026). In 2026, he was named a Guggenheim Fellow in Sociology.

Before joining the University of Pennsylvania, Centola was an assistant professor at MIT Sloan School of Management (2008–2013) and a Robert Wood Johnson Fellow at Harvard University.

== Early life and education ==
Centola grew up in a Quaker community in the United States. He earned a bachelor's degree from Marlboro College before studying philosophy under Daniel Dennett at Tufts University. Prior to entering graduate school, he was a Visiting Scholar at the Brookings Institution.

Centola later entered the Sociology Ph.D. program at Cornell University, where he studied under sociologist Michael Macy and was a Fellow in Cornell's National Science Foundation-funded Integrative Graduate Education and Research Traineeship (IGERT) program in Computational Social Science, led by Steven Strogatz. During his first year of graduate school, he co-authored The Emperor's Dilemma: A Computational Model of Self-Enforcing Norms with Michael Macy and Robb Willer. During his graduate studies, Centola was an Exchange Fellow at Columbia University, where he studied with sociologist Peter Bearman.

== Career ==
Centola works on complex contagions, collective intelligence, and experimental sociology. Complex contagions was the topic of his Ph.D. dissertation in sociology, supervised by Michael Macy at Cornell University. After completing his doctorate degree at Cornell, Damon spent two years as a Robert Wood Johnson Postdoctoral Fellow in Health Policy at Harvard University. He then joined the faculty of the Sloan School of Management at MIT in 2008. In 2013, he moved to the University of Pennsylvania's Annenberg School for Communications and founded the Network Dynamics Group as a center for theoretical research with testable policy applications.

== Complex contagions ==
Centola and Macy found that information and disease spread as "simple contagions", requiring only one contact for transmission, while behaviors typically spread as "complex contagions", requiring multiple sources of reinforcement to induce adoption. Centola's work builds on Granovetter's work on the strength of weak ties and threshold models of collective behavior, as well as Duncan Watts and Steve Strogatz's work on small world networks. Centola and Macy show that the weak ties and small worlds networks are both very good for spreading simple contagions. However, for complex contagions, weak ties and small worlds can slow diffusion. Centola used a network-based experimental method to test the theory of complex contagions and showed that predictions were confirmed.

Centola's work on complex contagions also explores the importance of peer homophily and structural diversity in the process of spreading behaviors.

== Experimental sociology ==
Centola pioneered the use of large scale online networks as an experimental tool for identifying the dynamics of social change. To test the theory of complex contagions, Centola developed the method of "Internet Network Experiments", in which he constructed social networks within proprietary online communities to study how an innovation would propagate.

Centola's first experimental sociology study conducted at Harvard University in 2010, called "The Healthy Lifestyle Network", constructed 12 independent online communities. This experiment showed that experimentally controlled variations in the structure of a network could control how far and how fast an innovation would spread. This was the first study to demonstrate the causal effects of network structure on the spread of behavior.

In 2011, Centola showed that the same method could be used to causally identify the effects of network homophily on the spread of health innovations.

In 2015, he showed that this method could also be used to identify the causal effects of network structure in controlling the spontaneous emergence of new social norms.

In a series of subsequent studies, he showed that the same method could be used to identify the causal effects of social networks on the creation of collective intelligence, the emergence of political polarization, and the identification of an exact "tipping point" for overturning an established social norm.

== Collective intelligence ==
In 2017, Centola and his graduate students Joshua Becker and Devon Brackbill found that the "wisdom of the crowd" could be improved by using communication networks and that the structure of the social network changed the intelligence of the group.

Decentralized networks, in which everyone had the same number of connections and same level of influence, consistently produced group judgements that were more accurate than the standard "wisdom of the crowd". Centralized networks did not create these improvements because they gave a central, highly connected person more influence. Because of this disproportionate influence, they found that any errors by the central person would make the entire group underperform.

In 2020, Centola and Devon Brackbill published Impact of Network Structure on Collective Learning: An Experimental Study in a Data Science Competition, which found that less efficient communication networks outperformed more efficient ones on complex problem-solving tasks by promoting greater exploration of solutions before converging on the best-performing approaches.

In 2022, Centola published The Network Science of Collective Intelligence in Trends in Cognitive Sciences, a review that synthesized advances in network science research on collective intelligence and proposed a unifying framework for understanding how communication networks shape collective problem-solving and social learning.

In subsequent studies, Centola and his graduate students Doug Guilbeault and Joshua Becker showed that the same networked collective intelligence process worked to improve group judgements, even when participants initially had strong partisan biases.

Centola expanded on this research in his 2026 book Goodthink: The New Science of Collective Intelligence (MIT Press). The book examines how the structure of social networks influences collective intelligence, showing that social influence can improve group decision-making rather than undermining independent judgment. It explores how different patterns of communication networks affect four core challenges of collective intelligence: choosing, coordination, cooperation, and creativity. Centola introduces the concept of “structural intelligence,” emphasizing that different challenges require different network structures to optimize collective performance. For example, decentralized networks can improve decision-making accuracy by distributing influence more evenly, while more centralized networks can facilitate coordination around shared goals.

== Norms and tipping points ==
In 2015, Centola and physicist Andrea Baronchelli showed that the network structure of an online community can control the ability for people to converge on a shared social norm.

Centola and his team then used the same empirical design in 2018 to test Centola's theory of critical mass. Centola's theory predicted and showed that 25% of people need to adopt a new social norm to create an inflection point where everyone in the group follows. Results showed that by getting above the 25% tipping point, a committed minority can have rapid success in changing an entire population's opinion.

In 2025, Centola and Douglas Guilbeault extended this line of research to online content moderation in Structural Synchronization in Classification of Controversial Content. The study found that structurally similar communication networks independently synchronized on decisions about the classification and removal of controversial content, reducing partisan differences in moderation judgments and improving participants' experiences compared with individuals making decisions alone.

Centola's work on tipping points has been cited in discussions of social movements, including analyses of the #MeToo movement and the role of committed minorities in social change.

== Technologies ==
While affiliated with Tufts University, Centola contributed to the development of the NetLogo agent-based modeling environment.

During his fellowship at Harvard University, Centola and Nicholas Christakis developed a network-based method for designing online social networks to promote the diffusion of desired behaviors. Their invention, Method and Apparatus for Influencing the Spread of Behavior in Online Social Networks, was the subject of a United States patent.

== Awards ==
Damon Centola received the American Sociological Association's (ASA) 2017 James Coleman Award for Outstanding Article by the Rationality and Society Section, and the 2018 Best Paper Award at the International Conference on Computational Social Science.

He received The American Sociological Association's (ASA) Award for Outstanding Article in Mathematical Sociology in 2006, 2009, and 2011, and was awarded the ASA's 2011 Goodman Prize for Outstanding Contributions to Sociological Methodology.

In 2019, he received the Harrison White Outstanding Scholarly Book Award for How Behavior Spreads: The Science of Complex Contagions.

In 2025, he received the Best Paper Award from the Journal of Social Computing for his paper Structural Synchronization in Classification of Controversial Content.

In 2026, he was awarded a Guggenheim Fellowship.

== Books ==
Centola is the author of:

- How Behavior Spreads: The Science of Complex Contagions (Princeton University Press, 2018)
- Change: How to Make Big Things Happen (Little, Brown Spark, 2021)
- Goodthink: The New Science of Collective Intelligence (MIT Press, 2026)
