= Michael Macy =

Sociologist

Michael W. Macy is a Cornell University sociologist who is the Director of the Social Dynamics Laboratory and Distinguished Professor of Arts and Sciences in Sociology.

== Biography ==
Macy was born in 1948 in Clarksville, Tennessee.

He attended Harvard University for his B.A. and Ph.D. and his M.A. was from Stanford University. He was a fellow at the N.I.A.S. (Netherlands Institute for Advanced Study) from February to June 2002 and at Stanford's Center for Advanced Study in the Behavioral Sciences from 2011 until 2012.

== Research ==
He is known for his contributions to computational social science. Using a National Science Foundation grant, he and his team have “used computational models, online laboratory experiments, and digital traces of device-mediated interaction to explore familiar but enigmatic social patterns.” He has also focused on political polarization. He has published in Science, American Journal of Sociology and American Sociological Review.

== Ph.D. students ==
Notable students he has supervised include Damon Centola, Robb Willer, and Arnout van de Rijt.
