= Arnout van de Rijt =

Dutch researcher (born 1978)

- Born: March 29, 1978, Schiedam, Netherlands
- Occupation: Professor
- Institutions: European University Institute, Cornell University, Utrecht University
- Alma mater: Cornell University (Ph.D.) (M.Sc.), Utrecht University (M.A.), Utrecht University (B.A.)
- Doctoral advisor: Michael Macy (Sociology)
- Fields: social networks, collective action, mathematical sociology, computational social science, social stratification
- Known for: Matthew effect, social network evolution

Arnout van de Rijt (born March 29, 1978) is Professor of Sociology at the European University Institute (EUI). Van de Rijt is known for his work on the Matthew effect and social network evolution. He is editor-in-chief of the journal Sociological Science. He is president of the International Network of Analytical Sociology.

== Biography ==
Van de Rijt received a Ph.D. in Sociology from Cornell University (2007). He worked until 2016 as Assistant and Associate Professor of Sociology at Stony Brook University and until 2020 as Professor of Sociology at Utrecht University. In 2018 he was elected member of the European Academy of Sociology. He joined the Department of Political and Social Sciences at the European University Institute (EUI) in 2019. In 2010 Van de Rijt was awarded the Lynton Freeman award from the International Network for Social Network Analysis and in 2017 the Raymond Boudon prize from the European Academy of Sociology.

== Publications ==
- The marginal majority effect: when social influence produces lock-in. Science Advances, 2026, eadr4237.
- Reinforcement generates systematic differences without heterogeneity. Proceedings of the National Academy of Sciences, 2025, e2408163122.
- Social influence undermines the wisdom of the crowd in sequential decision making. Management Science, 2021, 4273-4286.
- Self-Correcting Dynamics in Social Influence Processes. American Journal of Sociology, 2019, 124(5), 1468-1495.
- The Matthew effect in science funding. Proceedings of the National Academy of Sciences, 2018, 115(19), 4887-4890.
- A paper ceiling: Explaining the persistent underrepresentation of women in printed news. American Sociological Review, 2015, 80(5), 960-984
- Field experiments of success-breeds-success dynamics. Proceedings of the National Academy of Sciences, 2014,111(19), 6934-6939.
- Only 15 minutes? The social stratification of fame in printed media. American Sociological Review, 2013. 78(2), 266-289.
- Neighborhood chance and neighborhood change: A comment on Bruch and Mare. American Journal of Sociology, 2009, 114(4), 1166-1180.
- Dynamics of networks if everyone strives for structural holes. American Journal of Sociology, 2008, 114(2), 371-407.
