= European Academy of Sociology =

The European Academy of Sociology (EAS) is an organization of European scholars in many different areas of sociology and a common concern with quality standards for sociological research and education. Currently, the Academy has 42 elected fellows (including, for instance, Melinda Mills, Diego Gambetta, and Lars-Erik Cederman) and 16 emeritus fellows (including, for instance, John Goldthorpe, Anuška Ferligoj, and Anthony Heath).

== History ==
EAS was founded in Paris in 2000 and Raymond Boudon was its first President. Subsequent Presidents were Peter Hedström, Werner Raub, Frank Kalter, and Emmanuel Lazega. The current President is Lucinda Platt.

== Mission ==
The European Academy of Sociology aims to promote and maintain quality standards for research and education in sociology that help the public, policymakers, funders, and prospective students to identify excellent research and teaching programs. To that aim, the fellows are willing to offer their services for international bodies of accreditation and evaluation.

The Academy annually awards two prizes recognizing research excellence in sociology: A prize for distinguished publications (since 2005) and the Raymond Boudon Award for Early Career Achievement (since 2016). The Raymond Boudon Award winner is invited to deliver a lecture at the Academy´s Annual Meeting, and one or more fellows and/or invited scholars deliver additional lectures. Some of these lectures were published in the European Sociological Review.

== Raymond Boudon Award winners ==
The following scholars have received the Raymond Boudon award:

- 2016: Delia Baldassarri, New York University and Bocconi University
- 2017: Arnout van de Rijt, European University Institute
- 2018: Christoph Stadtfeld, ETH Zürich
- 2019: Ozan Aksoy, University College London
- 2021: Dominik Hangartner, ETH Zürich
- 2022: Kristian Bernt Karlson, University of Copenhagen
- 2023: Yuliya Kosyakova, Institute for Employment Research (IAB) and University of Bamberg
- 2024: Milena Tsvetkova, London School of Economics and Political Science
- 2025: Daniel Auer, Collegio Carlo Alberto
