= Centre for Social Investigation =

English research group

The Centre for Social Investigation (CSI) is an interdisciplinary research group based at Nuffield College, Oxford University, in England.

The CSI is led by Professor Anthony Heath, CBE, FBA, Emeritus Professor of Sociology at Oxford University and Professor of Sociology at The University of Manchester. It was launched officially in March 2015. The Centre aims to address contemporary social issues of public interest, carrying out authoritative, research on central social issues which draws upon interdisciplinary expertise in economics, politics and sociology and related disciplines such as social policy. A particular focus is on examining social progress in Britain and to this aim, the Centre has undertaken research covering topics including crime, education, social capital, life expectancy, corruption, food insecurity and Beveridge’s ‘five giants’. The Centre also undertakes research on inequalities, including those relating to gender, ethnicity and class. The Centre has a strong emphasis on interdisciplinary work and rigorous methods, ranging from quantitative research to field experiments. It has undertaken collaborative work with the UK Department for Communities and Local Government.

CSI's research is independent and non-partisan; as such, it has no political affiliation or leaning. The Centre is counselled by an advisory board whose members work in research, policy and the private sector. Unusually for an academic research group, the Centre has a strong emphasis on engaging and disseminating its research beyond traditional academic outputs to communicate the results of its activities in an accessible way to non-technical audiences, including policy-makers and the public more generally. The Centre maintains a blog with posts from both its researchers and from guest contributors.

== See also ==
- Social policy
