= Robb Willer =

American sociologist and social psychologist

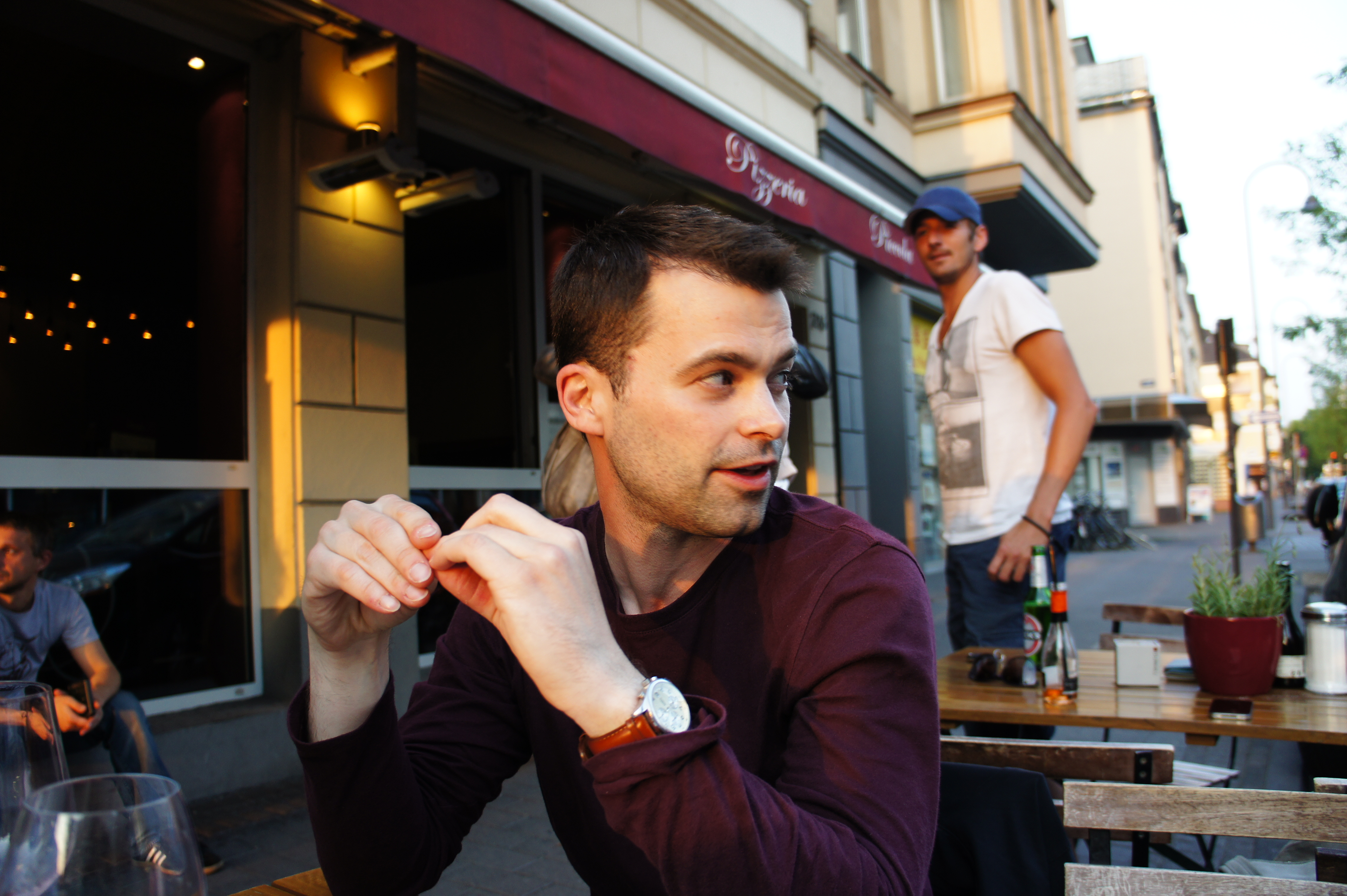
- Scientific career
- Fields: Social psychology Organizational behavior Political science Political psychology Moral psychology
- Institutions: Stanford University University of California, Berkeley
- Website: www.robbwiller.org

Robb Willer (born 1977) is an American sociologist and social psychologist whose research has examined American politics, political psychology, moral persuasion, and cooperation.

== Early life and education ==
Robb Willer grew up in Kansas and South Carolina, before earning a Bachelor of Arts in sociology from the University of Iowa and completing an M.A. and Ph.D. in sociology at Cornell University. While at Cornell, he co-led a United Auto Workers–affiliated drive to unionize graduate teaching and research assistants, but students voted against forming a union, an experience he later cited as formative to his interest in collective action and political psychology.

== Academic career ==
Willer began his career as an assistant professor of sociology at the University of California, Berkeley. In 2009, he received UC Berkeley’s Golden Apple Teaching Award, the only teaching award given by UC-Berkeley’s student body. He is currently a Professor of Sociology at Stanford University, with courtesy appointments in Psychology and Organizational Behavior. In 2026, he was awarded a Guggenheim Fellowship from the John Simon Guggenheim Memorial Foundation.

== Research ==
=== Moral reframing ===
With Matthew Feinberg, Willer has studied a technique of political persuasion called “moral reframing.” They find that environmental and other political messages are more persuasive when framed in terms of an audience’s own moral values rather than the messenger’s. In 2017 Willer gave a TED talk outlining moral reframing strategies to facilitate cross-party dialogue.

=== Political polarization and democracy ===
In 2021, Willer co-led the Strengthening Democracy Challenge, a megastudy evaluating 25 interventions to reduce anti-democratic attitudes. The study identified several strategies that showed effectiveness in improving democratic attitudes, including correcting misperceptions about the prevalence of anti-democratic views among opposing partisans, illustrating the consequences of democratic collapse in other nations, and featuring endorsements of democratic engagement from trusted political leaders.

=== Masculinity threats ===
In earlier work, Willer examined the psychological effects of masculinity threats, demonstrating in a 2005 study that men whose masculinity was challenged expressed greater support for military intervention and more stereotypically masculine behaviors, including a preference for SUVs.
