= One more heave =

Phrase in British politics

"One more heave" was a slogan used by British Liberal Party leader Jeremy Thorpe during the October 1974 UK general election and a phrase used (sometimes pejoratively) to describe the political strategy of John Smith, leader of the Labour Party from July 1992 until his death in May 1994.

== Liberal Party ==
Thorpe became leader of the Liberal Party in January 1967. The 1970 UK general election was disappointing as the Liberals lost six of their twelve seats in the House of Commons. In the February 1974 UK general election, they increased their number of MPs to 14 and won over 6 million votes (19.3%), their best result in terms of seats since 1945 and in terms of the percentage of the popular vote won since 1929. The governing Conservative Party, led by Prime Minister Edward Heath, had won four fewer seats than Labour under Harold Wilson. Heath did not immediately resign, and instead entered negotiations with Thorpe and the Ulster Unionist Party to form a coalition government. Thorpe, never enthusiastic about supporting the Conservatives, demanded major electoral reforms in exchange for such an agreement. Unwilling to accept such terms, Heath resigned and Wilson returned for his second spell as Prime Minister. As Wilson did not have an overall majority, he was widely expected to call another election before too long; he did so in September 1974.

Thorpe anticipated a turning point in the Liberals' fortunes and campaigned under the slogan "one more heave", aiming for a complete breakthrough with entering a coalition a last resort. The phrase is attributed to advertising agent and Liberal parliamentary candidate Adrian Slade. The slogan was memorable, but considered uninspiring. Future Liberal Party leader David Steel called the whole campaign "a slightly less successful re-run of February."

In the October general election, the Liberals received over 700,000 fewer votes and returned 13 MPs, down one. The result was a great disappointment to Thorpe and marked the beginning of the end of his tenure as leader. He was ousted as Liberal leader in May 1976 after the Thorpe affair, which concerned his alleged homosexual relationship with Norman Scott and the shooting of Scott's dog by a hired gunman. Thorpe was later tried and acquitted of conspiracy and incitement to murder, but lost his seat at the 1979 UK general election.

David Dutton wrote in A History of the Liberal Party since 1900: "By adopting the phrase 'one more heave', the party tried to encourage the belief that its ambitions were eminently realizable [sic]. In practice, however, the task of retaining the fickle support that had been attracted in February, while at the same time persuading another substantial tranche of voters to desert their traditional preferences, was enormous. Even an extra 5 per cent of the total vote, evenly distributed across the country, would only have produced six extra MPs."

== Labour Party ==
Ahead of the 1992 UK general election, the Conservatives were campaigning for a fourth straight election victory, having recently replaced Margaret Thatcher as Prime Minister with John Major. But with Labour consistently albeit narrowly ahead, with the economy approaching recession and the Conservatives racked by internal divisions, Labour under Neil Kinnock were expected to win; however, the Conservatives confounded the polls and won the election, receiving the most votes at any general election in history, although they returned only 10 more MPs than they needed for a majority. Kinnock announced his resignation and Shadow Chancellor of the Exchequer John Smith won the 1992 Labour Party leadership election.

Under Smith, Labour adopted what many saw as a cautious approach, seeking to avoid controversy and win the next election by capitalising on the unpopularity of the Conservative government. This approach was dubbed, sometimes pejoratively, "one more heave". It exasperated some, with the Fabian Society saying in 1993 that "one more heave" meant doing nothing, changing nothing and "sleepwalking to oblivion". Labour "modernisers" like Tony Blair, Gordon Brown, and Peter Mandelson considered such an approach too timid, and were critical of it in private and later.

Others argued that this is an unfair description of Smith's approach. Former cabinet minister and former Labour Deputy Leader Roy Hattersley wrote in 1997 that Smith was "determined to modernise the party. But he wanted to bring the old principles up to date, not to replace them. He looked for intellectual improvements not ideological alternatives." The electoral success of such an approach was never tested as Smith died of a heart attack in 1994. Blair won the subsequent leadership election; he and Brown re-branded the party New Labour and then won the 1997 UK general election in a landslide. Labour strategist Peter Hyman wrote in his memoirs in 2005, "I could sense too, and share, the exasperation that some had for the 'one more heave' strategy that John Smith employed, the assumption that if Labour held tight it would win next time round. I think he was right, we would have won, but to sustain us in power and lock out the Tories, possibly for a generation, required far more brutal changes."

Numerous political commentators used the phrase (often disparagingly) when writing about potential Labour Party electoral strategy following the 2017 UK general election. The term has also been used to refer to the leadership style of party leader Jeremy Corbyn, as well as that of his successor Keir Starmer.
