= John Smith (Labour Party leader) =

British politician (1938–1994)

The Right Honourable John Smith QC
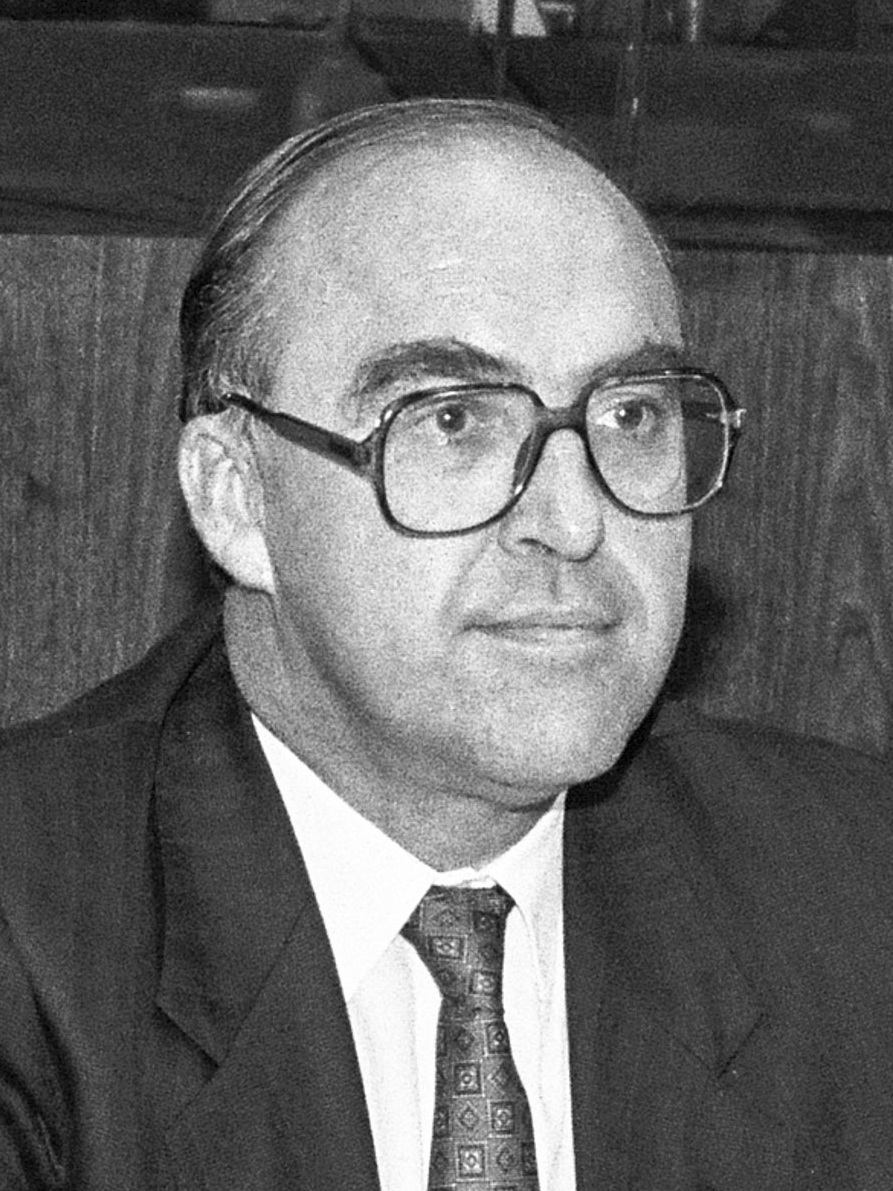
- Smith in 1989

Leader of the Opposition
- In office 18 July 1992 – 12 May 1994
- Monarch: Elizabeth II
- Prime Minister: John Major
- Preceded by: Neil Kinnock
- Succeeded by: Margaret Beckett

Leader of the Labour Party
- In office 18 July 1992 – 12 May 1994
- Deputy: Margaret Beckett
- Preceded by: Neil Kinnock
- Succeeded by: Tony Blair (Note: Margaret Beckett acted from 12 May to 21 July 1994)
Shadow portfolios
1987–1992	Shadow Chancellor of the Exchequer
1984–1987	Trade and Industry
1983–1984	Employment
1982–1983	Energy
1979–1982	Trade

Secretary of State for Trade
- In office 11 November 1978 – 4 May 1979
- Prime Minister: James Callaghan
- Preceded by: Edmund Dell
- Succeeded by: John Nott

Minister of State for the Privy Council Office
- In office 8 April 1976 – 11 November 1978
- Prime Minister: James Callaghan
- Preceded by: The Lord Crowther-Hunt
- Succeeded by: The Baroness Birk

Minister of State for Energy
- In office 4 December 1975 – 8 April 1976
- Prime Minister: Harold Wilson
- Preceded by: The Lord Balogh
- Succeeded by: Dickson Mabon

Parliamentary Under-Secretary of State for Energy
- In office 18 October 1974 – 4 December 1975
- Prime Minister: Harold Wilson
- Preceded by: Gavin Strang
- Succeeded by: The Lord Lovell-Davis

Member of Parliament for Monklands East North Lanarkshire (1970–1983)
- In office 18 June 1970 – 12 May 1994
- Preceded by: Margaret Herbison
- Succeeded by: Helen Liddell

Personal details
- Born: 13 September 1938 Dalmally, Argyll, Scotland
- Died: 12 May 1994 (aged 55) London, England
- Resting place: Reilig Odhráin, Iona, Scotland
- Party: Labour
- Spouse: Elizabeth Bennett (m. 1967)
- Children: 3, including Sarah and Catherine
- Education: Dunoon Grammar School
- Alma mater: University of Glasgow

John Smith (13 September 1938 – 12 May 1994) was a British politician who was Leader of the Opposition and Leader of the Labour Party from July 1992 until his death in May 1994. He was Member of Parliament (MP) for Monklands East.

Smith first entered Parliament in 1970 and, following junior ministerial roles as Minister of State for Energy (1975–1976) and Minister of State for the Privy Council Office (1976–1978), he entered the Cabinet towards the end of James Callaghan's tenure as prime minister, as Secretary of State for Trade and President of the Board of Trade (1978–1979). During Labour's time in Opposition to Margaret Thatcher's Conservative government, he rose through the Shadow Cabinet, as Shadow Secretary of State for Trade (1979–1982), Energy (1982–1983), Employment (1983–1984), Trade and Industry (1984–1987) and Shadow Chancellor of the Exchequer (1987–1992).

After Labour leader Neil Kinnock resigned following the Party's surprise loss in the 1992 general election to new Conservative leader John Major, Smith was elected his successor in July 1992. He continued Kinnock's moves to reform Labour, abolishing the trade union block vote at Labour Party Conferences and replacing it with "one member, one vote" at the 1993 party conference. However, his overall cautious approach to reform, which was dubbed "one more heave", sought to avoid controversy and win the next election by capitalising on the unpopularity of the Conservative government. This frustrated Tony Blair and Gordon Brown, as well as Peter Mandelson. Following Smith's sudden death in May 1994, he was succeeded as leader by Blair, who led the party to victory at the next general election in 1997.

== Early life ==
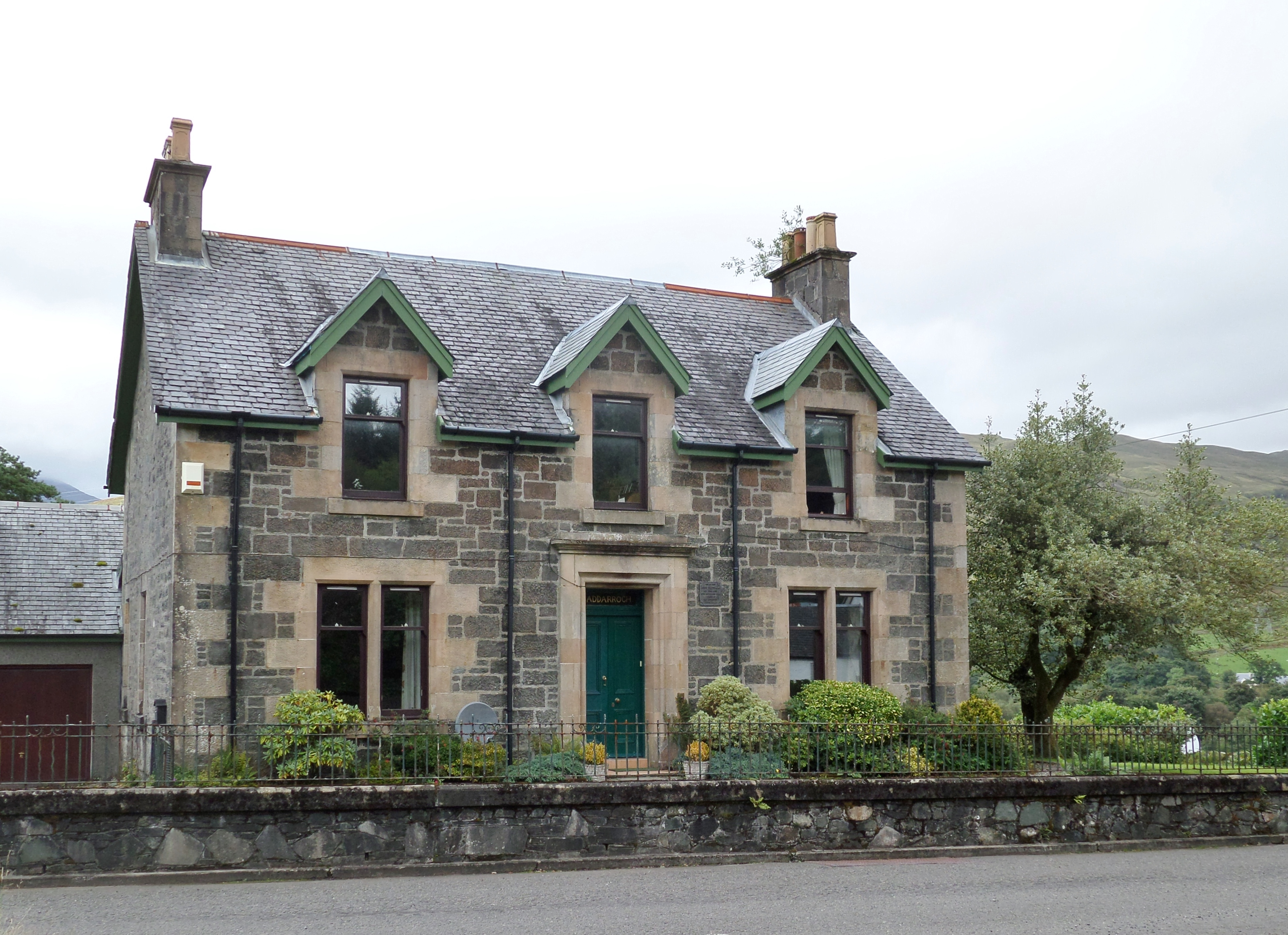
Smith's birthplace in Dalmally, Glenorchy

Smith was born at Baddarroch, Dalmally, Argyll, the eldest of three children of Sarah Cameron, née Scott (29 July 1910 – 11 January 1997), and Archibald Leitch Smith (18 June 1907 – 1981). At the time of Smith's birth, his father was schoolmaster at Portnahaven, Islay; however, two years later he became the headmaster of the primary school at Ardrishaig, Argyll, which Smith went on to attend. From September 1952, Smith attended Dunoon Grammar School, lodging in the town with a landlady and going home during the school holidays, before enrolling at the University of Glasgow. He studied History from 1956 to 1959, and then Law. He joined the Labour Party in 1955.

Smith became involved in debating with the Glasgow University Dialectic Society and the Glasgow University Union, and in 1962 won The Observer Mace debating competition, speaking with Gordon Hunter. In 1995, following his death, the competition was renamed the John Smith Memorial Mace in his honour.

In 1963, he became a solicitor and then in 1967, an advocate at the Scottish bar, supplementing his income by working as a libel lawyer for the Daily Record and the Sunday Mail.

== Member of Parliament ==
Smith first stood as a Labour parliamentary candidate aged 23 at a by-election in 1961 in the East Fife constituency; he contested that seat again in the 1964 general election. As it was a safe seat for the Unionist Party (who at the time ran in place of the Conservatives), Smith came second by some distance on both occasions. At the 1970 general election he was elected as Member of Parliament (MP) for North Lanarkshire, succeeding Peggy Herbison. Smith made his maiden speech on 10 November 1970, opposing the Conservative government's Family Income Supplements Act 1970. On 28 October 1971, Smith defied the Labour whips in joining Labour MPs led by Roy Jenkins to vote in favour of entry to the European Communities. These included Roy Hattersley, Shirley Williams, Bill Rodgers and David Owen, with all of whom he was later to sit in the Callaghan cabinet.

=== In government ===
In February 1974, Smith declined Harold Wilson's offer of the office of Solicitor General for Scotland, not wishing his political career to become side-lined as a law officer. In October, he was made an under-secretary of state at the Department of Energy. In December 1975, he was made a minister of state. Smith supported James Callaghan in the Labour Party leadership election after Wilson resigned in April 1976. When Callaghan became prime minister, Smith became a minister of state at the Privy Council Office, serving with Labour's deputy leader, Michael Foot, the Lord President of the Council and Leader of the House of Commons. In this position, Smith piloted the highly controversial devolution proposals for Scotland and Wales through the House of Commons.

Smith's adroit handling of these proposals impressed Callaghan, and in November 1978, when Edmund Dell retired, Callaghan appointed Smith secretary of state for trade. In this post, Smith was the youngest member of the cabinet, and served there until the 1979 general election.

=== Shadow Cabinet ===
Smith was voted to the Shadow Cabinet in the elections of June 1979 and would be re-elected every year until 1992. Smith became Shadow Energy Secretary. In the Labour leadership election of November 1980, Smith voted for Denis Healey over Michael Foot. Smith remained in the Labour Party after figures on the right of the party formed the breakaway Social Democratic Party, remarking: "I am comfortable with the unions. They aren't. That's the big difference". Smith voted for Healey in the deputy leadership election of September 1981.

He became a QC in 1983, the same year that his constituency became Monklands East. During the 1983 general election, Smith concentrated on unemployment, arguing that the Conservatives had caused deindustrialisation and that a Labour government would increase investment, and therefore employment. Smith received over 50 per cent of the vote in Monklands East, but Labour lost badly nationally. Smith then acted as Roy Hattersley's campaign manager in the leadership election and the deputy leadership election. After serving a year as Shadow Employment Secretary, Smith was Shadow Secretary of State for Trade and Industry between late 1984 and 1987.

=== Shadow Chancellor of the Exchequer ===
Smith was appointed Shadow Chancellor by Neil Kinnock in July 1987 following the Labour Party's general election defeat. Despite a quiet, modest manner and his politically moderate stance, he was a witty, often scathing speaker. Smith was named as Parliamentarian of the Year twice: first in November 1986 for his performances during the Westland controversy during which Leon Brittan resigned, and the second time in November 1989 for taking Nigel Lawson to task over the state of the economy and over his difficult relationship with Sir Alan Walters, the prime minister's economic adviser. Smith made two notably witty attacks on Lawson that year. On 7 June 1989, he sang the theme tune for the soap Neighbours at the dispatch box, lampooning the differences between Lawson and Walters, who was critical of Lawson's policies but whom Thatcher refused to sack. Then, on 24 October, he made another scathing attack on the differences. Two days later, Lawson resigned, followed shortly afterwards by Walters.

=== Leader of the Opposition ===
Following Labour's fourth consecutive defeat at the general election of April 1992, Neil Kinnock resigned as leader and Smith was elected Labour leader.

Although Labour had now been out of power for 13 years, their performance in the 1992 election had been much better than in the previous three. They had cut the Conservative majority from 102 seats to 21, and for most of the three years leading up to the election, opinion polls had indicated that Labour were more likely to win the election than the Conservatives. The resignation of long-serving but increasingly unpopular Conservative prime minister Margaret Thatcher, and the well-received election of John Major as her successor, had seen the comfortable Labour lead in the opinion polls wiped out and in the 17 months leading up to the election, its outcome had become much harder to predict. Much of the blame had been placed on Labour's "shadow budget" drawn up by Smith, which included raising the top rate of income tax from 40p in the pound to 50p, and the Conservative election campaign was centred on warning voters that they would face higher taxes under a Labour government.

In September 1992, Smith made his maiden Commons speech as party leader, in which he attacked the government's ERM debacle eight days earlier – an event which was seen by many observers as playing a large part in determining the outcome of the next general election, long before it was even on the political horizon, as from that point onwards the Labour Party was ascendant in the opinion polls, winning several seats from the Conservatives in by-elections (eventually even attracting a Conservative MP to defect to Labour) and trouncing them in local council elections.

In this speech, he referred to John Major as "the devalued Prime Minister of a devalued Government". At Labour's party conference, Smith branded Major and Norman Lamont the "Laurel and Hardy of British politics". This echoed his attacks on Major's government made before the 1992 election (while he was still shadow chancellor), most memorably when he labelled "irresponsible" Conservative plans for cutting income tax to 20 per cent, and joked at a Labour Party rally in Sheffield that the Conservatives would have a box-office disaster with "Honey, I Shrunk the Economy" – in reference to the recent Disney motion picture Honey, I Shrunk the Kids – mocking the recession which was plaguing the British economy at the time.

In a June 1993 debate, Smith again savaged the Conservative government, saying that under John Major's premiership, "the man with the non-Midas touch is in charge. It is no wonder that we live in a country where the Grand National does not start and hotels fall into the sea" (in reference to the 1993 Grand National, which was cancelled after a false start, and to Holbeck Hall Hotel in Scarborough, which had recently collapsed off a cliff).

During the same debate, Smith commented on a recent government defeat in the Newbury by-election to the Liberal Democrats, a poor showing in the local elections and a subsequent Cabinet reshuffle by saying that "if we were to offer that tale of events to the BBC Light Entertainment Department as a script for a programme, I think that the producers of Yes Minister would have turned it down as hopelessly over the top. It might have even been too much for Some Mothers Do 'Ave 'Em". In the same speech, Smith also attacked the Conservatives' broken election promises (in particular Lamont's recent Budget decision to impose VAT on domestic energy bills) – claiming he possessed the last copy of a 1992 policy document "to escape the Central Office shredder". He also performed very well in the July 1993 motion of confidence debate on the Conservative government.

Despite his dispatch box successes (Smith was always more effective in the House of Commons than on platforms or at Prime Minister's Questions, though he began to improve at the latter towards the end of his life), Tony Blair and Gordon Brown were, under Smith's leadership, restless and privately anxious that the party had adopted a "One more heave" approach and had become over-cautious in tackling the legacy of "tax and spend".

Despite this, during his time as leader of the Labour Party, Smith abolished the trade union block vote at Labour Party Conferences and replaced it with "One member, one vote" at the 1993 party conference. He also committed a future Labour government to establishing a Scottish Parliament, an aim fulfilled by his successors following his death (most notably his close friend Donald Dewar). Smith was also a committed British Unionist. During Smith's tenure as leader the Labour Party gained a significant lead in the polls over the Conservatives; on 5 May 1994, one week before Smith's death, the Conservatives suffered a major defeat in the British council elections, their worst in over 30 years. This happened in spite of the strong economic recovery and reduction of unemployment which had followed the declaration of the recession's end in April 1993. In May 1994, a poll estimated that the Labour Party was on average 23 points ahead of the Conservative Party.

== Health problems and death ==
=== First heart attack ===
Smith suffered a heart attack on 9 October 1988, and was forced to spend three months away from Westminster to recover. On that occasion, he had complained of chest pains the night before and had to be persuaded to cancel a flight to London so he could go to hospital for a check-up. He was examined at the Edinburgh Royal Infirmary by an ECG. The doctor who examined him said, "Whatever it is, we don't think it is your heart". Then, Smith suddenly collapsed and was briefly unconscious before coming around. He spent three days in intensive care before leaving hospital on 20 October 1988 and made a full recovery.

Smith made modifications to his lifestyle by going on a diet of 1,000 calories per day, cutting down on rich foods and fine wines, giving up smoking and taking up Munro bagging. By the time of his death, he had succeeded in climbing 108 of the 277 Scottish Munros (mountains over 3,000 feet above sea level at the summit). His weight dropped from 15 stone 5 pounds (98 kg) at the time of the first heart attack, to 12 stone 10 pounds (81 kg) when he returned to Parliament on 23 January 1989.

=== Death and tributes ===
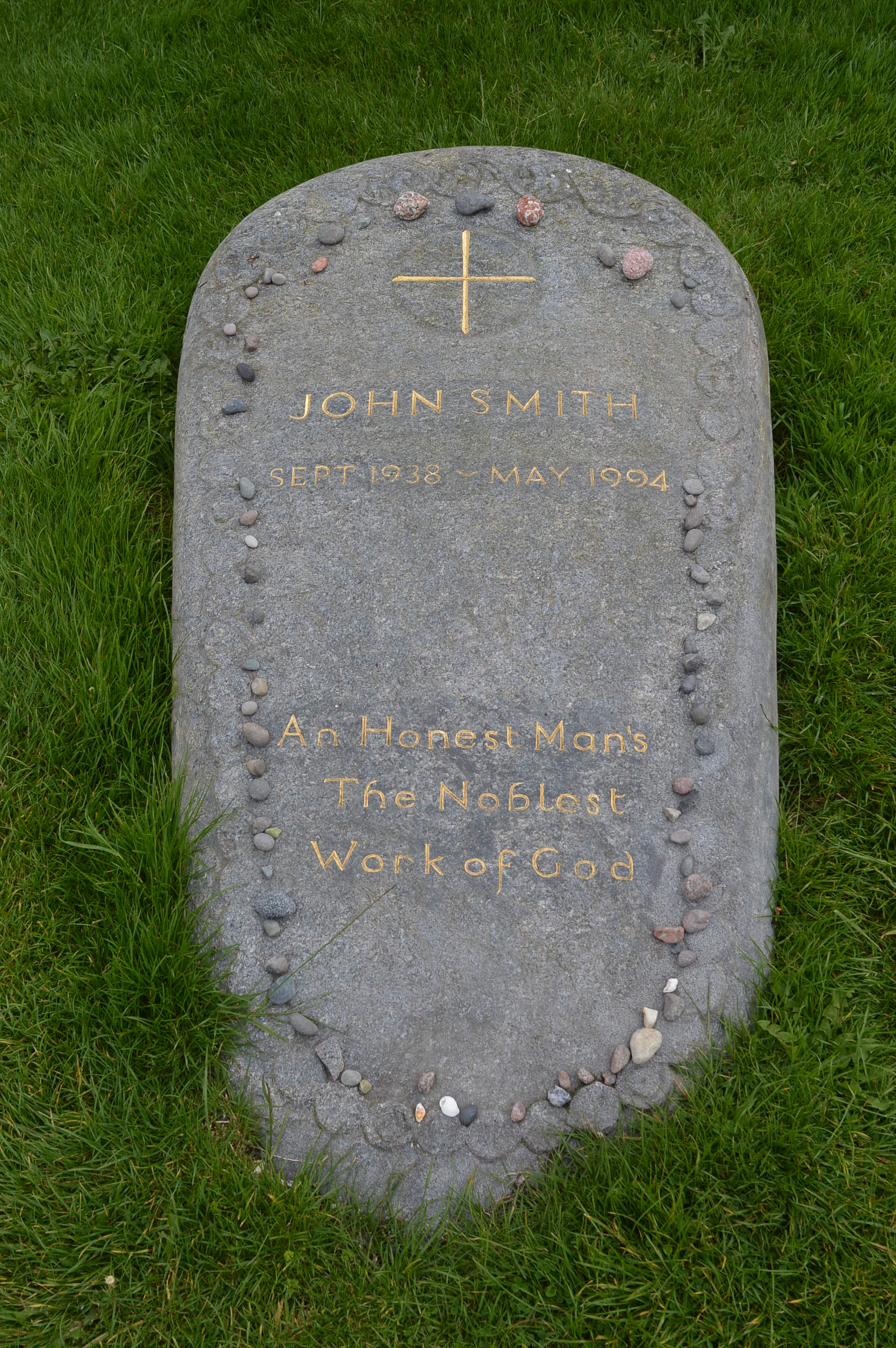
Gravestone of Smith on the island of Iona, Scotland. The epitaph is from An Essay on Man by Alexander Pope.

On the evening of 11 May 1994, with around 500 people present, Smith made a speech at a fundraising dinner at Park Lane Hotel, London, saying "The opportunity to serve our country—that is all we ask". At 8:05am the following morning, whilst in his Barbican flat, Smith suffered a fatal heart attack. His wife phoned an ambulance and he was taken to St Bartholomew's Hospital where he died at 9:15am, having never regained consciousness. On 28 April, a fortnight before his death, Smith had visited the same accident and emergency department to campaign against its proposed closure; it had also been the subject of his questions at Prime Minister's Questions later that day. The doctor who had served as his tour guide, Professor Mike Besser, tried unsuccessfully to save Smith's life.

In response to his death, the Speaker of the House of Commons Betty Boothroyd recalled Parliament to give MPs the opportunity to pay tribute to him. Prime Minister John Major was the first who paid tribute, including the line that he and Smith "would share a drink: sometimes tea, sometimes not tea". It was reported that there was weeping in the chamber. MPs from across the house also paid tribute to him, including Margaret Beckett, Paddy Ashdown, Neil Kinnock and Dennis Skinner.

On the day of his death, the BBC Nine O'Clock News was extended to an hour as opposed to the usual half-hour. This replaced the medical drama which was due to follow at 9:30, coincidentally entitled Cardiac Arrest. During Question Time that evening, panellists paid tribute to Smith instead of debating. George Robertson and Menzies Campbell were among the participants.

On 20 May 1994, following a public funeral service in Cluny Parish Church, Edinburgh, which was attended by almost 1,000 people, Smith was buried in a private family service on the island of Iona, at the sacred burial ground of Reilig Odhráin, where many early Scottish and Norse kings are said to be buried. His grave is marked with an epitaph quoting the Fourth Epistle of An Essay on Man by Alexander Pope: "An honest man's the noblest work of God". His close friend Donald Dewar acted as one of Smith's pallbearers. On 14 July 1994, a memorial service for Smith took place at Westminster Abbey and was attended by over 2,000 people. The Archbishop of Canterbury, George Carey, gave an address.

==== Aftermath in the Labour Party ====
Following Smith's death, the Labour Party renamed its Walworth Road headquarters John Smith House in his memory. Tony Blair, Smith's successor as Leader of the Labour Party, was an effective campaigner who capitalised on public mistrust of the Conservative Party to win a landslide victory at the 1997 general election.

Smith's biographer, Mark Stuart, said that Smith could have won Labour a victory in 1997 on a scale similar to that achieved by Blair because of the combination of the Black Wednesday debacle and internal Conservative Party divisions over Europe since 1992; estimating that, in the absence of the "Blair effect", the Conservative Party would have held slightly over 200 seats (rather than the 165 it actually won) in the House of Commons, leaving the Conservatives in a position similar to that of Labour following the 1983 general election.

== Personal life ==
Smith was married to Elizabeth Bennett from 5 July 1967 until his death. Elizabeth Smith was created Baroness Smith of Gilmorehill in 1995. They had three daughters including Sarah Smith and Catherine Smith.

== Notes ==
Parliament of the United Kingdom
Preceded by Margaret Herbison	Member of Parliament for North Lanarkshire; 1970–1983	Constituency abolished
New constituency	Member of Parliament for Monklands East; 1983–1994	Succeeded by Helen Liddell
Political offices
Preceded by Edmund Dell	Secretary of State for Trade and President of the Board of Trade; 1978–1979	Succeeded by John Nott
New office	Shadow Secretary of State for Trade; 1979–1982	Succeeded by Peter Archer
Preceded by Merlyn Rees	Shadow Secretary of State for Energy; 1982–1983	Succeeded by Stan Orme
Preceded by Eric Varley	Shadow Secretary of State for Employment; 1983–1984	Succeeded by John Prescott
Preceded by Peter Shore	Shadow Secretary of State for Trade and Industry; 1984–1987	Succeeded by Bryan Gould
Preceded by Roy Hattersley	Shadow Chancellor of the Exchequer; 1987–1992	Succeeded by Gordon Brown
Preceded by Neil Kinnock	Leader of the Opposition; 1992–1994	Succeeded by Margaret Beckett
Party political offices
Preceded by Neil Kinnock	Leader of the Labour Party; 1992–1994	Succeeded by Tony Blair
