= Megastudy =

New research technique

A megastudy or mega-study is a research study in which a large number of different treatments or interventions are tested at the same time, on the same sample or similar samples, using a common outcome measure, and using the same experimental protocol.

== Megastudy examples ==
- Exercise encouragement
- Vaccination nudges
- Strengthening of democratic attitudes
- Interventions against climate change

== Many-lab studies ==
The megastudy technique can be combined with the many-labs approach, so that teams of researchers from across the planet conduct the same experiment locally.

== Megastudy criticisms ==
- Statistical power: While the overall megastudy sample size may be large, the sample size per intervention may be relatively small, leading to underpowered designs with wide confidence intervals. As a result, while interventions may be comparable, their relative ranking by outcome measure may be noisy. Increased sample size can help address this issue.
- Lack of theory: The megastudy technique may be considered a form of "fishing expedition" for what interventions have strongest effect on the outcome measure, without much theory building.
