= Privy Council Office (United Kingdom) =

Administrative support to the Privy Council

- Arms used by the Privy Council Office

Department overview
- Headquarters: 1 Horse Guards Road London SW1A 2HQ
- Employees: 6
- Minister responsible: Sir Alan Campbell, Lord President of the Council
- Department executives: Richard Tilbrook, CVO, Clerk of the Privy Council; Niall Clarke-Petty, Head of Office and Deputy Clerk of the Privy Council; Daniel Currie, Deputy Head of Office
- Website: privycouncil.independent.gov.uk

The Privy Council Office (PCO) provides secretariat and administrative support to the Lord President of the Council in his or her capacity as president of His Majesty's Most Honourable Privy Council. The head of the office is the Clerk of the Privy Council. The PCO is an independent unit based in the Cabinet Office.

== See also ==
- Minister of State for the Privy Council Office
