= Anthony Heath =

British sociologist

Anthony Francis Heath, CBE, FBA (born 15 December 1942) is a British sociologist who is a professor of sociology at Oxford University and a professorial fellow of Nuffield College, Oxford.

== Life and career ==
Anthony Heath studied classics and economics at Trinity College, Cambridge, receiving a double first. After a spell in the Treasury he returned to Cambridge to study for a doctorate on social exchange theory with John H Goldthorpe as supervisor. He then moved to Jesus College, Oxford, as a tutorial fellow, followed by an official fellowship and then a professorial fellowship at Nuffield College, when he became Oxford's first professor of sociology in 1999, and founded the Oxford Department of Sociology. He was elected a fellow of the British Academy in 1992. He is also a fellow of the European Academy of Sociology.

At Oxford he first worked with Chelly Halsey and John Ridge investigating social class inequalities in education, analysing the 1972 Nuffield social mobility survey and working in the political arithmetic tradition. He has been closely associated with this tradition of research ever since, analysing large-scale social surveys to investigate 'real world' issues of class, gender and ethnic stratification. A recent study in this tradition is his 2001 Oxford Admissions Study, which investigated the extent to which Oxford admissions procedures followed meritocratic principles.

Together with Roger Jowell and John Curtice, he directed the 1983, 1987, 1992 and 1997 British Election Surveys, focussing particularly on the topics of class voting, social change and the future of the left in Britain. More recently he has focussed on issues of ethnic inequality, particularly on ‘ethnic penalties’ in education and the labour market. He coordinated a major cross-national investigation of ethnic inequalities in the labour market in Western countries, comparing the magnitude of the ethnic penalties experienced by different minorities in different countries. Current work includes a major new national study of ethnic minority political integration based on the Ethnic Minority British Election Survey. He leads the Centre for social investigation, an interdisciplinary research group based at Nuffield College. He has written reports for government on discrimination in the labour market, social cohesion, and on national identity.

== Selected bibliography ==
- Heath, A F (2018) Social Progress in Britain. Oxford: Oxford University Press
- Li, Y; Heath, A F (2017). "The socio-economic integration of ethnic minorities". Social Inclusion. 5: 1–4. doi:10.17645/si.v5i1.943.
- Clark, T; Heath, A F (2015). Hard Times: Inequality, Recession, Aftermath. New Haven: Yale University Press.
- Clark, T; Heath, A F (2014). Hard Times: The Divisive Toll of the Economic Slump. New Haven: Yale University Press.
- Heath, A F and Brinbaum, Y (eds) (2014). Unequal Attainments: Ethnic educational inequalities in ten Western countries. Oxford: Oxford University Press.
- Heath, A F (2014). Migrants and Their Children in Britain: Generational Change in Patterns of Ethnic Minority Integration. London: Routledge.
- Heath, A F, Fisher, S D, Rosenblatt, G, Sanders, D and Sobolewska, M (2013). The Political Integration of Ethnic Minorities in Britain. Oxford: Oxford University Press.
- Heath, A F, Sullivan, A (eds) (2011). Expansion and equity in secondary education. Abingdon: Routledge.
- Heath, A F (2010). Rational Choice and Social Exchange: A Critique of Exchange Theory (Themes in the Social Sciences). Cambridge: Cambridge University Press.
- Heath, A F and Jeffery, R (eds) (2010). Diversity and Change in Modern India. Proceedings of the British Academy 159. Oxford: Oxford University Press.
- Heath, A F and S Y Cheung (eds) (2007). Unequal Chances: Ethnic Minorities in Western Labour Markets. Proceedings of the British Academy 137. Oxford: Oxford University Press.
- Heath, A F, Ermisch, J and Gallie, D (eds) (2005). Understanding Social Change. Oxford: Oxford University Press.
- Heath, A F, Jowell, R M and Curtice, J K (2001). The Rise of New Labour: Party Policies and Voter Choices. Oxford: Oxford University Press.
- Goldstein, H; Heath, A F (2000). Educational Standards. Proceedings of the British Academy 102. Oxford: Oxford University Press.
- Heath, A F, Breen, R, and Whelan, C (eds) (1999). Ireland, North and South: Perspectives from the Social Sciences. Proceedings of the British Academy 98. Oxford: Clarendon Press.
- Heath, A F, Jowell, R M and Curtice, J K with Taylor B (eds) (1994). Labour's Last Chance? The 1992 Election and Beyond. Aldershot: Dartmouth.
- Crouch, C and Heath A F (eds) (1992). Social Research and Social Reform: Essays in Honour of A.H. Halsey. Oxford: Oxford University Press.
- Heath, A F; et al. (1991). Understanding Political Change: The British Voter 1964–1987. Oxford: Pergamon Press.
- Heath, A F, Jowell, R M and Curtice, J K (1985). How Britain Votes. Oxford: Pergamon Press.
- Heath, A F (1981). Social Mobility. London: Fontana.
- Heath, A F, ed. (1981). Scientific Explanation. Oxford: Clarendon Press.
- Halsey, A H, Heath, A F and Ridge, J M (1980). Origins and Destinations: Family, Class and Education in Modern Britain. Oxford: Clarendon Press.
- Heath, A F (1976). Rational Choice and Social Exchange. Cambridge: Cambridge University Press.
