= Minister of State for the Privy Council Office =

Minister in the UK Government

The Minister of State for the Privy Council Office was a ministerial office in the Privy Council Office of the British government in the late 20th century.

== List ==
Office	Dates	Party	Prime Minister
Gerald Fowler	18 October 1974 - 1976	Labour	Harold Wilson
Norman Crowther Hunt, Baron Crowther-Hunt	23 January 1976 - 1976	Labour	Harold Wilson
John Smith	8 April 1976 - 1979	Labour	Harold Wilson
Alma Birk, Baroness Birk	3 January 1979 - 1979	Labour	James Callaghan
Grey Gowrie, 2nd Earl of Gowrie	11 June 1983 – 11 September 1984	Conservative	Margaret Thatcher
Richard Luce	2 September 1985 – 24 July 1990	Conservative	Margaret Thatcher
David Mellor	24 July 1990 – 28 November 1990	Conservative	Margaret Thatcher
