= List of Privy Council orders =

This is a list of orders made by the British Privy Council.

A list of all Orders in Council and Orders of Council made between July 1994 and September 2000 is held by the Privy Council Office in an Access database. The ID number used in this table is the identifier in that database.

== 1-100 ==
ID	Date	Venue	Order Name	Order Subject	SI Number
1	29/07/94	Council Chamber Whitehall	Medical Act 1983	The General Medical Council (Constitution of Fitness to Practise Committees) (Amendment) Rules Order of Council 1994	1994/2022
2	11/08/94	Council Chamber Whitehall	Chartered Society of Physiotherapy	Bye-Law Amendments	
3	11/08/94	Council Chamber Whitehall	Institution of Electrical Engineers	Bye-Law Amendments	
4	08/09/94	Council Chamber Whitehall	University of Kent, Canterbury	Statute Amendments	
5	09/09/94	Council Chamber Whitehall	Further and Higher Education (Scotland) Act 1992	The Queen Margaret College, Edinburgh (Scotland) Order of Council 1994	1994/2371
6	12/09/94	Council Chamber Whitehall	Royal Pharmaceutical Society of Great Britain	Byelaw Amendments	
7	12/09/94	Council Chamber Whitehall	University of Dundee	Statute Amendments	
8	27/09/94	Council Chamber Whitehall	Education Reform Act 1988	Northern School of Contemporary Dance: Instrument of Government	
9	27/09/94	Council Chamber Whitehall	Education Reform Act 1988	Norwich School of Art and Design: Instrument of Government	
10	27/09/94	Council Chamber Whitehall	Education Reform Act 1988	Writtle Agricultural College: Instrument of Government	
11	29/09/94	Council Chamber Whitehall	University of Leeds	Statute Amendments	
12	04/10/94	Council Chamber Whitehall	Opticians Act 1989	The General Optical Council (Companies Committee Rules) Order of Council 1994	1994/2579
13	06/10/94	Council Chamber Whitehall	City and Guilds of London Institute	Statute Amendments	
14	06/10/94	Council Chamber Whitehall	City University	Statute Amendments	
15	06/10/94	Council Chamber Whitehall	Institute of Physics	By-Law Amendments	
16	17/10/94	Court of St. James's	United Nations Act 1946	The Former Yugoslavia (United Nations Sanctions) (Channel Islands) Order 1994	1994/2675
17	17/10/94	Court of St. James's	United Nations Act 1946	The Former Yugoslavia (United Nations Sanctions) (Dependent Territories) Order 1994	1994/2674
18	17/10/94	Court of St. James's	United Nations Act 1946	The Former Yugoslavia (United Nations Sanctions) (Isle of Man) Order 1994	1994/2676
19	17/10/94	Court of St. James's	United Nations Act 1946	The Former Yugoslavia (United Nations Sanctions) Order 1994	1994/2673
20	17/10/94	Court of St. James's	University of Manchester Institute of Science and Technology	Charter and Statute Amendments	
21	25/10/94	Council Chamber Whitehall	Ministerial Appointment	David Philip Heathcoat-Amory Sworn Paymaster General	
22	02/11/94	Buckingham Palace	Alderney	Hawkers Amendment (Alderney) Law 1994	
23	02/11/94	Buckingham Palace	Bishops (Retirement) Measure 1986	Resignation of Archbishop of York, John Stapylton	
24	02/11/94	Buckingham Palace	British Institute of Radiology	Amendment to Charter	
25	02/11/94	Council Chamber Whitehall	British Institute of Radiology	Byelaw Amendments	
26	02/11/94	Buckingham Palace	Burial Act 1853	Burials: Finals: 12 Churchyards	
27	02/11/94	Buckingham Palace	Burial Act 1853	Burials: Notice: 8 Churchyards	
28	02/11/94	Buckingham Palace	Burial Act 1853	Burials: Variation: St Michael and All Angels, Melksham, Wiltshire	
29	02/11/94	Buckingham Palace	Child Abduction and Custody Act 1985	The Child Abduction and Custody (Parties to Conventions) (Amendment) (No. 5) Order 1994	1994/2792
30	02/11/94	Buckingham Palace	Child Abduction and Custody Act 1985	The Child Abduction and Custody Act 1985 (Isle of Man) Order 1994	1994/2799
31	02/11/94	Buckingham Palace	Church Commissioners Schemes	Diocese of Bristol: Broad Blunsdon	
32	02/11/94	Buckingham Palace	Church Commissioners Schemes	Diocese of Chester: St George, Stockport	
33	02/11/94	Buckingham Palace	Church Commissioners Schemes	Diocese of Durham: St John the Evangelist, Dipton	
34	02/11/94	Buckingham Palace	Church Commissioners Schemes	Diocese of Exeter: Parkham, Alwight, Buckland, Brewer and Abotsham	
35	02/11/94	Buckingham Palace	Church Commissioners Schemes	Diocese of Hereford: Bolstone	
36	02/11/94	Buckingham Palace	Church Commissioners Schemes	Diocese of Lincoln: All Saints, Grimsby	
37	02/11/94	Buckingham Palace	Church Commissioners Schemes	Diocese of London: St mark, North Audley Street	
38	02/11/94	Buckingham Palace	Church Commissioners Schemes	Diocese of Norwich: Kirby Bedon	
39	02/11/94	Buckingham Palace	Church Commissioners Schemes	Diocese of Norwich: Pulham	
40	02/11/94	Buckingham Palace	Church Commissioners Schemes	Diocese of Norwich: Raveningham	
41	02/11/94	Buckingham Palace	Church Commissioners Schemes	Diocese of Norwich: Trimingham	
42	02/11/94	Buckingham Palace	Church Commissioners Schemes	Diocese of Oxford: Cogges	
43	02/11/94	Buckingham Palace	Church Commissioners Schemes	Diocese of Oxford: New Marston	
44	02/11/94	Buckingham Palace	Church Commissioners Schemes	Diocese of Oxford: Thatcham	
45	02/11/94	Buckingham Palace	Church Commissioners Schemes	Diocese of Sheffield: Wath upon Dearne	
46	02/11/94	Buckingham Palace	Church Commissioners Schemes	Diocese of Worcester: Upton Snodsbury and Boughton Hackett	
47	02/11/94	Buckingham Palace	Church Commissioners Schemes	Diocese of York: Aberford	
48	02/11/94	Buckingham Palace	City University	Appointment of Richard Charles Harvey as Visitor	
49	02/11/94	Buckingham Palace	Consular Fees Act 1980	The Consular Fees Order 1994	1994/2793
50	02/11/94	Buckingham Palace	European Communities Act 1972	The European Communities (Designation) (No. 4) Order 1994	1994/2791
51	02/11/94	Buckingham Palace	Extradition Act 1989	The European Convention on Extradition (Bulgaria) (Amendment) Order 1994	1994/2796
52	02/11/94	Buckingham Palace	Extradition Act 1989	The Extradition (Drug Trafficking) (Certain Territories) Order 1994	1994/2794
53	02/11/94	Buckingham Palace	Family Law Act 1986	The Family Law Act 1986 (Dependent Territories) (Amendment) Order 1994	1994/2800
54	02/11/94	Buckingham Palace	General Dental Council	Appointment of Brian Currie as member	
55	02/11/94	Buckingham Palace	Guernsey	Conditions of Employment (Guernsey) Law 1994	
56	02/11/94	Buckingham Palace	Guernsey	Domestic Proceedings and Magistrate's Court (Amendment) (Guernsey) Law 1994	
57	02/11/94	Buckingham Palace	Guernsey	Income Tax (Pension Amendments) (Guernsey) Law 1994	
58	02/11/94	Buckingham Palace	Hospital of St John of Jerusalem	Statute Amendments	
59	02/11/94	Buckingham Palace	Jersey	Advocates (Amendment No. 3) (Jersey) Law 1994	
60	02/11/94	Buckingham Palace	Jersey	Finance (Jersey) Law 1994	
61	02/11/94	Buckingham Palace	Jersey	Finance (No. 2) (Jersey) Law 1994	
62	02/11/94	Buckingham Palace	Jersey	Finance (No. 3) (Jersey) Law 1994	
63	02/11/94	Buckingham Palace	Jersey	Gambling (Amendment No. 3) (Jersey) Law 1994	
64	02/11/94	Buckingham Palace	Jersey	Limited Partnerships (Jersey) Law 1994	
65	02/11/94	Buckingham Palace	Jesus College, Oxford	Amendment of Statute XI	
66	02/11/94	Buckingham Palace	Law Society	Amendment to Supplemental Charter	
67	02/11/94	Buckingham Palace	Northern Ireland Act 1974	The Criminal Justice (Northern Ireland) Order 1994	1994/2795
68	02/11/94	Buckingham Palace	Northern Ireland Act 1974	The Ports (Northern Ireland Consequential Provisions) Order 1994	1994/2810
69	02/11/94	Buckingham Palace	Northern Ireland Act 1974	The Ports (Northern Ireland) Order 1994	1994/2809
70	02/11/94	Buckingham Palace	Order of Reference	British College of Optometrists: Charter of Incorporation	
71	02/11/94	Buckingham Palace	Order of Reference	Worshipful Company of Saddlers: Supplemental Charter	
72	02/11/94	Buckingham Palace	Parliament	Prorogation of Parliament	
73	02/11/94	Buckingham Palace	Privy Counsellor Appointment	Sir Robert Andrew Morritt	
74	02/11/94	Buckingham Palace	Privy Counsellor Appointment	Sir Swinton Barclay Thomas	
75	02/11/94	Buckingham Palace	Queen Elizabeth House, Oxford	Surrender of Charter	
76	02/11/94	Buckingham Palace	Royal College of Music	Supplemental Charter	
77	02/11/94	Buckingham Palace	Sark	Organisation for Economic Co-operation Development (Sark) law 1995	
78	02/11/94	Buckingham Palace	Sark	European Bank for Reconstruction and Development (Sark) Law 1994	
79	02/11/94	Buckingham Palace	Social Security Administration Act 1992	The Social Security (Jersey and Guernsey) Order 1994	1994/2802
80	02/11/94	Buckingham Palace	Summer Time Act 1972	The Summer Time Order 1994	1994/2798
81	02/11/94	Buckingham Palace	Trade Marks Act 1994	The Trade Marks (Claims to Priority from Relevant Countries) Order 1994	1994/2803
82	02/11/94	Buckingham Palace	United Nations Act 1946	The Former Yugoslavia (United Nations Sanctions) (Channel Islands) (Amendment) Order 1994	1994/2797
83	02/11/94	Buckingham Palace	University of Glasgow	Ordinance 198	
84	02/11/94	Buckingham Palace	University of Newcastle upon Tyne	Amendment of Statutes	
85	24/11/94	Buckingham Palace	Alderney	The Corruption (Alderney) Law 1994	
86	24/11/94	Buckingham Palace	Burial Act 1853	Burials: Notice: St Nicholas Churchyard, Barkston	
87	24/11/94	Buckingham Palace	Burial Act 1853	Burials: Variation: St Mary the Virgin, Edelsborough	
88	24/11/94	Buckingham Palace	Charities Act 1993	The Exempt Charities (No. 2) Order 1994	1994/2956
89	24/11/94	Buckingham Palace	Church Commissioners Schemes	Diocese of Birmingham: Saint Paul, west Smethwick	
90	24/11/94	Buckingham Palace	Church Commissioners Schemes	Diocese of Birmingham: The Resurrection, Smethwick	
91	24/11/94	Buckingham Palace	Church Commissioners Schemes	Diocese of Derby: Bonsall	
92	24/11/94	Buckingham Palace	Church Commissioners Schemes	Diocese of Exeter: Otterton	
93	24/11/94	Buckingham Palace	Church Commissioners Schemes	Diocese of Leicester: St Mark, Leicester	
94	24/11/94	Buckingham Palace	Church Commissioners Schemes	Diocese of Oxford: Henley on Thames	
95	24/11/94	Buckingham Palace	Church Commissioners Schemes	Diocese of Peterborough: St Paul, Northampton	
96	24/11/94	Buckingham Palace	Church Commissioners Schemes	Diocese of Sheffield: Tankersley	
97	24/11/94	Buckingham Palace	Church Commissioners Schemes	Diocese of Southwark: St Martin, Croydon	
98	24/11/94	Buckingham Palace	Education (Schools) Act 1992	The Education (Chief Inspector of Schools in Wales) Order 1994	1994/2957
99	24/11/94	Buckingham Palace	Guernsey	Criminal Justice (Suspended Sentence Supervision Orders) (Amendment) (Bailiwick of Guernsey) Law 1994	
100	24/11/94	Buckingham Palace	Guernsey	Road Traffic (Road Humps) (Amendment) (Guernsey) Law 1994	

== 101-200 ==
ID	Date	Venue	Order Name	Order Subject	SI Number
101	24/11/94	Buckingham Palace	Guernsey	Vessels and Speedboats (Compulsory Third Party Insurance) (Amendment) (Guernsey) Law 1994	
102	24/11/94	Buckingham Palace	Health Service Commissioners Act 1993	The Health Service Commissioner for England (National Blodd Authority) Order 1994	1994/2954
103	24/11/94	Council Chamber Whitehall	Institute of Taxation	Byelaw Amendments	
104	24/11/94	Buckingham Palace	Institute of Taxation	Charter Amendment: Changing name to 'The Chartered Institute of Taxation'	
105	24/11/94	Buckingham Palace	Jersey	Merchandise Marks (Amendment No. 2) (Jersey) Law 1994	
106	24/11/94	Buckingham Palace	Naval and Marine Pay and Pensions Act 1865	Naval and Marine pay and Pensions (Non-Effective Benefits and Family Pensions) Order 1994	
107	24/11/94	Buckingham Palace	Order of Reference	British Bank of the Middle East: Supplemental Charter	
108	24/11/94	Buckingham Palace	Order of Reference	Zoological Society of London: Charter	
109	24/11/94	Buckingham Palace	Privy Counsellor Appointment	Sir Robert Andrew Morritt: Sworn	
110	24/11/94	Buckingham Palace	Privy Counsellor Appointment	Sir Swinton Barclay Thomas; Sworn	
111	24/11/94	Buckingham Palace	Proclamation	Determining the Specifications and Design for Two-Pound Coins Commemorating 50th Anniversary of WWII	
112	24/11/94	Buckingham Palace	Sealing Order	Determining the Specifications and Design for Two-Pound Coins Commemorating 50th Anniversary of WWII	
113	24/11/94	Buckingham Palace	Security Service Act 1989	The Intelligence Services Act 1994 (Channel Islands) Order 1994	1994/2955
114	24/11/94	Buckingham Palace	University of Ulster	Appointment of Rt Hon Robert Erskine as Visitor	
115	07/12/94	Council Chamber Whitehall	Royal Pharmaceutical Society of Great Britain	Amendment to Byelaw XX	
116	11/12/94	Council Chamber Whitehall	Victoria University of Manchester	Statute Amendments	
117	12/12/94	Council Chamber Whitehall	Medical Act 1983	The General Medical Council (Constitution of Fitness to Practise Committees) (Amendment No.2) Rules Order of Council 1994	1994/3171
118	14/12/94	Buckingham Palace	Administration of Justice Act 1968	The Maximum Number of Judges Order 1994	1994/3217
119	14/12/94	Buckingham Palace	Alderney	The Companies (Alderney) Law 1994	
120	14/12/94	Buckingham Palace	Alderney	The Employers' Liability (Compulsory Insurance) (Alderney) Law 1994	
121	14/12/94	Buckingham Palace	British Institute of Florence	Charter Amendments	
122	14/12/94	Council Chamber Whitehall	British Institute of Florence	Statute Amendments	
123	14/12/94	Buckingham Palace	Burial Act 1853	Burials: Notice: 8 Churchyards	
124	14/12/94	Buckingham Palace	Chartered Institution of Water and Environmental Management	Granted Charter of Incorporation	
125	14/12/94	Buckingham Palace	Child Abduction and Custody Act 1985	The Child Abduction and Custody (Parties to Conventions) (Amendment) (No. 6) Order 1994	1994/3201
126	14/12/94	Buckingham Palace	Church Commissioners Schemes	Diocese of Bath and Wells: Yeovil Holy Trinity	
127	14/12/94	Buckingham Palace	Church Commissioners Schemes	Diocese of Blackburn: Saint Luke, Preston	
128	14/12/94	Buckingham Palace	Church Commissioners Schemes	Diocese of Blackburn: Walton-le-Dale, Samlesbury	
129	14/12/94	Buckingham Palace	Church Commissioners Schemes	Diocese of Chelmsford: Earls Colne and White Colne	
130	14/12/94	Buckingham Palace	Church Commissioners Schemes	Diocese of Durham: Barnard Castle with Whorlton	
131	14/12/94	Buckingham Palace	Church Commissioners Schemes	Diocese of Ely: Fordham	
132	14/12/94	Buckingham Palace	Church Commissioners Schemes	Diocese of Exeter: Yarcombe, Membury and Upottery	
133	14/12/94	Buckingham Palace	Church Commissioners Schemes	Diocese of Gloucester: Stratton with Baunton and Daglinworth	
134	14/12/94	Buckingham Palace	Church Commissioners Schemes	Diocese of Hereford: Cleobury mortimer with Hopton Wafers	
135	14/12/94	Buckingham Palace	Church Commissioners Schemes	Diocese of Hereford: Dewsall with Callow	
136	14/12/94	Buckingham Palace	Church Commissioners Schemes	Diocese of Leicester: Norton-by-Twycross	
137	14/12/94	Buckingham Palace	Church Commissioners Schemes	Diocese of Lincoln: Saleby with Beesby	
138	14/12/94	Buckingham Palace	Church Commissioners Schemes	Diocese of Liverpool: Christ Church, Toxteth Park	
139	14/12/94	Buckingham Palace	Church Commissioners Schemes	Diocese of Norfolk: Filby	
140	14/12/94	Buckingham Palace	Church Commissioners Schemes	Diocese of Norfolk: Sandringham	
141	14/12/94	Buckingham Palace	Church Commissioners Schemes	Diocese of Norwich: East and West Rudham	
142	14/12/94	Buckingham Palace	Church Commissioners Schemes	Diocese of Norwich: Mid-Norfolk Group Ministry	
143	14/12/94	Buckingham Palace	Church Commissioners Schemes	Diocese of Norwich: North Pickenham with Haughton on the Hill	
144	14/12/94	Buckingham Palace	Church Commissioners Schemes	Diocese of Norwich: Somerly with Ashby, Fritton and Herring Fleet	
145	14/12/94	Buckingham Palace	Church Commissioners Schemes	Diocese of Oxford: Bracknell	
146	14/12/94	Buckingham Palace	Church Commissioners Schemes	Diocese of Oxford: Oxford Saint Mathew	
147	14/12/94	Buckingham Palace	Church Commissioners Schemes	Diocese of Salisbury: Patney	
148	14/12/94	Buckingham Palace	Church Commissioners Schemes	Diocese of Southwark: Battersea St Bartholomew	
149	14/12/94	Buckingham Palace	Church Commissioners Schemes	Diocese of Southwark: St George the Martyr with St Jude	
150	14/12/94	Buckingham Palace	Church Commissioners Schemes	Diocese of Wakefield: Halifax	
151	14/12/94	Buckingham Palace	Consular Fees Act 1980	The Consular Fees (Amendment) Order 1994	1994/3202
152	14/12/94	Buckingham Palace	Council for the Central Laboratory of the Research Councils	Granted Charter of Incorporation	
153	14/12/94	Buckingham Palace	Extradition Act 1989	The European Convention on Extradition (Amendment) Order 1994	1994/3203
154	14/12/94	Buckingham Palace	Films Act 1985	The European Convention on Cinematographic Co-production (Amendment) (No.2) Order 1994	1994/3218
155	14/12/94	Buckingham Palace	Films Act 1985	The Films Co-production Agreements (Amendment) Order 1994	1994/3222
156	14/12/94	Buckingham Palace	Food and Environment Protection Act 1985	The Food and Environment Protection Act 1985 (Isle of Man) (Revocation) Order 1994	1994/3205
157	14/12/94	Buckingham Palace	Guernsey	The Companies (Guernsey) Law 1994	
158	14/12/94	Buckingham Palace	Hong Kong (Coinage) orders 1936 to 1979	Revocation Order 1994	
159	14/12/94	Buckingham Palace	Income and Corporation Taxes Act 1988	The Double Taxation Relief (Taxes on Income) (Estonia) Order 1994	1994/3207
160	14/12/94	Buckingham Palace	Income and Corporation Taxes Act 1988	The Double Taxation Relief (Taxes on Income) (Guernsey) Order 1994	1994/3209
161	14/12/94	Buckingham Palace	Income and Corporation Taxes Act 1988	The Double Taxation Relief (Taxes on Income) (Isle of Man) Order 1994	1994/3208
162	14/12/94	Buckingham Palace	Income and Corporation Taxes Act 1988	The Double Taxation Relief (Taxes on Income) (Jersey) Order 1994	1994/3210
163	14/12/94	Buckingham Palace	Income and Corporation Taxes Act 1988	The Double Taxation Relief (Taxes on Income) (Kazakhstan) Order 1994	1994/3211
164	14/12/94	Buckingham Palace	Income and Corporation Taxes Act 1988	The Double Taxation Relief (Taxes on Income) (Mexico) Order 1994	1994/3212
165	14/12/94	Buckingham Palace	Income and Corporation Taxes Act 1988	The Double Taxation Relief (Taxes on Income) (Russian Federation) Order 1994	1994/3213
166	14/12/94	Buckingham Palace	Income and Corporation Taxes Act 1988	The Double Taxation Relief (Taxes on Income) (Switzerland) Order 1994	1994/3215
167	14/12/94	Buckingham Palace	Income and Corporation Taxes Act 1988	The Double Taxation Relief (Taxes on Income) (Vietnam) Order 1994	1994/3216
168	14/12/94	Buckingham Palace	Inheritance Tax Act 1984	The Double Taxation Relief (Taxes on Estates of Deceased Persons and Inheritances) (Switzerland) Order 1994	1994/3214
169	14/12/94	Buckingham Palace	Jersey	Computer Misuse (Jersey) Law 1994	
170	14/12/94	Buckingham Palace	Jersey	Loi (1994) (Amendment No.3) sur le College Victoria	
171	14/12/94	Buckingham Palace	Ministerial and other Salaries Act 1975	The Ministerial and other Salaries Order 1994	1994/3206
172	14/12/94	Council Chamber Whitehall	National Society for the Prevention of Cruelty to Children	Bye-Law Amendments	
173	14/12/94	Buckingham Palace	National Society for the Prevention of Cruelty to Children	Charter Amendment	
174	14/12/94	Buckingham Palace	Naval and Marine Pay and Pensions Act 1865	Naval and Marine pay and Pensions (Pay and Allowances) Order 1994	
175	14/12/94	Buckingham Palace	Northern Ireland Act 1974	The Firearms (Amendment) (Northern Ireland) Order 1994	1994/3204
176	14/12/94	Buckingham Palace	Order of Reference	The Master and Wardens of the Art or Mystery of the Girdlers of London: Supplemental Charter	
177	14/12/94	Buckingham Palace	Order of Reference	University of Cambridge: Statute Amendment	
178	14/12/94	Buckingham Palace	Patents Act 1977	The Patents (Convention Countries) Order 1994	1994/3220
179	14/12/94	Council Chamber Whitehall	Pharmacy Act 1954	Royal Pharmaceutical Society of Great Britain: Fees	
180	14/12/94	Buckingham Palace	Registered Designs Act 1949	The Designs (Convention Countries) Order 1994	1994/3219
181	14/12/94	Buckingham Palace	Universities (Scotland) Act 1966	University of Aberdeen: Ordinance	
182	14/12/94	Buckingham Palace	Universities of Oxford and Cambridge Act 1923	Kings College, Cambridge: Amendment of Statute E	
183	14/12/94	Buckingham Palace	Universities of Oxford and Cambridge Act 1923	University of Oxford: Amendment of Statutes VII & XII	
184	14/12/94	Buckingham Palace	University of Wales	Amendments to Supplemental Charter	
185	14/12/94	Council Chamber Whitehall	University of Wales	Statute Amendments	
186	20/12/94	Council Chamber Whitehall	Royal Pharmaceutical Society of Great Britain	Amendment of Byelaws II, XIX & XX	
187	21/12/94	Council Chamber Whitehall	Medical Act 1983	The General Medical Council Preliminary Proceedings Committee and Professional Conduct Committee (Procedure) (Amendment) Rules Order of Council 1994	1994/3298
188	29/12/94	Council Chamber Whitehall	Opticians Act 1989	The General Optical Council (Maximum Penalty) Order of Council 1994	1994/3327
189	04/01/95	Council Chamber Whitehall	Chartered Association of Certified Accountants	Bye-Law Amendments	
190	10/01/95	Council Chamber Whitehall	Architects Registration (Amendment) Act 1969	Architects Registration Council: Fees	
191	10/01/95	Council Chamber Whitehall	Institute of Actuaries	Bye-Law Amendments	
192	10/01/95	Council Chamber Whitehall	Textile Institute	Bye-Law Amendments	
193	26/01/95	Council Chamber Whitehall	Veterinary Surgeons Act 1966	The Veterinary Surgeons and Veterinary Practitioners (Registration) (Amendment) Regulations Order of Council 1995	1994/207
194	27/01/95	Council Chamber Whitehall	Veterinary Surgeons Act 1966	Amendment to the Royal College of Veterinary Surgeons Council Election Scheme 1967	
195	31/01/95	Council Chamber Whitehall	Royal College of Art	Statute Amendments	
196	06/02/95	Council Chamber Whitehall	Poisons Act 1972	Appointment of Mrs Alison Julie Hopkins as an Inspector for the Royal Pharmaceutical Society of Great Britain	
197	08/02/95	Buckingham Palace	Burial Act 1853	Burials: Finals: 9 Churchyards	
198	08/02/95	Buckingham Palace	Burial Act 1853	Burials: Notice: 9 Churchyards	
199	08/02/95	Buckingham Palace	Child Abduction and Custody Act 1985	The Child Abduction and Custody (Parties to Conventions) (Amendment) Order 1995	1995/264
200	08/02/95	Buckingham Palace	Church Commissioners Schemes	Diocese of Bristol: Saint Dunstan, Bedminster	

== 200-301 ==
ID	Date	Venue	Order Name	Order Subject	SI Number
201	08/02/95	Buckingham Palace	Church Commissioners Schemes	Diocese of Chelmsford: Basildon, St Martin of Tours with Holy Cross and Laindon	
202	08/02/95	Buckingham Palace	Church Commissioners Schemes	Diocese of Chelmsford: Loughton, St Mary	
203	08/02/95	Buckingham Palace	Church Commissioners Schemes	Diocese of Chelmsford: St Nicholas, Elm Park, Hornchurch	
204	08/02/95	Buckingham Palace	Church Commissioners Schemes	Diocese of Coventry: Bedworth	
205	08/02/95	Buckingham Palace	Church Commissioners Schemes	Diocese of Ely: Haslingfield	
206	08/02/95	Buckingham Palace	Church Commissioners Schemes	Diocese of Exeter: Emmanuel Compton Gifford	
207	08/02/95	Buckingham Palace	Church Commissioners Schemes	Diocese of Exeter: St Andrew with St Paul and St George, Plymouth	
208	08/02/95	Buckingham Palace	Church Commissioners Schemes	Diocese of Hereford: Saint James, Batestree	
209	08/02/95	Buckingham Palace	Church Commissioners Schemes	Diocese of Lincoln: Barnetby le Wold	
210	08/02/95	Buckingham Palace	Church Commissioners Schemes	Diocese of Lincoln: Saxilby with Ingleby and Broxholme	
211	08/02/95	Buckingham Palace	Church Commissioners Schemes	Diocese of Lincoln: St John the Baptist, Amber Hill	
212	08/02/95	Buckingham Palace	Church Commissioners Schemes	Diocese of London: St Paul, Islington	
213	08/02/95	Buckingham Palace	Church Commissioners Schemes	Diocese of Manchester: Holy Trinity, Bury	
214	08/02/95	Buckingham Palace	Church Commissioners Schemes	Diocese of Manchester: St Andrew, South Levenshulme	
215	08/02/95	Buckingham Palace	Church Commissioners Schemes	Diocese of Norwich: Beetley	
216	08/02/95	Buckingham Palace	Church Commissioners Schemes	Diocese of Norwich: Heacham	
217	08/02/95	Buckingham Palace	Church Commissioners Schemes	Diocese of Norwich: Litcham, Kempston, East and West Lexham	
218	08/02/95	Buckingham Palace	Church Commissioners Schemes	Diocese of Norwich: Twyford, Guist, Bintry, Themelthorpe, Wood Norton, Stibbard	
219	08/02/95	Buckingham Palace	Church Commissioners Schemes	Diocese of Peterborough: Bugbrooke	
220	08/02/95	Buckingham Palace	Church Commissioners Schemes	Diocese of Ripon: Oulton with Woodlesford	
221	08/02/95	Buckingham Palace	Church Commissioners Schemes	Diocese of Salisbury: St Andrew, Rollestone	
222	08/02/95	Buckingham Palace	Church Commissioners Schemes	Diocese of St Albans: Aspenden with Layston	
223	08/02/95	Buckingham Palace	Church Commissioners Schemes	Diocese of Wakefield: The Ascension, Kinsley	
224	08/02/95	Buckingham Palace	Church Commissioners Schemes	Diocese of York: Barlby	
225	08/02/95	Buckingham Palace	Civil Service	Civil Service Commissioners Order in Council 1995	
226	08/02/95	Buckingham Palace	European Communities Act 1972	The European Communities (Definition of Treaties) (The Agreement Establishing the World Trade Organisation) Order 1995	1995/265
227	08/02/95	Buckingham Palace	European Communities Act 1972	The European Communities (Designation) Order 1995	1995/262
228	08/02/95	Buckingham Palace	Guernsey	The Domestic Proceedings and Magistrate's Court (Amendment) (Guernsey) Law 1995	
229	08/02/95	Buckingham Palace	Guernsey	The Income Tax (Emoluments Amendments) (Guernsey) Law 1995	
230	08/02/95	Buckingham Palace	Guernsey	The Tax on Rateable Values (Amendment) (Guernsey) Law 1995	
231	08/02/95	Buckingham Palace	Health and Safety at Work etc. Act 1974	The Health and Safety at Work etc. Act 1974 (Application outside Great Britain) Order 1995	1995/263
232	08/02/95	Buckingham Palace	Institute of Chartered Accountants in England and Wales	Amendment to Supplemental Charter	
233	08/02/95	Buckingham Palace	Institution of Mining Engineers	Supplemental Charter	
234	08/02/95	Buckingham Palace	Jersey	Cheques (Amendment) (Jersey) Law 1995	
235	08/02/95	Buckingham Palace	Jersey	Diseases of Animals (Amendment No.4) (Jersey) Law 1995	
236	08/02/95	Buckingham Palace	Jersey	Franchise (Amendment No.5) (Jersey) Law 1995	
237	08/02/95	Buckingham Palace	Jersey	Inquests and Post-Mortem Examinations (Jersey) Law 1995	
238	08/02/95	Buckingham Palace	Jersey	Motor Traffic (Third Party Insurance) (Amendment No. 9) (Jersey) Law 1995	
239	08/02/95	Buckingham Palace	Jersey	Motor Vehicle Registration (Amendment) (Jersey) Law 1995	
240	08/02/95	Buckingham Palace	Jersey	Parish Rate (Administration) (Amendment No. 6) (Jersey) Law 1995	
241	08/02/95	Buckingham Palace	Jersey	Sexual Offences (Amendment) (Jersey) Law 1995	
242	08/02/95	Buckingham Palace	Ministers of the Crown Act 1975	The Transfer of Functions (Treasury and Minister for the Civil Service) Order 1995	1995/269
243	08/02/95	Buckingham Palace	Mothers Union	Amendment to Supplemental Charter	
244	08/02/95	Buckingham Palace	Naval and Marine Pay and Pensions Act 1865	Naval and Marine pay and Pensions (Minimum Pension Provisions) (Amendment) Order 1995	
245	08/02/95	Buckingham Palace	Naval and Marine Pay and Pensions Act 1865	Naval and Marine Pay and Pensions (Pay and Allowances) (Amendment) Order 1995	
246	08/02/95	Buckingham Palace	Privy Counsellor Appointment	Geoffrey Denis Erskine: Sworn	
247	08/02/95	Buckingham Palace	Privy Counsellor Appointment	Michael Bruce Forsyth: Sworn	
248	08/02/95	Buckingham Palace	Privy Counsellor Appointment	Sir Malcolm Thomas Pill: Sworn	
249	08/02/95	Buckingham Palace	Privy Counsellor Appointment	Sir Philip Howard Otton: Sworn	
250	08/02/95	Buckingham Palace	Privy Counsellor Appointment	Sir Robin Ernest Auld: Sworn	
251	08/02/95	Buckingham Palace	Privy Counsellor Appointment	Timothy Crommelin Eggar: Appointed	
252	08/02/95	Buckingham Palace	Proclamation	Determining the Specifications and Design for Two-Pound Coins Commemorating 50th Anniversary of the Establishment of the United Nations	
253	08/02/95	Buckingham Palace	Public Health (Control of Disease) Act 1984	The Public Health (Ships and Aircraft) (Isle of Man) (Revocation) Order 1995	1995/267
254	08/02/95	Buckingham Palace	Royal Hospital and Home, Putney	Charter Amendment	
255	08/02/95	Buckingham Palace	Science and Technology Act 1965	The Council for the Central Laboratory of the Research Councils Order 1995	1995/261
256	08/02/95	Buckingham Palace	Sealing Order	Determining the Specifications and Design for Two-Pound Coins Commemorating 50th Anniversary of the Establishment of the United Nations	
257	08/02/95	Buckingham Palace	Universities of Oxford and Cambridge Act 1923	All Souls' College, Oxford: Amendment of Statute VI	
258	08/02/95	Buckingham Palace	Universities of Oxford and Cambridge Act 1923	Christ's College, Cambridge: Amendment of Statute C	
259	08/02/95	Buckingham Palace	Universities of Oxford and Cambridge Act 1923	University of Cambridge: Statute Amendment	
260	08/02/95	Buckingham Palace	Universities of Oxford and Cambridge Act 1923	University of Oxford: Amendment of Statutes II & III	
261	08/02/95	Buckingham Palace	University of Bradford	Amendment of Charter	
262	08/02/95	Buckingham Palace	University of London	Appeal to Visitor by Mr Jeffrey Fryer - Refused	
263	08/02/95	Buckingham Palace	Wireless Telegraphy Act 1949	The Wireless Telegraphy (Isle of Man) Order 1995	1995/268
264	08/02/95	Buckingham Palace	Worshipful Company of Sadlers	Supplemental Charter	
265	15/03/95	Buckingham Palace	Art or Mystery of the Girdlers of London	Supplemental Charter	
266	15/03/95	Buckingham Palace	Burial Act 1853	Burials: Finals: 8 Churchyards	
267	15/03/95	Buckingham Palace	Burial Act 1853	Burials: Notice: St John the Baptist, Horrabridge, Devon	
268	15/03/95	Buckingham Palace	Church Commissioners Schemes	Diocese of Bath and Wells: Christ Church, Rode Hill	
269	15/03/95	Buckingham Palace	Church Commissioners Schemes	Diocese of Bath and Wells: St Lawrence, Woolverton	
270	15/03/95	Buckingham Palace	Church Commissioners Schemes	Diocese of Blackburn: Great Marsden	
271	15/03/95	Buckingham Palace	Church Commissioners Schemes	Diocese of Bristol: Locklease, Bristol	
272	15/03/95	Buckingham Palace	Church Commissioners Schemes	Diocese of Chichester: St Luke, Stone Cross with North Langney	
273	15/03/95	Buckingham Palace	Church Commissioners Schemes	Diocese of Derby: Matlock, Bath	
274	15/03/95	Buckingham Palace	Church Commissioners Schemes	Diocese of Gloucester: Aylburton	
275	15/03/95	Buckingham Palace	Church Commissioners Schemes	Diocese of Gloucester: St Mary de Crypt	
276	15/03/95	Buckingham Palace	Church Commissioners Schemes	Diocese of Lichfield: Clifton Campville with Chilcote	
277	15/03/95	Buckingham Palace	Church Commissioners Schemes	Diocese of Lichfield: Thorpe Constantine	
278	15/03/95	Buckingham Palace	Church Commissioners Schemes	Diocese of Lichfield: Tilstock	
279	15/03/95	Buckingham Palace	Church Commissioners Schemes	Diocese of Lincoln: Barrowby	
280	15/03/95	Buckingham Palace	Church Commissioners Schemes	Diocese of Lincoln: Brothertoft	
281	15/03/95	Buckingham Palace	Church Commissioners Schemes	Diocese of Lincoln: Holy Trinity, Chapel Hill	
282	15/03/95	Buckingham Palace	Church Commissioners Schemes	Diocese of Lincoln: Longtoft and Baston	
283	15/03/95	Buckingham Palace	Church Commissioners Schemes	Diocese of Newcastle: St Mark Byker	
284	15/03/95	Buckingham Palace	Church Commissioners Schemes	Diocese of Norwich: Sea Palling with Waxham	
285	15/03/95	Buckingham Palace	Church Commissioners Schemes	Diocese of Ripon: Leeds St Margaret	
286	15/03/95	Buckingham Palace	Church Commissioners Schemes	Diocese of Salisbury: East Knoyle, Semley and Sedgehill	
287	15/03/95	Buckingham Palace	Church Commissioners Schemes	Diocese of Sheffield: Netherthorpe	
288	15/03/95	Buckingham Palace	Church Commissioners Schemes	Diocese of St Edmundsbury and Ipswich: Bramford	
289	15/03/95	Buckingham Palace	Church Commissioners Schemes	Diocese of Truro: St Mary	
290	15/03/95	Buckingham Palace	Church Commissioners Schemes	Diocese of Wakefield: Halifax	
291	15/03/95	Buckingham Palace	Church Commissioners Schemes	Diocese of Winchester: Hursley and Ampfield	
292	15/03/95	Buckingham Palace	Civil Service	Civil Service Commissioners (No.2) Order in Council 1995	
293	15/03/95	Buckingham Palace	Civil Service	Civil Service Order in Council 1995	
294	15/03/95	Buckingham Palace	European Communities Act 1972	The European Communities (Designation) (No. 2) Order 1995	1995/751
295	15/03/95	Council Chamber Whitehall	Further and Higher Education Act 1992	Power to Award Degrees etc. (Gwent College of Higher Education) Order of Council 1995	
296	15/03/95	Council Chamber Whitehall	Further and Higher Education Act 1992	Power to Award Degrees etc. (Royal Agricultural College) Order of Council 1995	
297	15/03/95	Buckingham Palace	Health Service Commissioners Act 1993	The Health Service Commissioner (Family Health Services Appeal Authority) Order 1995	1995/753
298	15/03/95	Buckingham Palace	Income and Corporation Taxes Act 1988	The Double Taxation Relief (Taxes on Income) (Azerbaijan) Order 1995	1995/762
299	15/03/95	Buckingham Palace	Income and Corporation Taxes Act 1988	The Double Taxation Relief (Taxes on Income) (Malta) Order 1995	1995/763
300	15/03/95	Buckingham Palace	Income and Corporation Taxes Act 1988	The Double Taxation Relief (Taxes on Income) (Republic of Ireland) Order 1995	1995/764

== 301-400 ==
ID	Date	Venue	Order Name	Order Subject	SI Number
301	15/03/95	Buckingham Palace	Income and Corporation Taxes Act 1988	The Double Taxation Relief (Taxes on Income) (Spain) Order 1995	1995/765
302	15/03/95	Buckingham Palace	Intelligence Services Act 1994	The Intelligence Services Act 1994 (Dependent Territories) Order 1995	1995/752
303	15/03/95	Buckingham Palace	Jersey	European Economic Area (Jersey) Law 1995	
304	15/03/95	Buckingham Palace	Jersey	Loi (1995) (Amendment) sur la Voirie	
305	15/03/95	Buckingham Palace	Naval and Marine Pay and Pensions Act 1865	Naval, Military and Air Forces etc. (Disablement and Death) Service Pensions Order 1995	1995/766
306	15/03/95	Buckingham Palace	Northern Ireland Act 1974	The Appropriation (Northern Ireland) Order 1995	1995/754
307	15/03/95	Buckingham Palace	Northern Ireland Act 1974	The Children (Northern Ireland Consequential Amendments) Order 1995	1995/756
308	15/03/95	Buckingham Palace	Northern Ireland Act 1974	The Children (Northern Ireland) Order 1995	1995/755
309	15/03/95	Buckingham Palace	Northern Ireland Act 1974	The Children's Evidence (Northern Ireland) Order 1995	1995/757
310	15/03/95	Buckingham Palace	Northern Ireland Act 1974	The Fair Employment (Amendment) (Northern Ireland) Order 1995	1995/758
311	15/03/95	Buckingham Palace	Northern Ireland Act 1974	The Local Government (Miscellaneous Provisions) (Northern Ireland) Order 1995	1995/759
312	15/03/95	Buckingham Palace	Northern Ireland Act 1974	The Wildlife (Amendment) (Northern Ireland) order 1995	1995/761
313	15/03/95	Buckingham Palace	Order of Reference	British School at Rome: Supplemental Charter	
314	15/03/95	Buckingham Palace	Order of Reference	Manchester College, Oxford: Charter under title of 'The Principal and Fellows of the Manchester Academy and Harris College in the University of Oxford'	
315	15/03/95	Buckingham Palace	Prevention of Terrorism (Temporary Provisions) At 1989	The Prevention of Terrorism (Temporary Provisions) Act 1989 (Enforcement of External Orders) Order 1995	1995/760
316	15/03/95	Buckingham Palace	Privy Counsellor Appointment	Sir Alan Hylton Ward: Sworn	
317	15/03/95	Buckingham Palace	Privy Counsellor Appointment	Sir Michael Hutchison: Sworn	
318	15/03/95	Buckingham Palace	Privy Counsellor Appointment	Sir William Aldous: Appointed	
319	15/03/95	Buckingham Palace	Privy Counsellor Appointment	Timothy Crommelin Eggar: Sworn	
320	15/03/95	Buckingham Palace	Social Security Administration Act 1992	The Social Security (Reciprocal Agreements) Order 1995	1995/767
321	15/03/95	Buckingham Palace	Trustee Investments Act 1961	The Trustee Investments (Additional Powers) Order 1995	1995/768
322	15/03/95	Buckingham Palace	Universities of Oxford and Cambridge Act 1877	Appointment of Donald James to Universities Committee of Privy Council	
323	15/03/95	Buckingham Palace	University of Aberdeen	Ordinance 130	
324	15/03/95	Buckingham Palace	University of Edinburgh	Ordinance 191	
325	15/03/95	Buckingham Palace	Zoological Society of London	New Charter	
326	11/04/95	Windsor Castle	Antarctic Act 1994	The Antarctic Act 1994 (Guernsey) Order 1995	1995/1033
327	11/04/95	Windsor Castle	Antarctic Act 1994	The Antarctic Act 1994 (Isle of Man) Order 1995	1995/1035
328	11/04/95	Windsor Castle	Antarctic Act 1994	The Antarctic Act 1994 (Jersey) Order 1995	1995/1034
329	11/04/95	Windsor Castle	Burial Act 1853	Burials: Notices: Extension to 2 Churchyards	
330	11/04/95	Windsor Castle	Child Abduction and Custody Act 1985	The Child Abduction and Custody (Parties to Conventions) (Amendment) (No.2) Order 1995	1995/1031
331	11/04/95	Windsor Castle	Church Commissioners Schemes	Diocese of Bath and Wells: St Thomas a Becket, Pensford	
332	11/04/95	Windsor Castle	Church Commissioners Schemes	Diocese of Chelmsford: Coopersale	
333	11/04/95	Windsor Castle	Church Commissioners Schemes	Diocese of Chelmsford: Goldhanger	
334	11/04/95	Windsor Castle	Church Commissioners Schemes	Diocese of Chelmsford: St Martin, Colchester	
335	11/04/95	Windsor Castle	Church Commissioners Schemes	Diocese of Derby: Holy Trinity, Chesterfield	
336	11/04/95	Windsor Castle	Church Commissioners Schemes	Diocese of Derby: St Chad, Mill Hill	
337	11/04/95	Windsor Castle	Church Commissioners Schemes	Diocese of Guildford: Christ Church, Epsom Common	
338	11/04/95	Windsor Castle	Church Commissioners Schemes	Diocese of Lincoln: Frampton	
339	11/04/95	Windsor Castle	Church Commissioners Schemes	Diocese of Lincoln: St Swithin, Lincoln	
340	11/04/95	Windsor Castle	Church Commissioners Schemes	Diocese of Manchester: St Albon, Cheetwood	
341	11/04/95	Windsor Castle	Church Commissioners Schemes	Diocese of Manchester: St Luke Cheetham	
342	11/04/95	Windsor Castle	Church Commissioners Schemes	Diocese of Norwich: Gaywood St Faith	
343	11/04/95	Windsor Castle	Church Commissioners Schemes	Diocese of Norwich: Hunstanton St Mary with Ringstead Parva	
344	11/04/95	Windsor Castle	Church Commissioners Schemes	Diocese of Norwich: Lowestoft St Margaret	
345	11/04/95	Windsor Castle	Church Commissioners Schemes	Diocese of Oxford: All Saints, Shipburn	
346	11/04/95	Windsor Castle	Church Commissioners Schemes	Diocese of Peterborough: Woodford Halse with Ebdon	
347	11/04/95	Windsor Castle	Church Commissioners Schemes	Diocese of Sheffield: Thrybergh with Hooten Roberts	
348	11/04/95	Windsor Castle	Church Commissioners Schemes	Diocese of Southwark: St Anne and St Augustine, Bermondsey	
349	11/04/95	Windsor Castle	Church Commissioners Schemes	Diocese of Southwark: Walworth	
350	11/04/95	Windsor Castle	Church Commissioners Schemes	Diocese of Worcester: Sedgley	
351	11/04/95	Windsor Castle	Cranfield University	Appointment of Duke of Kent as Visitor	
352	11/04/95	Windsor Castle	European Communities Act 1972	The Air Navigation Order 1995	1995/1038
353	11/04/95	Windsor Castle	Foreign Jurisdiction Act 1890	The Antarctic Act 1994 (Overseas Territories) Order 1995	1995/1030
354	11/04/95	Windsor Castle	Guernsey	Raymond Heaume Resigns from Office of Jure-Justicier	
355	11/04/95	Windsor Castle	Guernsey	The Money Laundering (Disclosure of Information) (Guernsey) Law 1995	
356	11/04/95	Windsor Castle	Guernsey	The Powers of Attorney and Affidavits (Bailiwick of Guernsey) Law 1995	
357	11/04/95	Windsor Castle	Guernsey	The Social Insurance (Amendment) (Guernsey) Law 1995	
358	11/04/95	Windsor Castle	Jersey	Companies (Amendment No.2) (Jersey) Law 1995	
359	11/04/95	Windsor Castle	Mansfield College, Oxford	Charter of Incorporation	
360	11/04/95	Council Chamber Whitehall	Marlborough College	Bye-Law Amendments	
361	11/04/95	Windsor Castle	Parliamentary Constituencies Act 1986	The Parliamentary Constituencies (Scotland) Order 1995	1995/1037
362	11/04/95	Windsor Castle	Parliamentary Constituencies Act 1986	The Parliamentary Constituencies (Wales) Order 1995	1995/1036
363	11/04/95	Windsor Castle	Royal British Legion	Alteration to 1993 Supplemental Charter	
364	11/04/95	Council Chamber Whitehall	Royal British Legion	Alterations to Rules	
365	11/04/95	Windsor Castle	Templeton College, Oxford	Charter of Incorporation	
366	11/04/95	Windsor Castle	United Nations Act 1946	The United Nations Arms Embargoes (Dependent Territories) Order 1995	1995/1032
367	11/04/95	Windsor Castle	Universities of Oxford and Cambridge Act 1923	University of Oxford: Amendment of Statutes II, III & XV	
368	19/04/95	Council Chamber Whitehall	Animal Health Trust	Alterations to Rules	
369	25/04/95	Council Chamber Whitehall	Royal Pharmaceutical Society of Great Britain	Fees for Chairman and Statutory Committee	
370	01/05/95	Council Chamber Whitehall	Royal Pharmaceutical Society of Great Britain	Byelaw Amendments	
371	01/05/95	Council Chamber Whitehall	University of Stirling	Statute Amendments	
372	11/05/95	Windsor Castle	Marlborough College	Charter Amendments	
373	12/05/95	Council Chamber Whitehall	University College of Swansea	Statute Amendments	
374	17/05/95	Buckingham Palace	British Bank of the Middle East	Supplemental Charter	
375	17/05/95	Buckingham Palace	Burial Act 1853	Burials: Finals: 9 Churchyards	
376	17/05/95	Buckingham Palace	Carriage by Air Act 1961	The Civil Aviation (Isle of Man) (Revocation) Order 1995	1995/1297
377	17/05/95	Buckingham Palace	Child Abduction and Custody Act 1985	The Child Abduction and Custody (Parties to Conventions) (Amendment) (No.3) Order 1995	1995/1295
378	17/05/95	Buckingham Palace	Church Commissioners Schemes	Diocese of Bath and Wells: East Clevedon and Clapton-in-Gordano	
379	17/05/95	Buckingham Palace	Church Commissioners Schemes	Diocese of Bristol: Draycot Cerne	
380	17/05/95	Buckingham Palace	Church Commissioners Schemes	Diocese of Carlisle: Crosscrake and Preston Patrick	
381	17/05/95	Buckingham Palace	Church Commissioners Schemes	Diocese of Chelmsford: Sible Hedingham and Castle Hedingham	
382	17/05/95	Buckingham Palace	Church Commissioners Schemes	Diocese of Chester: Weston Point	
383	17/05/95	Buckingham Palace	Church Commissioners Schemes	Diocese of Durham: All Saints, New Shildon	
384	17/05/95	Buckingham Palace	Church Commissioners Schemes	Diocese of Ely: St James Marshland	
385	17/05/95	Buckingham Palace	Church Commissioners Schemes	Diocese of Exeter: Butterleigh	
386	17/05/95	Buckingham Palace	Church Commissioners Schemes	Diocese of Exeter: Modbury	
387	17/05/95	Buckingham Palace	Church Commissioners Schemes	Diocese of Hereford: Wigmore Abbey	
388	17/05/95	Buckingham Palace	Church Commissioners Schemes	Diocese of Lichfield: Cheswardine	
389	17/05/95	Buckingham Palace	Church Commissioners Schemes	Diocese of Lincoln: Withern and Reston	
390	17/05/95	Buckingham Palace	Church Commissioners Schemes	Diocese of Norwich: St Andrew Frenze	
391	17/05/95	Buckingham Palace	Church Commissioners Schemes	Diocese of Oxford: Marston and Elsfield	
392	17/05/95	Buckingham Palace	Church Commissioners Schemes	Diocese of Oxford: Wantage Union Chapel	
393	17/05/95	Buckingham Palace	Church Commissioners Schemes	Diocese of Peterborough: St John the Baptist Plumpton	
394	17/05/95	Buckingham Palace	Church Commissioners Schemes	Diocese of Southwell: Mansfield, Oak Tree Lane	
395	17/05/95	Buckingham Palace	Civil Aviation Act 1982	The Air Navigation (Isle of Man) (Revocation) Order 1995	1995/1296
396	17/05/95	Buckingham Palace	Films Act 1985	The European Convention on Cinematographic Co-production (Amendment) Order 1995	1995/1298
397	17/05/95	Council Chamber Whitehall	Further and Higher Education Act 1992	Power to Award Degrees etc. (Buckinghamshire College of Higher Education) Order of Council 1995	
398	17/05/95	Buckingham Palace	Guernsey	Petition - Parish of St Martins	
399	17/05/95	Buckingham Palace	Hovercraft Act 1968	The Hovercraft (Application of Enactments) (Amendment) Order 1995	1995/1299
400	17/05/95	Buckingham Palace	Jersey	Adoption (Amendment No. 3) (Jersey) Law 1995	

== 401-500 ==
ID	Date	Venue	Order Name	Order Subject	SI Number
401	17/05/95	Buckingham Palace	Jersey	Compulsory Purchase of Land (Procedure) (Amendment No. 6) (Jersey) Law 1995	
402	17/05/95	Buckingham Palace	Jersey	Finance (Jersey) Law 1995	
403	17/05/95	Buckingham Palace	Jersey	Parish Rate (Jersey) Law 1995	
404	17/05/95	Buckingham Palace	Privy Counsellor Appointment	Sir James Nicholson: Sworn	
405	17/05/95	Buckingham Palace	Privy Counsellor Appointment	Sir Konrad Schiemann: Sworn	
406	17/05/95	Buckingham Palace	Privy Counsellor Appointment	Sir William Aldous: Sworn	
407	17/05/95	Buckingham Palace	Royal Provident Fund for Sea Fishermen	Surrender of Charter	
408	17/05/95	Council Chamber Whitehall	Royal Town Planning Institute	Byelaw Amendments	
409	17/05/95	Buckingham Palace	Royal Town Planning Institute	Charter Amendments	
410	17/05/95	Buckingham Palace	Universities of Oxford and Cambridge Act 1923	Trinity College, Oxford: Statutes I, II, VIII	
411	17/05/95	Buckingham Palace	Universities of Oxford and Cambridge Act 1923	University of Cambridge: Statute Amendment	
412	17/05/95	Buckingham Palace	Universities of Oxford and Cambridge Act 1923	University of Oxford: Statute VIII	
413	28/05/95	Council Chamber Whitehall	Mothers Union	Bye-Law Amendments	
414	06/06/95	Council Chamber Whitehall	City of London Solicitors' Company	Bye-Law Amendments	
415	09/06/95	Council Chamber Whitehall	Royal College of Pathologists	Amendments to Ordinances	
416	15/06/95	Council Chamber Whitehall	Royal Veterinary College	Appointment of Lord Prior to the Council	
417	16/06/95	Council Chamber Whitehall	Chartered Institute of Public Finance and Accountancy	Bye-Law Amendments	
418	19/06/95	Council Chamber Whitehall	Royal Institution of Chartered Surveyors	Bye-Law Amendments	
419	27/06/95	Council Chamber Whitehall	Royal Pharmaceutical Society of Great Britain	Appointment of Lady Trafford to Council	
420	28/06/95	Buckingham Palace	British College of Optometrists	The College of Optometrists: grant of Charter of Incorporation	
421	28/06/95	Buckingham Palace	British Settlements Act 1887 & 1945	The South Georgia and South Sandwich Islands (Amendment) Order 1995	1995/1621
422	28/06/95	Buckingham Palace	Burial Act 1853	Burials: Finals: 3 Churchyards	
423	28/06/95	Buckingham Palace	Child Abduction and Custody Act 1985	The Child Abduction and Custody (Parties to Conventions) (Amendment) (No.4) Order 1995	1995/1616
424	28/06/95	Buckingham Palace	Church Commissioners Schemes	Diocese of Bath and Wells: All Saints Langport	
425	28/06/95	Buckingham Palace	Church Commissioners Schemes	Diocese of Bath and Wells: Selworthy etc.	
426	28/06/95	Buckingham Palace	Church Commissioners Schemes	Diocese of Bath and Wells: Spaxton and Goathurst	
427	28/06/95	Buckingham Palace	Church Commissioners Schemes	Diocese of Canterbury: Ashford Sth St Francis	
428	28/06/95	Buckingham Palace	Church Commissioners Schemes	Diocese of Carlisle: St John Windemere	
429	28/06/95	Buckingham Palace	Church Commissioners Schemes	Diocese of Chelmsford: Beacontree Sth	
430	28/06/95	Buckingham Palace	Church Commissioners Schemes	Diocese of Chelmsford: St John, Walthamstow	
431	28/06/95	Buckingham Palace	Church Commissioners Schemes	Diocese of Chelmsford: St Luke	
432	28/06/95	Buckingham Palace	Church Commissioners Schemes	Diocese of Durham: Bearpark & Ushaw Moor	
433	28/06/95	Buckingham Palace	Church Commissioners Schemes	Diocese of Durham: Fir Tree	
434	28/06/95	Buckingham Palace	Church Commissioners Schemes	Diocese of Durham: Group Ministry	
435	28/06/95	Buckingham Palace	Church Commissioners Schemes	Diocese of Exeter: Warkleigh & Satterleigh	
436	28/06/95	Buckingham Palace	Church Commissioners Schemes	Diocese of Leicester: Resurrection	
437	28/06/95	Buckingham Palace	Church Commissioners Schemes	Diocese of Manchester: Holy Angels	
438	28/06/95	Buckingham Palace	Church Commissioners Schemes	Diocese of Manchester: Holy Trinity, Bolton	
439	28/06/95	Buckingham Palace	Church Commissioners Schemes	Diocese of Manchester: St Edmund, Whalley Range	
440	28/06/95	Buckingham Palace	Church Commissioners Schemes	Diocese of Norwich: East and West Bradenham	
441	28/06/95	Buckingham Palace	Church Commissioners Schemes	Diocese of Oxford: Shill Valley and Broadshire	
442	28/06/95	Buckingham Palace	Church Commissioners Schemes	Diocese of Oxford: Stubbings	
443	28/06/95	Buckingham Palace	Church Commissioners Schemes	Diocese of Peterborough: Maxey	
444	28/06/95	Buckingham Palace	College of Optometrists	Charter of Incorporation	
445	28/06/95	Buckingham Palace	Consular Fees Act 1980	The Consular Fees Order 1995	1995/1617
446	28/06/95	Buckingham Palace	Convocations	Calling Together New Convocations for the Provinces of Canterbury and York	
447	28/06/95	Buckingham Palace	Convocations	Dissolving Convocations of the Provinces of Canterbury and York	
448	28/06/95	Buckingham Palace	Education (Schools) Act 1992	The Education (Inspectors of Schools in Wales) Order 1995	1995/1628
449	28/06/95	Buckingham Palace	Education (Scotland) Act 1980	Appointment of Anne Capanni & Kenneth Muir as Inspectors of Schools	
450	28/06/95	Buckingham Palace	European Communities Act 1972	The European Communities (Definition of Treaties) (Partnership and Co-operation Agreement between the European Communities and their Member States and the Russian Federation) Order 1995	1995/1618
451	28/06/95	Buckingham Palace	European Communities Act 1972	The European Communities (Definition of Treaties) (Partnership and Co-operation Agreement between the European Communities and their Member States and the Ukraine) Order 1995	1995/1619
452	28/06/95	Buckingham Palace	Extradition Act 1989	The European Convention on Extradition Order 1990 (Amendment) Order 1995	1995/1624
453	28/06/95	Buckingham Palace	Extradition Act 1989	The Extradition (Drug Taking) (Falkland Islands and Gibraltar) Order 1995	1995/1620
454	28/06/95	Buckingham Palace	Gibraltar Constitution Order 1969	The Gibraltar (Criminal Justice (Administration) Ordinance) Order 1995	
455	28/06/95	Buckingham Palace	Guernsey	Powers of Attorney (Jersey) Law 1995	
456	28/06/95	Buckingham Palace	Guernsey	The Income Tax (International Bodies) (Guernsey) law 1995	
457	28/06/95	Buckingham Palace	Guernsey	The Partnership (Guernsey) Law 1995	
458	28/06/95	Buckingham Palace	Imperial College of Science, Technology and Medicine	Charter Amendments	
459	28/06/95	Buckingham Palace	Jersey	Bankruptcy (Desastre) (Amendment) (Jersey) Law 1995	
460	28/06/95	Buckingham Palace	Jersey	Loi (1995) sur la Cour pour le recouvrement de menues dettes	
461	28/06/95	Buckingham Palace	Letters Patent	The Hong Kong Letters Patent 1995	
462	28/06/95	Buckingham Palace	Mothers Union	Amendments to Supplemental Charter	
463	28/06/95	Buckingham Palace	Northern Ireland Act 1974	The Armagh Observatory and Planetarium (Northern Ireland) Order 1995	1995/1622
464	28/06/95	Buckingham Palace	Northern Ireland Act 1974	The Arts Council (Northern Ireland) Order 1995	1995/1623
465	28/06/95	Buckingham Palace	Northern Ireland Act 1974	The Historic Monuments and Archaeological Objects (Northern Ireland) Order 1995	1995/1625
466	28/06/95	Buckingham Palace	Northern Ireland Act 1974	The Ports (Amendment) (Northern Ireland) Order 1995	1995/1627
467	28/06/95	Buckingham Palace	Order of Reference	Royal Institution of Naval Architects: Supplemental Charter	
468	28/06/95	Buckingham Palace	Order of Reference	The Royal Faculty of Procurators in Glasgow: Supplementary Charter	
469	28/06/95	Buckingham Palace	Parliamentary Commissioner Act 1967	The Parliamentary Commissioner Order 1995	1995/1615
470	28/06/95	Buckingham Palace	Parliamentary Constituencies Act 1986	The Parliamentary Constituencies (England) Order 1995	1995/1626
471	28/06/95	Buckingham Palace	Privy Counsellor Appointment	Baron Strathclyde: Sworn	
472	28/06/95	Buckingham Palace	Privy Counsellor Appointment	David Maclean: Sworn	
473	28/06/95	Buckingham Palace	Privy Counsellor Appointment	Robert Atkins: Sworn	
474	28/06/95	Buckingham Palace	Proclamation	Appointing Monday 1 January, Monday 6 May 1996 as Bank Holidays in England, Wales & NI; Appointing Tuesday 26 December and Monday 27 May as Bank Holidays in Scotland	
475	28/06/95	Buckingham Palace	Royal Institution of Chartered Surveyors	Amendments to Supplemental Charter	
476	28/06/95	Buckingham Palace	Royal Postgraduate Medical School	Appointment of Lord Justice Bingham as Visitor	
477	28/06/95	Buckingham Palace	Sealing Order	Bank Holidays 1995/1996	
478	28/06/95	Buckingham Palace	Universities of Oxford and Cambridge Act 1923	Christ's College, Cambridge: Amendment of Statute E	
479	28/06/95	Buckingham Palace	Universities of Oxford and Cambridge Act 1923	Exeter College, Oxford: Amendment of Statutes III, VI and IX	
480	28/06/95	Buckingham Palace	Universities of Oxford and Cambridge Act 1923	University of Cambridge: Statute Amendment	
481	28/06/95	Buckingham Palace	Universities of Oxford and Cambridge Act 1923	University of Oxford: Amendment of Statute XV	
482	28/06/95	Buckingham Palace	University of Glasgow	Ordinance 199	
483	10/07/95	Buckingham Palace	Ministerial Appointment	Douglas Hogg: Sworn Minister of Agriculture Fisheries and Food	
484	10/07/95	Buckingham Palace	Ministerial Appointment	Gillian Shepherd: Sworn Secretary of State for Education and Employment	
485	10/07/95	Buckingham Palace	Ministerial Appointment	Ian Lang: Appointed President of the Board of Trade	
486	10/07/95	Buckingham Palace	Ministerial Appointment	Ian Lang: Sworn Secretary of State for Trade and Industry	
487	10/07/95	Buckingham Palace	Ministerial Appointment	Malcolm Rifkind: Sworn Secretary of State, Foreign Affairs	
488	10/07/95	Buckingham Palace	Ministerial Appointment	Michael Forsyth: Sworn Secretary of State	
489	10/07/95	Buckingham Palace	Ministerial Appointment	Michael Heseltine: Sworn Deputy Prime Minister	
490	10/07/95	Buckingham Palace	Ministerial Appointment	Michael Portillo: Sworn Secretary of State for Defence	
491	10/07/95	Buckingham Palace	Ministerial Appointment	Roger Freeman: Chancellor of Duchy of Lancaster	
492	10/07/95	Buckingham Palace	Ministerial Appointment	Sir George Young; Sworn Secretary of State	
493	10/07/95	Buckingham Palace	Ministerial Appointment	Stephen Dorrell: Sworn Secretary of State	
494	10/07/95	Buckingham Palace	Ministerial Appointment	Virginia Bottomley: Sworn Secretary of State for National Heritage	
495	10/07/95	Buckingham Palace	Ministerial Appointment	William Hague: Sworn Secretary of State for Wales	
496	10/07/95	Buckingham Palace	Privy Counsellor Appointment	Gregory Knight: Sworn	
497	10/07/95	Buckingham Palace	Privy Counsellor Appointment	Hector Monro: Sworn	
498	10/07/95	Buckingham Palace	Privy Counsellor Appointment	William Hague: Sworn	
499	13/07/95	Council Chamber Whitehall	Education Reform Act 1988	Falmouth School of Art and Design: Instrument of Government	
500	13/07/95	Council Chamber Whitehall	Education Reform Act 1988	Surrey Institute of Art and Design; Instrument of Government	

== 501 to 600 ==
ID	Date	Venue	Order Name	Order Subject	SI Number
501	26/07/95	Buckingham Palace	Alderney	The Government of Alderney (Amendment) (No.1) Law 1995	
502	26/07/95	Buckingham Palace	All Souls College, Oxford	The University Commissioners (Statute Modifications) (All Souls College, Oxford) Order 1995	1995/1808
503	26/07/95	Buckingham Palace	Armed Forces Act 1991	The Army, Air Force and Naval Discipline Acts (Continuation) Order 1995	1995/1964
504	26/07/95	Buckingham Palace	Balliol College, Oxford	The University Commissioners (Statute Modifications) (Balliol College, Oxford) Order 1995	1995/1809
505	26/07/95	Buckingham Palace	Brasenose College, Oxford	The University Commissioners (Statute Modifications) (Brasenose College, Oxford) Order 1995	1995/1810
506	26/07/95	Buckingham Palace	British Broadcasting Corporation	Appointment of Lord Nicholas Charles Gordon Lennox as Governor	
507	26/07/95	Council Chamber Whitehall	Chartered Institute of Marketing	Bye-Law Amendments	
508	26/07/95	Buckingham Palace	Chartered Institute of Marketing	Charter Amendments	
509	26/07/95	Buckingham Palace	Christ Church, Oxford	The University Commissioners (Statute Modifications) (Christ Church, Oxford) Order 1995	1995/1812
510	26/07/95	Buckingham Palace	Christs College, Cambridge	The University Commissioners (Statute Modifications) (Christ's College, Cambridge) Order 1995	1995/1842
511	26/07/95	Buckingham Palace	Church Commissioners Schemes	Diocese of Bristol: St Michael and All Angels Bedminster	
512	26/07/95	Buckingham Palace	Church Commissioners Schemes	Diocese of Bristol: St Michael and All Angels Bishopston	
513	26/07/95	Buckingham Palace	Church Commissioners Schemes	Diocese of Bristol; Holy Cross, Inns Court	
514	26/07/95	Buckingham Palace	Church Commissioners Schemes	Diocese of Carlisle: Colton with Satterthwaite and Rusland	
515	26/07/95	Buckingham Palace	Church Commissioners Schemes	Diocese of Chichester: Chailey	
516	26/07/95	Buckingham Palace	Church Commissioners Schemes	Diocese of Chichester: Chichester St Wilfrid	
517	26/07/95	Buckingham Palace	Church Commissioners Schemes	Diocese of Chichester: Dartford	
518	26/07/95	Buckingham Palace	Church Commissioners Schemes	Diocese of Durham: Stockton Holy Trinity	
519	26/07/95	Buckingham Palace	Church Commissioners Schemes	Diocese of Ely: Whiltlesey and Pondersbridge	
520	26/07/95	Buckingham Palace	Church Commissioners Schemes	Diocese of Exeter: Central Exeter	
521	26/07/95	Buckingham Palace	Church Commissioners Schemes	Diocese of Exeter: Princetown with Postbridge and Huccaby	
522	26/07/95	Buckingham Palace	Church Commissioners Schemes	Diocese of Exeter: St Augustine, Plymouth	
523	26/07/95	Buckingham Palace	Church Commissioners Schemes	Diocese of Gloucester: Badgeworth, Shurdington and Witcombe with Bentham	
524	26/07/95	Buckingham Palace	Church Commissioners Schemes	Diocese of Gloucester: Cheltenham, Emmanuel with St Stephen	
525	26/07/95	Buckingham Palace	Church Commissioners Schemes	Diocese of Gloucester: Didmarton with Oldbury on the Hill	
526	26/07/95	Buckingham Palace	Church Commissioners Schemes	Diocese of Hereford: Hereford South Wye	
527	26/07/95	Buckingham Palace	Church Commissioners Schemes	Diocese of Leicester: Broughton Astley and Croft with Stoney Stanton	
528	26/07/95	Buckingham Palace	Church Commissioners Schemes	Diocese of Leicester: Emmanuel, Loughborough	
529	26/07/95	Buckingham Palace	Church Commissioners Schemes	Diocese of Lichfield: leighton under the Wreckin	
530	26/07/95	Buckingham Palace	Church Commissioners Schemes	Diocese of Lincoln: Harlaxton Group	
531	26/07/95	Buckingham Palace	Church Commissioners Schemes	Diocese of Lincoln: Immingham	
532	26/07/95	Buckingham Palace	Church Commissioners Schemes	Diocese of Lincoln: Saxonwell	
533	26/07/95	Buckingham Palace	Church Commissioners Schemes	Diocese of Lincoln: Wickenby Group	
534	26/07/95	Buckingham Palace	Church Commissioners Schemes	Diocese of London: St Anne Brondesbury	
535	26/07/95	Buckingham Palace	Church Commissioners Schemes	Diocese of Manchester: Pendleton	
536	26/07/95	Buckingham Palace	Church Commissioners Schemes	Diocese of Manchester: Swinton and Pendlebury	
537	26/07/95	Buckingham Palace	Church Commissioners Schemes	Diocese of Norwich: Holkham with Egmere and Quarles	
538	26/07/95	Buckingham Palace	Church Commissioners Schemes	Diocese of Norwich: Thetford	
539	26/07/95	Buckingham Palace	Church Commissioners Schemes	Diocese of Norwich: Titchwell with Chosely	
540	26/07/95	Buckingham Palace	Church Commissioners Schemes	Diocese of Peterborough: Castor with Sulton and Upton with Marholm	
541	26/07/95	Buckingham Palace	Church Commissioners Schemes	Diocese of Portsmouth: St John, Forton	
542	26/07/95	Buckingham Palace	Church Commissioners Schemes	Diocese of Salisbury: Wareham with Arne	
543	26/07/95	Buckingham Palace	Church Commissioners Schemes	Diocese of Sheffield: Nine O'Clock Service	
544	26/07/95	Buckingham Palace	Church Commissioners Schemes	Diocese of Southwell: Burton Joyce with Bulcote	
545	26/07/95	Buckingham Palace	Church Commissioners Schemes	Diocese of Southwell: Ruddington	
546	26/07/95	Buckingham Palace	Church Commissioners Schemes	Diocese of Winchester: Ibsley	
547	26/07/95	Buckingham Palace	Church Commissioners Schemes	Diocese of York: Middleton newton and Sinnington	
548	26/07/95	Buckingham Palace	Churchill College, Cambridge	The University Commissioners (Statute Modifications) (Churchill College, Cambridge) Order 1995	1995/1843
549	26/07/95	Buckingham Palace	Clare College, Cambridge	The University Commissioners (Statute Modifications) (Clare College, Cambridge) Order 1995	1995/1844
550	26/07/95	Buckingham Palace	Clare Hall, Cambridge	The University Commissioners (Statute Modifications) (Clare Hall, Cambridge) Order 1995	1995/1845
551	26/07/95	Buckingham Palace	Corpus Christi College, Oxford	The University Commissioners (Statute Modifications) (Corpus Christi College, Oxford) Order 1995	1995/1811
552	26/07/95	Buckingham Palace	Corpus Christi, Cambridge	The University Commissioners (Statute Modifications) (Corpus Christi College, Cambridge) order 1995	1995/1841
553	26/07/95	Buckingham Palace	Criminal Justice Act 1988	The Criminal Justice Act 1988 (Enforcement of Northern Ireland Confiscation Orders) Order 1995	1995/1968
554	26/07/95	Buckingham Palace	Darwin College, Cambridge	The University Commissioners (Statute Modifications) (Darwin College, Cambridge) Order 1995	1995/1846
555	26/07/95	Buckingham Palace	Diplomatic Service Order in Council 1991	Diplomatic Service Order in Council 1991 Amendment	
556	26/07/95	Buckingham Palace	Downing College, Cambridge	The University Commissioners (Statute Modifications) (Downing College, Cambridge) Order 1995	1995/1847
557	26/07/95	Buckingham Palace	Drug Trafficking Act 1994	The Drug Trafficking Act 1994 (Enforcement of Northern Ireland Confiscation Orders) Order 1995	1995/1967
558	26/07/95	Buckingham Palace	Emmanuel College, Cambridge	The University Commissioners (Statute Modifications) (Emmanuel College, Cambridge) Order 1995	1995/1848
559	26/07/95	Buckingham Palace	European Communities Act 1972	The Air Navigation (No.2) Order 1995	1995/1970
560	26/07/95	Buckingham Palace	Exeter College, Oxford	The University Commissioners (Statute Modifications) (Exeter College, Oxford) Order 1995	1995/1813
561	26/07/95	Buckingham Palace	Extradition Act 1989	The European Convention on Extradition Order 1990 (Amendment) (No.2) Order 1995	1995/1962
562	26/07/95	Buckingham Palace	Films Act 1985	The European Convention on Cinematographic Co-production (Amendment) (No.2) Order 1995	1995/1963
563	26/07/95	Buckingham Palace	Fitzwilliam College, Cambridge	The University Commissioners (Statute Modifications) (Fitzwilliam College, Cambridge) Order 1995	1995/1849
564	26/07/95	Buckingham Palace	Girton College, Cambridge	The University Commissioners (Statute Modifications) (Girton College, Cambridge) Order 1995	1995/1850
565	26/07/95	Buckingham Palace	Gonville and Caius College, Cambridge	The University Commissioners (Statute Modifications) (Gonville and Caius College, Cambridge) Order 1995	1995/1851
566	26/07/95	Buckingham Palace	Hertford College, Oxford	The University Commissioners (Statute Modifications) (Hertford College, Oxford) Order 1995	1995/1814
567	26/07/95	Buckingham Palace	Hong Kong Letters Patent 1992	The Hong Kong (Acts of the Legislative Council) Validation Order 1995	
568	26/07/95	Buckingham Palace	Hughes Hall, Cambridge	The University Commissioners (Statute Modifications) (Hughes Hall, Cambridge) Order 1995	1995/1852
569	26/07/95	Buckingham Palace	Imperial College of Science, Technology and Medicine	Appointment of the Rt Hon Sir Frank Cooper and Baroness Brigstocke	
570	26/07/95	Buckingham Palace	Jersey	Loi (1995) (Abrogation) sur les Etrangers	
571	26/07/95	Buckingham Palace	Jersey	Public Employees (Retirement) (Amendment No. 5) (Jersey) Law 1995	
572	26/07/95	Buckingham Palace	Jersey	Social Security (Amendment No. 11) (Jersey) law 1995	
573	26/07/95	Buckingham Palace	Jersey	The Royal Bank of Scotland International Limited (Jersey) Law 1995	
574	26/07/95	Buckingham Palace	Jesus College, Cambridge	The University Commissioners (Statute Modifications) (Jesus College, Cambridge) Order 1995	1995/1853
575	26/07/95	Buckingham Palace	Jesus College, Oxford	The University Commissioners (Statute Modifications) (Jesus College, Oxford) Order 1995	1995/1815
576	26/07/95	Buckingham Palace	Keble College, Oxford	The University Commissioners (Statute Modifications) (Kebel College, Oxford) Order 1995	1995/1816
577	26/07/95	Buckingham Palace	Kings College, Cambridge	The University Commissioners (Statute Modifications) (Kings College, Cambridge) Order 1995	1995/1854
578	26/07/95	Buckingham Palace	Lad Margaret Hall, Oxford	The University Commissioners (Statute Modifications) (Lady Margaret Hall, Oxford) Order 1995	1995/1817
579	26/07/95	Buckingham Palace	Linacre College, Oxford	The University Commissioners (Statute Modifications) (Linacre College, Oxford) Order 1995	1995/1818
580	26/07/95	Buckingham Palace	Lincoln College, Oxford	The University Commissioners (Statute Modifications) (Lincoln College, Oxford) Order 1995	1995/1819
581	26/07/95	Buckingham Palace	Lucy Cavendish College, Cambridge	The University Commissioners (Statute Modifications) (Lucy Cavendish College, Cambridge) Order 1995	1995/1855
582	26/07/95	Buckingham Palace	Magdalene College, Cambridge	The University Commissioners (Statute Modifications) (Magdalene College, Cambridge) Order 1995	1995/1856
583	26/07/95	Buckingham Palace	Magdalen College, Oxford	The University Commissioners (Statute Modifications) (Magdalen College, Oxford) Order 1995	1995/1820
584	26/07/95	Buckingham Palace	Merton College, Oxford	The University Commissioners (Statute Modifications) (Merton College, Oxford) Order 1995	1995/1821
585	26/07/95	Buckingham Palace	Misuse of Drugs Act 1971	The Misuse of Drugs Act 1971 (Modification) Order 1995	1995/1966
586	26/07/95	Buckingham Palace	Naval Medical Compassionate Fund Act 1915	The Naval Medical Compassionate Fund (Amendment) Order 1995	1995/1965
587	26/07/95	Buckingham Palace	New College, Oxford	The University Commissioners (Statute Modifications) (New College, Oxford) Order 1995	1995/1822
588	26/07/95	Buckingham Palace	New Hall, Cambridge	The University Commissioners (Statute Modifications) (New Hall, Cambridge) Order 1995	1995/1858
589	26/07/95	Buckingham Palace	Newnham College, Cambridge	The University Commissioners (Statute Modifications) (Newnham College, Cambridge) Order 1995	1995/1857
590	26/07/95	Buckingham Palace	Northern Ireland Act 1974	The Appropriation (No.2) (Northern Ireland) Order 1995	1995/1969
591	26/07/95	Buckingham Palace	Northern Ireland Act 1974	The Trade Union and Labour Relations (Northern Ireland) Order 1995	1995/1980
592	26/07/95	Buckingham Palace	Nuffield College, Oxford	The University Commissioners (Statute Modifications) (Nuffield College, Oxford)	1995/1823
593	26/07/95	Buckingham Palace	Order of Reference	Engineering Council: Supplemental Charter	
594	26/07/95	Buckingham Palace	Oriel College, Oxford	The University Commissioners (Statute Modifications) (Oriel College, Oxford) Order 1995	1995/1824
595	26/07/95	Buckingham Palace	Pembroke College, Cambridge	The University Commissioners (Statute Modifications) (Pembroke College, Cambridge) Order 1995	1995/1859
596	26/07/95	Buckingham Palace	Pembroke College, Oxford	The University Commissioners (Statute Modifications) (Pembroke College, Oxford) Order 1995	1995/1825
597	26/07/95	Buckingham Palace	Peterhouse, Cambridge	The University Commissioners (Statute Modifications) (Peterhouse, Cambridge) Order 1995	1995/1860
598	26/07/95	Buckingham Palace	Queens' College, Cambridge	The University Commissioners (Statute Modifications) (Queens' College, Cambridge) Order 1995	1995/1861
599	26/07/95	Buckingham Palace	Queen's College, Oxford	The University Commissioners (Statute Modifications) (The Queen's College, Oxford) Order 1995	1995/1826
600	26/07/95	Buckingham Palace	Robinson College, Cambridge	The University Commissioners (Statute Modifications) (Robinson College, Cambridge) Order 1995	1995/1862

== 601 to 700 ==
ID	Date	Venue	Order Name	Order Subject	SI Number
601	26/07/95	Buckingham Palace	Selwyn College, Cambridge	The University Commissioners (Statute Modifications) (Selwyn College, Cambridge) Order 1995	1995/1863
602	26/07/95	Buckingham Palace	Sidney Sussex College, Cambridge	The University Commissioners (Statute Modifications) (Sidney Sussex College, Cambridge) Order 1995	1995/1864
603	26/07/95	Buckingham Palace	Somerville College, Oxford	The University Commissioners (Statute Modifications) (Somerville College, Oxford) Order 1995	1995/1833
604	26/07/95	Buckingham Palace	St Anne's College, Oxford	The University Commissioners (Statute Modifications) (St Anne's College, Oxford) Order 1995	1995/1827
605	26/07/95	Buckingham Palace	St Antony's College, Oxford	The University Commissioners (Statute Modifications) (St Antony's College, Oxford	1995/1835
606	26/07/95	Buckingham Palace	St Catherine's College, Cambridge	The University Commissioners (Statute Modifications) (St Catherine's College, Cambridge) Order 1995	1995/1865
607	26/07/95	Buckingham Palace	St Catherine's College, Oxford	The University Commissioners (Statute Modifications) (St Catherine's College, Oxford) Order 1995	1995/1828
608	26/07/95	Buckingham Palace	St Edmund Hall, Oxford	The University Commissioners (Statute Modifications) (St Edmund Hall, Oxford) Order 1995	1995/1829
609	26/07/95	Buckingham Palace	St Edmunds College, Cambridge	The University Commissioners (Statute Modifications) (St Edmund's College, Cambridge) Order 1995	1995/1866
610	26/07/95	Buckingham Palace	St Hilda's College, Oxford	The University Commissioners (Statute Modifications) (St Hilda's College, Oxford) Order 1995	1995/1830
611	26/07/95	Buckingham Palace	St Hugh's College, Oxford	The University Commissioners (Statute Modifications) (St Hugh's College, Oxford) Order 1995	1995/1831
612	26/07/95	Buckingham Palace	St John Baptist College, Oxford	The University Commissioners (Statute Modifications) (St John Baptist College, Oxford) Order 1995	1995/1832
613	26/07/95	Buckingham Palace	St John's College, Cambridge	The University Commissioners (Statute Modifications) (St John's College, Cambridge) Order 1995	1995/1867
614	26/07/95	Buckingham Palace	St Peter's College, Oxford	The University Commissioners (Statute Modifications) (St Peter's College, Oxford) Order 1995	1995/1834
615	26/07/95	Buckingham Palace	Trinity College, Cambridge	The University Commissioners (Statute Modifications) (Trinity College, Cambridge) Order 1995	1995/1868
616	26/07/95	Buckingham Palace	Trinity College, Oxford	The University Commissioners (Statute Modifications) (Trinity College, Oxford) Order 1995	1995/1836
617	26/07/95	Buckingham Palace	Trinity Hall, Cambridge	The University Commissioners (Statute Modifications) (Trinity Hall, Cambridge) Order 1995	1995/1869
618	26/07/95	Buckingham Palace	University College, Oxford	The University Commissioners (Statute Modifications) (University College, Oxford) Order 1995	1995/1837
619	26/07/95	Buckingham Palace	Wadham College, Oxford	The University Commissioners (Statute Modifications) (Wadham College, Oxford) Order 1995	1995/1838
620	26/07/95	Buckingham Palace	Wolfson College, Cambridge	The University Commissioners (Statute Modifications) (Wolfson College, Cambridge) Order 1995	1995/1870
621	26/07/95	Buckingham Palace	Wolfson College, Oxford	The University Commissioners (Statute Modifications) (Wolfson College, Oxford) Order 1995	1995/1839
622	26/07/95	Buckingham Palace	Worcester College in the University of Oxford	The University Commissioners (Statute Modifications) (Worcester College in the University of Oxford) Order 1995	1995/1840
623	14/08/95	Council Chamber Whitehall	Royal College of Psychiatrists	Bye-Law Amendments	
624	20/08/95	Council Chamber Whitehall	Institute of Chartered Accountants of Scotland	Variation in Rules	
625	30/08/95	Council Chamber Whitehall	Further and Higher Education (Scotland) Act 1992	The Royal Scottish Academy of Music and Drama (Scotland) Order of Council 1995	1995/2261
626	04/09/95	Council Chamber Whitehall	Further and Higher Education Act 1992	Power to Award Degrees etc. (Canterbury Christ Church College) Order of Council 1995	
627	06/09/95	Council Chamber Whitehall	Veterinary Surgeons Act 1966	The Veterinary Surgeons (Examination of Commonwealth and Foreign Candidates) (Amendment) Regulations Order of Council 1995	1995/2396
628	06/09/95	Council Chamber Whitehall	Veterinary Surgeons Act 1966	The Veterinary Surgeons (Practice by Students) (Amendment) Regulations Order of Council 1995	1995/2397
629	28/09/95	Council Chamber Whitehall	Southampton Institute of Higher Education	Modifications to Instruments of Government	
630	03/10/95	Council Chamber Whitehall	Further and Higher Education Act 1992	Power to Award Degrees etc. (Bolton Institute of Higher Education) Order of Council 1995	
631	04/10/95	Council Chamber Whitehall	Cranfield University	Statute Amendments	
632	12/10/95	Council Chamber Whitehall	Royal British Legion	Alterations to Rules	
633	12/10/95	Council Chamber Whitehall	University of Leeds	Statute Amendments	
634	16/10/95	Council Chamber Whitehall	General Dental Council	Registration of two additional Diplomas in Dentistry at the University of Manchester	
635	18/10/95	Buckingham Palace	British Broadcasting Corporation	Sir David Scholey, Adrian White and Richard Eyre appointed Governors of the BBC	
636	18/10/95	Buckingham Palace	British School at Rome	Supplemental Charter	
637	18/10/95	Buckingham Palace	Church Commissioners Schemes	Diocese of Bath and Wells: Yeovil Holy Trinity	
638	18/10/95	Buckingham Palace	Church Commissioners Schemes	Diocese of Bristol: St Barnabas, Knowle	
639	18/10/95	Buckingham Palace	Church Commissioners Schemes	Diocese of Bristol: Stanton Quinton, Hullavington and Gritleton with Norton and Leigh Delamere	
640	18/10/95	Buckingham Palace	Church Commissioners Schemes	Diocese of Chelmsford: Ardleigh	
641	18/10/95	Buckingham Palace	Church Commissioners Schemes	Diocese of Chelmsford: Wickham Bishops	
642	18/10/95	Buckingham Palace	Church Commissioners Schemes	Diocese of Derby: St Chad, Mill Hill	
643	18/10/95	Buckingham Palace	Church Commissioners Schemes	Diocese of Durham: Kelloe and Coxhoe	
644	18/10/95	Buckingham Palace	Church Commissioners Schemes	Diocese of Ely: Fen Drayton	
645	18/10/95	Buckingham Palace	Church Commissioners Schemes	Diocese of Guildford: Seale, Puttenham & Wanborough	
646	18/10/95	Buckingham Palace	Church Commissioners Schemes	Diocese of Lichfield: St Peter, Little Aston	
647	18/10/95	Buckingham Palace	Church Commissioners Schemes	Diocese of Lincoln: Market Rasen	
648	18/10/95	Buckingham Palace	Church Commissioners Schemes	Diocese of Liverpool: St Anne Warrington	
649	18/10/95	Buckingham Palace	Church Commissioners Schemes	Diocese of London: Holy Trinity, Mile End	
650	18/10/95	Buckingham Palace	Church Commissioners Schemes	Diocese of London: St Anne and St Agnes, Gresham Street	
651	18/10/95	Buckingham Palace	Church Commissioners Schemes	Diocese of Manchester: St James, Wardle	
652	18/10/95	Buckingham Palace	Church Commissioners Schemes	Diocese of Manchester: St John, Miles Platting	
653	18/10/95	Buckingham Palace	Church Commissioners Schemes	Diocese of Manchester: St Paul, Bury	
654	18/10/95	Buckingham Palace	Church Commissioners Schemes	Diocese of Norwich: Walsingham, Houghton and Barsham	
655	18/10/95	Buckingham Palace	Church Commissioners Schemes	Diocese of Oxford: St Mary, Swinbrook	
656	18/10/95	Buckingham Palace	Church Commissioners Schemes	Diocese of Rochester: St Mary Strood	
657	18/10/95	Buckingham Palace	Church Commissioners Schemes	Diocese of Salisbury: Bishopstrow & Boreham	
658	18/10/95	Buckingham Palace	Church Commissioners Schemes	Diocese of Salisbury: Bratton	
659	18/10/95	Buckingham Palace	Church Commissioners Schemes	Diocese of St Albans: Clifton and Southill	
660	18/10/95	Buckingham Palace	Church Commissioners Schemes	Diocese of St Edmundsbury and Ipswich: Lavenham with Preston	
661	18/10/95	Buckingham Palace	Church Commissioners Schemes	Diocese of York: Eston with Normanby	
662	18/10/95	Buckingham Palace	Church Commissioners Schemes	Diocese of York: Stainton	
663	18/10/95	Buckingham Palace	Civil Aviation Act 1949	The Air Navigation (Hong Kong) Order 1995	1995/2700
664	18/10/95	Buckingham Palace	Civil Aviation Act 1949	The Air Navigation (Overseas Territories) (Amendment) Order 1995	1995/2701
665	18/10/95	Council Chamber Whitehall	College of Ophthalmologists	Amendments to Ordinances	
666	18/10/95	Buckingham Palace	College of Ophthalmologists	Charter Amendments	
667	18/10/95	Buckingham Palace	Extradition Act 1989	The European Convention on Extradition Order 1990 (Amendment) (No.3) Order 1995	1995/2703
668	18/10/95	Buckingham Palace	Films Act 1985	The European Convention on Cinematographic Co-production (Amendment) (No.3) Order 1995	1995/2730
669	18/10/95	Buckingham Palace	Foreign Judgements (Reciprocal Enforcement) Act 1933	The Reciprocal Enforcement of Foreign Judgements (Canada) (Amendment) Order 1995	1995/2708
670	18/10/95	Buckingham Palace	Guernsey	The Food and Drugs (Amendment) (Guernsey) Law 1995	
671	18/10/95	Buckingham Palace	Guernsey	The Limited Partnerships (Guernsey) Law 1995	
672	18/10/95	Buckingham Palace	Guernsey	The Motor Taxation and Licensing (Amendment) (Guernsey) Law 1995	
673	18/10/95	Buckingham Palace	Income and Corporation Taxes Act 1988	The Double Taxation Relief (Taxes on Income) (Belarus) Order 1995	1995/2706
674	18/10/95	Buckingham Palace	Income and Corporation Taxes Act 1988	The Double Taxation Relief (Taxes on Income) (Bolivia) Order 1995	1995/2707
675	18/10/95	Council Chamber Whitehall	Institute of Chartered Accountants in England and Wales	Bye-Law Amendments	
676	18/10/95	Council Chamber Whitehall	Institute of Marine Engineers	Bye-Law Amendments	
677	18/10/95	Buckingham Palace	Jersey	Administrative Decisions (Review) (Amendment) (Jersey) Law 1995	
678	18/10/95	Buckingham Palace	Jersey	Anatomy and Human Tissue (Amendment) (Jersey) Law 1995	
679	18/10/95	Buckingham Palace	Jersey	Health Care (Registration) (Jersey) Law 1995	
680	18/10/95	Buckingham Palace	Jersey	Hire Cars (Amendment No.2) (Jersey) Law 1995	
681	18/10/95	Buckingham Palace	Jersey	Jurat: Geoffrey Hubert Hamon	
682	18/10/95	Buckingham Palace	Jersey	Loi (1995) (Amendment No. 5) sur l'Instruction Primaire	
683	18/10/95	Buckingham Palace	Jersey	Medicines (Jersey) Law 1995	
684	18/10/95	Buckingham Palace	Maintenance Orders (Reciprocal Enforcement) Act 1972	The Reciprocal Enforcement of Maintenance Orders (United States of America) Order 1995	1995/2709
685	18/10/95	Buckingham Palace	Naval and Marine Pay and Pensions Act 1865	Naval and Marine Pay and Pensions (Pensions Increase) Order 1995	
686	18/10/95	Buckingham Palace	Naval and Marine Pay and Pensions Act 1865	Naval and Marines Pay and Pensions (Hong Kong Locally Engaged Ratings' Service Gratuities and Attributable Disablement and Death Awards) Order 1995	
687	18/10/95	Buckingham Palace	Northern Ireland Act 1974	The Child Support (Northern Ireland) Order 1995	1995/2702
688	18/10/95	Buckingham Palace	Northern Ireland Act 1974	The Health and Personal Social Services (Amendment) (Northern Ireland) Order 1995	1995/2704
689	18/10/95	Buckingham Palace	Northern Ireland Act 1974	The Jobseekers (Northern Ireland) Order 1995	1995/2705
690	18/10/95	Buckingham Palace	Order of Reference	Royal Air Forces Association: Charter of Incorporation	
691	18/10/95	Buckingham Palace	Order of Reference	Royal Society for the Protection of Birds: Supplemental Charter	
692	18/10/95	Buckingham Palace	Parliament	Prorogation: 8/11/95-15/11/95	
693	18/10/95	Buckingham Palace	Queen Mary and Westfield College, University of London	Charter Amendments	
694	18/10/95	Council Chamber Whitehall	Queen Mary and Westfield College, University of London	Statute Amendments	
695	18/10/95	Buckingham Palace	Social Security Administration Act 1992	The Social Security (Canada) Order 1995	1995/2699
696	18/10/95	Buckingham Palace	Universities of Oxford and Cambridge Act 1923	University of Oxford: Amendment of Statutes II & III	
697	18/10/95	Buckingham Palace	University of Cambridge	Petition to disallow statute amendment - dismissed	
698	19/10/95	Council Chamber Whitehall	Medical Act 1983	The General Medical Council (Registration (Fees) (Amendment) Regulations) Order of Council 1995	1995/2786
699	01/11/95	Council Chamber Whitehall	Royal College of Anaesthetists	Amendments to Ordinances	
700	07/11/95	Council Chamber Whitehall	Education Act 1988	University of Central Lancashire: Instrument of Government	

== 701 to 800 ==
ID	Date	Venue	Order Name	Order Subject	SI Number
701	10/11/95	Council Chamber Whitehall	University of Southampton	Statute Amendments	
702	23/11/95	Buckingham Palace	Brunel University	Appointment of David Wolfe Keene as Visitor	
703	23/11/95	Buckingham Palace	Charities Act 1993	The Exempt Charities Order 1995	1995/2998
704	23/11/95	Buckingham Palace	Church Commissioners Schemes	Diocese of Birmingham: St Gregory the Great	
705	23/11/95	Buckingham Palace	Church Commissioners Schemes	Diocese of Derby: The Benefice of Walbrook Epiphany	
706	23/11/95	Buckingham Palace	Church Commissioners Schemes	Diocese of Durham: Denton and Ingleton	
707	23/11/95	Buckingham Palace	Church Commissioners Schemes	Diocese of Durham: South Shields	
708	23/11/95	Buckingham Palace	Church Commissioners Schemes	Diocese of Durham: St Aidan, Blackhill	
709	23/11/95	Buckingham Palace	Church Commissioners Schemes	Diocese of Exeter: Cove	
710	23/11/95	Buckingham Palace	Church Commissioners Schemes	Diocese of Exeter: Moretonhampstead, Manaton, North Bovey and Lustleigh	
711	23/11/95	Buckingham Palace	Church Commissioners Schemes	Diocese of Exeter: Stockland, Dalwood, Kilmington and Shute	
712	23/11/95	Buckingham Palace	Church Commissioners Schemes	Diocese of Hereford: St Michael, Dulas	
713	23/11/95	Buckingham Palace	Church Commissioners Schemes	Diocese of Leicester: Blackfordby and Woodville	
714	23/11/95	Buckingham Palace	Church Commissioners Schemes	Diocese of Leicester: St Mary Magdalene, Stapleford	
715	23/11/95	Buckingham Palace	Church Commissioners Schemes	Diocese of Lincoln: Carlby	
716	23/11/95	Buckingham Palace	Church Commissioners Schemes	Diocese of Newcastle: Bamburgh and Lucker, Beadnell with Ellingham, Belford	
717	23/11/95	Buckingham Palace	Church Commissioners Schemes	Diocese of Oxford: Chinnor with Emmington and Sydenham and Aston Rowant with Crowell	
718	23/11/95	Buckingham Palace	Church Commissioners Schemes	Diocese of Oxford: Finmere with Mixbury, Cottisford, Hardwick with Tusmore and Newton Purcell with Shelswell	
719	23/11/95	Buckingham Palace	Church Commissioners Schemes	Diocese of Peterborough: Kettering, Christ the King	
720	23/11/95	Buckingham Palace	Church Commissioners Schemes	Diocese of Peterborough: Little Billing	
721	23/11/95	Buckingham Palace	Church Commissioners Schemes	Diocese of Peterborough: Lowick with Sudborough	
722	23/11/95	Buckingham Palace	Church Commissioners Schemes	Diocese of Salisbury: Calne and Blackland	
723	23/11/95	Buckingham Palace	Church Commissioners Schemes	Diocese of Salisbury: St Mary, Irwene	
724	23/11/95	Buckingham Palace	Church Commissioners Schemes	Diocese of Southwark: Battersea Fields	
725	23/11/95	Buckingham Palace	Church Commissioners Schemes	Diocese of York: Bempton with Flamborough, Reighton with Speeton	
726	23/11/95	Buckingham Palace	Church Commissioners Schemes	Diocese of York: Welton with Melton	
727	23/11/95	Buckingham Palace	Civil Service	Civil Service (Amendment) Order in Council 1995	
728	23/11/95	Buckingham Palace	Civil Service	Civil Service Commissioners (No.3) Order in Council 1995	
729	23/11/95	Buckingham Palace	Copyright, Designs and Patents Act 1988	The Copyright (Application to Other Countries) (Amendment) Order 1995	1995/2987
730	23/11/95	Buckingham Palace	Copyright, Designs and Patents Act 1988	The Performances (Reciprocal Protection) (Convention Countries) Order 1995	1995/2990
731	23/11/95	Buckingham Palace	Education (Scotland) Act 1980	Appointment of Bartolomeo Emilio Biagini as an Inspector of Schools	
732	23/11/95	Buckingham Palace	European Communities Act 1972	The European Communities (Designation) (No.3) Order 1995	1995/2983
733	23/11/95	Buckingham Palace	Guernsey	The Air Transport Licensing (Guernsey) Law 1995	
734	23/11/95	Buckingham Palace	Guernsey	The Misuse of Drugs (Amendment) (Bailiwick of Guernsey) Law 1995	
735	23/11/95	Buckingham Palace	Guernsey	The Royal Bank of Scotland (Bailiwick of Guernsey) Law 1995	
736	23/11/95	Buckingham Palace	Guernsey	The Social Insurance (Amendment) (No.2) (Guernsey) Law 1995	
737	23/11/95	Buckingham Palace	Imperial College of Science, Technology and Medicine	Appointment of Sir Richard Vincent to Governing Body	
738	23/11/95	Buckingham Palace	Jersey	Matrimonial Causes (Amendment No.8) (Jersey) Law 1995	
739	23/11/95	Buckingham Palace	Jersey	Petition of Brigadier Raoul Charles Lempriere-Robin	
740	23/11/95	Buckingham Palace	Ministerial and other Salaries Act 1975	The Ministerial and other Salaries Order 1995	1995/2984
741	23/11/95	Buckingham Palace	Ministers of the Crown Act 1975	The Transfer of Functions (Education and Employment) Order 1995	1995/2986
742	23/11/95	Buckingham Palace	Ministers of the Crown Act 1975	The Transfer of Functions (European Parliamentary Pay and Pensions) Order 1995	1995/2995
743	23/11/95	Buckingham Palace	Ministers of the Crown Act 1975	The Transfer of Functions (Science) Order 1995	1995/2985
744	23/11/95	Buckingham Palace	Most Venerable Order of the Hospital of Saint John of Jerusalem	Statute Amendments	
745	23/11/95	Buckingham Palace	Northern Ireland Act 1974	The Financial Provisions (Northern Ireland) Order 1995	1995/2991
746	23/11/95	Buckingham Palace	Northern Ireland Act 1974	The Police (Amendment) (Northern Ireland) Order 1995	1995/2993
747	23/11/95	Buckingham Palace	Northern Ireland Act 1974	The Road Traffic (Northern Ireland) Order 1995	1995/2994
748	23/11/95	Buckingham Palace	Parliamentary Constituencies Act 1986	The Parliamentary Constituencies (Northern Ireland) Order 1995	1995/2992
749	23/11/95	Buckingham Palace	Patents Act 1977	The Patents (Convention Countries) (Amendment) Order 1995	1995/2989
750	23/11/95	Buckingham Palace	Principal and Fellows of the Manchester Academy and Harris College in the University of Oxford	Charter of Incorporation	
751	23/11/95	Buckingham Palace	Privy Counsellor Appointment	Owen Arthur: Appointed	
752	23/11/95	Buckingham Palace	Privy Counsellor Appointment	Sir Mathew Thorpe: Sworn	
753	23/11/95	Buckingham Palace	Privy Counsellor Appointment	Sir Nicholas Addison Philips: Sworn	
754	23/11/95	Buckingham Palace	Proclamation	Determining the Specifications and Design for Five-Pound Coins Commemorating our Seventieth Birthday	
755	23/11/95	Buckingham Palace	Proclamation	Determining the Specifications and Design for Two-Pound Coins Commemorating the Hosting of the European Football Championships in England in 1996	
756	23/11/95	Buckingham Palace	Public Appointments	The Public Appointments Commissioner Order in Council 1995	
757	23/11/95	Buckingham Palace	Public Appointments	The Public Appointments Order in Council 1995	
758	23/11/95	Buckingham Palace	Registered Designs Act 1949	The Designs (Convention Countries) (Amendment) Order 1995	1995/2988
759	23/11/95	Buckingham Palace	Sealing Order	Determining the Specifications and Design for Five-Pound Coins Commemorating our Seventieth Birthday	
760	23/11/95	Buckingham Palace	Sealing Order	Determining the Specifications and Design for Two-Pound Coins Commemorating the Hosting of the European Football Championships in England in 1997	
761	23/11/95	Buckingham Palace	Trade Marks Act 1994	The Trade Marks (Claims to Priority from Relevant Countries) (Amendment) Order 1994	1995/2997
762	23/11/95	Buckingham Palace	Universities of Oxford and Cambridge Act 1923	Darwin College, Cambridge; Amendment of Statute XVII	
763	23/11/95	Buckingham Palace	Universities of Oxford and Cambridge Act 1923	University of Cambridge: Statute Amendment	
764	23/11/95	Buckingham Palace	Universities of Oxford and Cambridge Act 1923	University of Cambridge: Statute Amendment	
765	23/11/95	Buckingham Palace	Universities of Oxford and Cambridge Act 1923	University of Oxford: Amendment of Statute VII and XII	
766	23/11/95	Buckingham Palace	University of Essex	Appointment of Lord Slynn as Visitor	
767	24/11/95	Council Chamber Whitehall	Chartered Institute of Taxation	Amendments to Byelaws	
768	27/11/95	Council Chamber Whitehall	Royal Pharmaceutical Society of Great Britain	Amendments to Byelaws	
769	06/12/95	Council Chamber Whitehall	Institution of Structural Engineers	Bye-Law Amendments	
770	08/12/95	Council Chamber Whitehall	Chartered Association of Certified Accountants	Bye-Law Amendments	
771	08/12/95	Council Chamber Whitehall	Chartered Institute of Management Accountants	Bye-Law Amendments	
772	08/12/95	Council Chamber Whitehall	Institute of Actuaries	Bye-Law Amendments	
773	13/12/95	Buckingham Palace	Burial Act 1853	Burials: Notice: Bishops Hatfield, Hertfordshire	
774	13/12/95	Buckingham Palace	Chartered Institute of Public Finance and Accountancy	Amendments to Charter	
775	13/12/95	Buckingham Palace	Church Commissioners Schemes	Diocese of Bath and Wells: Western-Super-Mare	
776	13/12/95	Buckingham Palace	Church Commissioners Schemes	Diocese of Chelmsford: Christ Church, Southchurch	
777	13/12/95	Buckingham Palace	Church Commissioners Schemes	Diocese of Chelmsford: Greenstead	
778	13/12/95	Buckingham Palace	Church Commissioners Schemes	Diocese of Chelmsford: Panfield and Rayne	
779	13/12/95	Buckingham Palace	Church Commissioners Schemes	Diocese of Chelmsford: Stisted with Bradwell-juxta-Coggeshall and Pattiswick	
780	13/12/95	Buckingham Palace	Church Commissioners Schemes	Diocese of Derby: Immanuel, Stapenhill	
781	13/12/95	Buckingham Palace	Church Commissioners Schemes	Diocese of Exeter: Lynton, Brendon, Countisbury, Lynmouth, Barbrook, Parracombe and Martinhoe	
782	13/12/95	Buckingham Palace	Church Commissioners Schemes	Diocese of Lincoln: Messingham, Scotter with East Ferry, Scotton with Northorpe	
783	13/12/95	Buckingham Palace	Church Commissioners Schemes	Diocese of Norwich: St Margaret, Wickmere with Wolerton	
784	13/12/95	Buckingham Palace	Church Commissioners Schemes	Diocese of Rochester: St Paulinus, Cray	
785	13/12/95	Buckingham Palace	Church Commissioners Schemes	Diocese of Southwark: Betchworth	
786	13/12/95	Buckingham Palace	Church Commissioners Schemes	Diocese of Southwark: Richmond	
787	13/12/95	Buckingham Palace	Civil Service	Civil Service Commissioners (No.4) Order in Council 1995	
788	13/12/95	Buckingham Palace	Engineering Council	Supplemental Charter	
789	13/12/95	Buckingham Palace	European Communities Act 1972	European Specialist Medical Qualifications Order 1995	1995/3208
790	13/12/95	Buckingham Palace	European Communities Act 1972	The European Communities (Designation) (No.4) Order 1995	1995/3207
791	13/12/95	Buckingham Palace	European Communities Act 1972	The European Specialist Medical Qualifications Order 1995	1995/3208
792	13/12/95	Buckingham Palace	Extradition Act 1989	The Extradition (Torture) (Bermuda) Order 1995	1995/3209
793	13/12/95	Buckingham Palace	Guernsey	The Patents, Designs and Trade Marks (Amendment) (Bailiwick of Guernsey) Law 1995	
794	13/12/95	Buckingham Palace	Jersey	European Communities Legislation (Implementation) (Jersey) Law 1995	
795	13/12/95	Buckingham Palace	Jersey	Housing (Amendment No.8) (Jersey) Law 1995	
796	13/12/95	Buckingham Palace	Northern Ireland Act 1974	The Agriculture (Conservation Grants) (Northern Ireland) Order 1995	1995/3212
797	13/12/95	Buckingham Palace	Northern Ireland Act 1974	The Pensions (Northern Ireland) Order 1995	1995/3213
798	13/12/95	Buckingham Palace	Northern Ireland Act 1974	The Polygamous Marriages (Northern Ireland) Order 1995	1995/3211
799	13/12/95	Buckingham Palace	Northern Ireland Act 1974	The Street Works (Northern Ireland) Order 1995	1995/3210
800	13/12/95	Buckingham Palace	Privy Council	Appointment of Kathleen Phyllis Makin as Deputy Clerk of the Council	

== 801 to 900 ==
ID	Date	Venue	Order Name	Order Subject	SI Number
801	13/12/95	Buckingham Palace	Privy Counsellor Appointment	Richard Carew: Appointed	
802	13/12/95	Buckingham Palace	Universities of Oxford and Cambridge Act 1923	Magdalen College, Oxford: Statute XXIII Amendments	
803	13/12/95	Buckingham Palace	Universities of Oxford and Cambridge Act 1923	Selwyn College, Cambridge: Amendment of College Statute 9	
804	13/12/95	Buckingham Palace	Universities of Oxford and Cambridge Act 1923	University of Cambridge: Statute Amendment	
805	13/12/95	Buckingham Palace	University of Leeds	Re-Appointment of Mrs Yvonne Jackson to Court	
806	13/12/95	Buckingham Palace	University of Leeds	Re-Appointment of Peter Collins to Court	
807	13/12/95	Buckingham Palace	Victoria University of Manchester	Amendments to Supplemental Charter	
808	13/12/95	Council Chamber Whitehall	Victoria University of Manchester	Statute Amendments	
809	18/12/95	Council Chamber Whitehall	Opticians Act 1989	Appointment of Professor Charles McGhee to be a member of the General Optical Council	
810	21/12/95	Council Chamber Whitehall	Royal Pharmaceutical Society of Great Britain	Bye-Law Amendments	
811	28/12/95	Council Chamber Whitehall	University of York	Statute Amendments	
812	10/01/96	Council Chamber Whitehall	University of Liverpool	Appointment of Baron Owen as Chancellor	
813	15/01/96	Council Chamber Whitehall	University College of North Wales	Appointment of Mrs Noreen Edwards as member of Court of the University	
814	15/01/96	Council Chamber Whitehall	University College of North Wales	Appointment of Sir John Mason as member of Court of the University	
815	22/01/96	Council Chamber Whitehall	Further and Higher Education (Scotland) Act 1992	Glasgow School of Art (Scotland) Order of Council 1996	1996/120
816	26/01/96	Council Chamber Whitehall	Education Reform Act 1988	University of Humberside: Instrument of Government	
817	14/02/96	Buckingham Palace	British Broadcasting Corporation	Appointment of Governors and Chairman of the Corporation	
818	14/02/96	Buckingham Palace	Burial Act 1853	Burials: Notice: 5 Churchyards	
819	14/02/96	Buckingham Palace	Burial Act 1853	Burials: St. Luke's Churchyard, Bishop's Hatfield, Hertfordshire	
820	14/02/96	Buckingham Palace	Child Abduction and Custody Act 1985	The Child Abduction and Custody (Parties to Conventions) (Amendment) Order 1996	1996/269
821	14/02/96	Buckingham Palace	Church Commissioners Schemes	Diocese of Bath and Wells: Spaxton, Goathurst and Charlynch	
822	14/02/96	Buckingham Palace	Church Commissioners Schemes	Diocese of Bath and Wells: West Monkton	
823	14/02/96	Buckingham Palace	Church Commissioners Schemes	Diocese of Blackburn: Saint John, Preston	
824	14/02/96	Buckingham Palace	Church Commissioners Schemes	Diocese of Blackburn: Saint Mary, Preston	
825	14/02/96	Buckingham Palace	Church Commissioners Schemes	Diocese of Blackburn: Saint Peter, Chorley	
826	14/02/96	Buckingham Palace	Church Commissioners Schemes	Diocese of Chelmsford: Colchester, Saint James and Saint Paul with All Saints, Saint Nicholas and Saint Runwald	
827	14/02/96	Buckingham Palace	Church Commissioners Schemes	Diocese of Chelmsford: Leyton, Saint Mary with Saint Edward and Saint Luke	
828	14/02/96	Buckingham Palace	Church Commissioners Schemes	Diocese of Chelmsford: Vange	
829	14/02/96	Buckingham Palace	Church Commissioners Schemes	Diocese of Chester: Saint John the Baptiste, Crewe	
830	14/02/96	Buckingham Palace	Church Commissioners Schemes	Diocese of Coventry: Grandborough, Willoughby, Flecknoe	
831	14/02/96	Buckingham Palace	Church Commissioners Schemes	Diocese of Exeter: Plymouth Emmanuel	
832	14/02/96	Buckingham Palace	Church Commissioners Schemes	Diocese of Leicester: St. Michael	
833	14/02/96	Buckingham Palace	Church Commissioners Schemes	Diocese of Lichfield: Maesbury	
834	14/02/96	Buckingham Palace	Church Commissioners Schemes	Diocese of Lichfield: Newport, Longford, Chetwynd	
835	14/02/96	Buckingham Palace	Church Commissioners Schemes	Diocese of Lincoln:: East Stockwith	
836	14/02/96	Buckingham Palace	Church Commissioners Schemes	Diocese of Norwich: Heydon with Irmingland	
837	14/02/96	Buckingham Palace	Church Commissioners Schemes	Diocese of Rochester: Tunbridge Wells, Holy Trinity with Christ Church	
838	14/02/96	Buckingham Palace	Church Commissioners Schemes	Diocese of Southwark: Limpsfield and Titsey	
839	14/02/96	Buckingham Palace	Church Commissioners Schemes	Diocese of Southwark: Saint Michael	
840	14/02/96	Buckingham Palace	Church Commissioners Schemes	Diocese of St. Albans: Great Amwell with St. Margaret's	
841	14/02/96	Buckingham Palace	Church Commissioners Schemes	Diocese of St. Edmundsbury and Ipswich: Brampton	
842	14/02/96	Buckingham Palace	Church Commissioners Schemes	Diocese of Worcester: Saint Mary, Kingswinford	
843	14/02/96	Buckingham Palace	Church Commissioners Schemes	Diocese of York: Thornaby on Tees	
844	14/02/96	Buckingham Palace	Criminal Justice Act 1988	The Criminal Justice Act 1988 (Designated Countries and Territories) (Amendment) Order 1996	1996/278
845	14/02/96	Buckingham Palace	Crown Office Act 1877	The Crown Office (Forms and Proclamations Rules) (Amendment) Order 1996	1996/276
846	14/02/96	Buckingham Palace	European Communities Act 1972	The European Communities (Definition of Treaties) (Statute of the European Schools) Order 1996	1996/267
847	14/02/96	Buckingham Palace	European Communities Act 1972	The European Communities (Designation) Order 1996	1996/266
848	14/02/96	Buckingham Palace	Extradition Act 1989	The Extradition (Designated Commonwealth Countries) Order 1991 (Amendment) Order 1996	1996/279
849	14/02/96	Buckingham Palace	Institute of Housing	Amendments to Charter	
850	14/02/96	Council Chamber Whitehall	Institute of Housing	Bye-Law Amendments	
851	14/02/96	Buckingham Palace	Institution of Mining and Metallurgy	Amendments to Charter	
852	14/02/96	Council Chamber Whitehall	Institution of Mining and Metallurgy	Bye-Law Alterations	
853	14/02/96	Buckingham Palace	International Organisations Act 1968	The International Sea-Bed Authority (Immunities and Privileges) Order 1996	1996/270
854	14/02/96	Buckingham Palace	International Organisations Act 1968	The International Tribunal for the Law of the Sea (Immunities and Privileges) Order 1996	1996/272
855	14/02/96	Buckingham Palace	Jersey	Hon. John Alexander Goe Coutanche resigns from office of Jurat	
856	14/02/96	Buckingham Palace	Jersey	Social Security (Amendment No. 12) (Jersey) Law 1996	
857	14/02/96	Buckingham Palace	Jersey	States of Jersey (Amendment No. 5) Law 1996	
858	14/02/96	Buckingham Palace	Medical (Professional Performance) Act 1995	The Medical (Professional Performance) Act 1995 (Commencement No. 1) Order 1996	1996/271
859	14/02/96	Buckingham Palace	Merchant Shipping Act 1995	The Merchant Shipping (Categorisation of Registries of Overseas Territories) (Gibraltar) Order 1996	1996/280
860	14/02/96	Buckingham Palace	Merchant Shipping Act 1995	The Merchant Shipping (Gibraltar Colours) Order 1996	1996/281
861	14/02/96	Buckingham Palace	Merchant Shipping Act 1995	The Merchant Shipping (Prevention of Pollution) (Law of the Sea Convention) Order 1996	1996/282
862	14/02/96	Buckingham Palace	Ministers of the Crown Act 1975	The Transfer of Functions (Foreign Service Allowance) Order 1996	1996/313
863	14/02/96	Buckingham Palace	Ministers of the Crown Act 1975	The Transfer of Functions (Registration and Statistics) Order 1996	1996/273
864	14/02/96	Buckingham Palace	Naval and Marine Pay and Pensions Act 1865	Naval and Marine Pay and Pensions (Pay and Allowances) (Amendment) Order 1996	
865	14/02/96	Buckingham Palace	Northern Ireland Act 1974	The County Courts (Amendment) (Northern Ireland) Order 1996	1996/277
866	14/02/96	Buckingham Palace	Northern Ireland Act 1974	The Education (Northern Ireland) Order 1996	1996/274
867	14/02/96	Buckingham Palace	Northern Ireland Act 1974	The Gas (Northern Ireland) Order 1996	1996/275
868	14/02/96	Buckingham Palace	Order of Reference	Royal Academy of Dancing: Supplemental Charter	
869	14/02/96	Buckingham Palace	Order of Reference	Royal Naval Benevolent Society: Supplemental Charter	
870	14/02/96	Buckingham Palace	Privy Counsellor Appointment	Baron Mackay of Drumadoon	
871	14/02/96	Buckingham Palace	Privy Counsellor Appointment	David Philip Heathcoat-Amory	
872	14/02/96	Buckingham Palace	Privy Counsellor Appointment	Michael Ancram	
873	14/02/96	Buckingham Palace	Privy Counsellor Appointment	Richard Carew, Lord Bishop of London	
874	14/02/96	Buckingham Palace	Privy Counsellor Appointment	Sir John Marcus Fox MBE	
875	14/02/96	Buckingham Palace	Royal Faculty of Procurators in Glasgow: Supplementary Charter	Grant of Supplementary Charter	
876	14/02/96	Buckingham Palace	United Nations Act 1946	The Bosnia and Herzegovina (High Representative) Order 1996	1996/268
877	14/02/96	Buckingham Palace	Universities of Oxford and Cambridge Act 1923	Gonville and Caius College, Cambridge: Amendment to Statutes	
878	14/02/96	Buckingham Palace	Universities of Oxford and Cambridge Act 1923	Robinson College, Cambridge: Amendments to Statutes	
879	14/02/96	Buckingham Palace	Universities of Oxford and Cambridge Act 1923	St. Edmund Hall, Oxford: Amendments to Statute	
880	14/02/96	Buckingham Palace	Universities of Oxford and Cambridge Act 1923	University of Cambridge: Statute Amendment	
881	14/02/96	Buckingham Palace	Universities of Oxford and Cambridge Act 1923	University of Cambridge: Statute Amendment	
882	14/02/96	Buckingham Palace	University of Reading	Alteration to Charter	
883	14/02/96	Council Chamber Whitehall	University of Reading	Statute Amendments	
884	14/02/96	Council Chamber Whitehall	University of Wales	Statute Amendments	
885	14/02/96	Buckingham Palace	University of Wales	Variation to Supplemental Charter	
886	27/02/96	Council Chamber Whitehall	University of Kent at Canterbury	Statute Amendments	
887	01/03/96	Council Chamber Whitehall	Veterinary Surgeons Act 1966	The Veterinary Surgeons and Veterinary Practitioners (Registration) (Amendment) Regulations Order of Council 1996	1996/437
888	11/03/96	Council Chamber Whitehall	Institution of Civil Engineers	Bye-Law Amendments	
889	13/03/96	Buckingham Palace	Armed Forces Act 1991	The Army Act 1955 (Isle of Man) Order 1996	1996/723
890	13/03/96	Buckingham Palace	Arts Council of England	Charter Amendments	
891	13/03/96	Buckingham Palace	British Broadcasting Corporation	Charter	
892	13/03/96	Buckingham Palace	Church Commissioners Schemes	Diocese of Leicester: Saint Augustine	
893	13/03/96	Buckingham Palace	Church Commissioners Schemes	Diocese of Lincoln: Saint Hugh, Old Brumby	
894	13/03/96	Buckingham Palace	Church Commissioners Schemes	Diocese of Chelmsford: All Saints, Barling	
895	13/03/96	Buckingham Palace	Church Commissioners Schemes	Diocese of Chelmsford: Finchingfield and Cornish Hall End	
896	13/03/96	Buckingham Palace	Church Commissioners Schemes	Diocese of Chelmsford: Saint John and Christ Church with Saint James	
897	13/03/96	Buckingham Palace	Church Commissioners Schemes	Diocese of Ely: Ely, Holy Trinity with Saint Mary	
898	13/03/96	Buckingham Palace	Church Commissioners Schemes	Diocese of Ely: Orton Waterville	
899	13/03/96	Buckingham Palace	Church Commissioners Schemes	Diocese of Leicester: Saint Barnabas and Christ the Saviour	
900	13/03/96	Buckingham Palace	Church Commissioners Schemes	Diocese of London: Saint Barnabas, Temple Fortune	

== 901 to 1000 ==
ID	Date	Venue	Order Name	Order Subject	SI Number
901	13/03/96	Buckingham Palace	Church Commissioners Schemes	Diocese of Manchester: St. Mary, St. John, St. Chad and St. Luke, Moston	
902	13/03/96	Buckingham Palace	Church Commissioners Schemes	Diocese of Newcastle: St. Luke, Greystead	
903	13/03/96	Buckingham Palace	Church Commissioners Schemes	Diocese of Sheffield: Adwick-le-Street, Burghwallis with Skelbrooke	
904	13/03/96	Buckingham Palace	Church Commissioners Schemes	Diocese of Southwark: Saint Anne and Saint Augustine Bermondsey	
905	13/03/96	Buckingham Palace	Church Commissioners Schemes	Diocese of St. Edmundsbury and Ipswich: Monks Eleigh with Chelsworth	
906	13/03/96	Buckingham Palace	Church Commissioners Schemes	Diocese of York: Eastington and Kilnsea	
907	13/03/96	Buckingham Palace	Guernsey	The Air Force Act 1955 (Bailiwick of Guernsey) Order 1996	1996/718
908	13/03/96	Buckingham Palace	Guernsey	The Army Act 1955 (Bailiwick of Guernsey) Order 1996	1996/722
909	13/03/96	Buckingham Palace	Guernsey	The European Economic Area (Bailiwick of Guernsey) Law 1996	
910	13/03/96	Buckingham Palace	Guernsey	The Naval Discipline Act 1957 (Bailiwick of Guernsey) Order 1996	1996/726
911	13/03/96	Buckingham Palace	Health Service Commissioners Act 1993	The Health Service Commissioner for England (Authorities for the Ashworth, Broadmoor and Rampton Hospitals) Order 1996	1996/717
912	13/03/96	Buckingham Palace	Inheritance Tax Act 1984	The Double Taxation Relief (Taxes on Estates of Deceased Persons and Inheritancesn and on Gifits) (Netherlands) Order 1996	1996/730
913	13/03/96	Buckingham Palace	Isle of Man	The Air Force Act 1955 (Isle of Man) Order 1996	1996/719
914	13/03/96	Buckingham Palace	Isle of Man	The Naval Discipline Act 1957 (Isle of Man) Order 1996	1996/727
915	13/03/96	Buckingham Palace	Jersey	Children (Amendment No. 5) (Jersey) Law 1996	
916	13/03/96	Buckingham Palace	Jersey	Health Insurance (Amendment No. 10) Jersey Law 1996	
917	13/03/96	Buckingham Palace	Jersey	Health Insurance (Amendment No. 9) Jersey Law 1996	
918	13/03/96	Buckingham Palace	Jersey	Interest on Debts and Damages (Jersey) Law 1996	
919	13/03/96	Buckingham Palace	Jersey	Island Planning (Amendment No. 6) (Jersey) Law 1996	
920	13/03/96	Buckingham Palace	Jersey	Public Health (Control of Building) (Amendment No. 3) (Jersey) Law 1996	
921	13/03/96	Buckingham Palace	Jersey	The Air Force Act 1955 (Jersey) Order 1996	1996/720
922	13/03/96	Buckingham Palace	Jersey	The Army Act 1955 (Jersey) Order 1996	1996/724
923	13/03/96	Buckingham Palace	Jersey	The Naval Discipline Act 1957 (Jersey) Order 1996	1996/728
924	13/03/96	Buckingham Palace	Local Government Act 1972	Cardiff County Council: Charter	
925	13/03/96	Buckingham Palace	Local Government Act 1972	The Local Authorities (Armorial Bearings) (Wales) Order 1996	1996/733
926	13/03/96	Buckingham Palace	Local Government Act 1972	York District Council: Charter	
927	13/03/96	Buckingham Palace	Naval and Marine Pay and Pensions Act 1865	Naval and Marine Pay and Pensions (Hong Kong Locally Engaged Ratings' Service Pensions Increases) Order 1996	
928	13/03/96	Buckingham Palace	Naval and Marine Pay and Pensions Act 1865	Naval and Marine Pay and Pensions (Hong Kong Locally Engaged Ratings' Service Pensions Increases) Order 1996	
929	13/03/96	Buckingham Palace	Naval and Marine Pay and Pensions Act 1865	Naval and Marine Pay and Pensions (Non-Effective Benefits and Family Pensions) Order 1996	
930	13/03/96	Buckingham Palace	Naval and Marine Pay and Pensions Act 1865	The Naval, Military and Air Forces etc. (Disablement and Death) Service Pensions Amendment Order 1996	1996/732
931	13/03/96	Buckingham Palace	Northern Ireland Act 1974	The Appropriation (Northern Ireland) Order 1996	1996/721
932	13/03/96	Buckingham Palace	Northern Ireland Act 1974	The Business Tenancies (Northern Ireland) Order 1996	1996/725
933	13/03/96	Buckingham Palace	Reserve Forces Act 1980	The Lord-Lieutenants (Scotland) Order 1996	1996/731
934	13/03/96	Buckingham Palace	Soldiers', Sailors' and Airmen's Families Association	Charter Amendments	
935	13/03/96	Buckingham Palace	Supplemental Charter of 1985 of the University College of Wales	Amendments to Supplemental Charter	
936	13/03/96	Buckingham Palace	Trade Marks Act 1994	The Trade Marks Act 1994 (Isle of Man) Order 1996	1996/729
937	13/03/96	Buckingham Palace	United Nations Act 1946	The United Nations (International Tribunal) (Former Yugoslavia) Order 1996	1996/716
938	13/03/96	Council Chamber Whitehall	University College of Wales, Aberystwyth	Statute Amendments	
939	16/04/96	Council Chamber Whitehall	Education Reform Act 1988	Modifications to Instruments of Government	
940	16/04/96	Council Chamber Whitehall	Education Reform Act 1988	Modifications to Instruments of Government	
941	24/04/96	Windsor Castle	Burial Act 1853	Burials: Finals: 4 Churchyards	
942	24/04/96	Windsor Castle	Burial Act 1853	Burials: Notice: 11 Churchyards	
943	24/04/96	Windsor Castle	Church Commissioners Schemes	Diocese of Chelmsford: Layer de la Haye	
944	24/04/96	Windsor Castle	Church Commissioners Schemes	Diocese of Chichester: Saint Peter's, The Hydneye	
945	24/04/96	Windsor Castle	Church Commissioners Schemes	Diocese of Exeter: Wembworthy with Eggesford	
946	24/04/96	Windsor Castle	Church Commissioners Schemes	Diocese of Lincoln: Saint Helen, Little Cawthorpe, Legbourne	
947	24/04/96	Windsor Castle	Church Commissioners Schemes	Diocese of Manchester: Saint James with Saint Clement and Saint Matthias, Broughton	
948	24/04/96	Windsor Castle	Church Commissioners Schemes	Diocese of Manchester: St. Anne, Tottington	
949	24/04/96	Windsor Castle	Church Commissioners Schemes	Diocese of Norwich: Barney, Fulmodeston with Croxton, Hindringham and Thursford	
950	24/04/96	Windsor Castle	Church Commissioners Schemes	Diocese of Norwich: East Bradenham, St. Mary	
951	24/04/96	Windsor Castle	Church Commissioners Schemes	Diocese of Rochester: Birling, Addington, Ryarsh and Trottiscliffe	
952	24/04/96	Windsor Castle	Church Commissioners Schemes	Diocese of Saint Albans: Toddington	
953	24/04/96	Windsor Castle	Church Commissioners Schemes	Diocese of Southwell: Netherfield with Colwick	
954	24/04/96	Windsor Castle	Education (Scotland) Act 1980	Appointment of Miss Christine Anne Smith Campbell and Mrs. Kathleen Frances Cherry as Inspector of Schools	
955	24/04/96	Windsor Castle	Guernsey	The Reform (Amendment) (Guernsey) Law 1996	
956	24/04/96	Windsor Castle	Hong Kong (Overseas Public Servants) Act 1996	The Hong Kong (Overseas Public Servants) (Continuing Service: Compensation) Order 1996	1996/1139
957	24/04/96	Windsor Castle	Hong Kong (Overseas Public Servants) Act 1996	The Hong Kong (Overseas Public Servants) (Retirement and Compensation) Order 1996	1996/1138
958	24/04/96	Windsor Castle	Jersey	Airport Dues (Amendment No. 3) (Jersey) Law 1996	
959	24/04/96	Windsor Castle	Jersey	Criminal Procedure (Connétables and Centeniers) (Jersey) Law 1996	
960	24/04/96	Windsor Castle	Jersey	Insurance Business (Jersey) Law 1996	
961	24/04/96	Windsor Castle	Jersey	Loi (1996) Amendment No. 12) sur l'Etat Civil	
962	24/04/96	Windsor Castle	Jersey	Loi (1996) Amendment No. 6) réglant la procédure criminelle	
963	24/04/96	Windsor Castle	Jersey	Police Court (Miscellaneous Provisions) (Amendment No. 5) (Jersey) Law 1996	
964	24/04/96	Windsor Castle	Jersey	Reservoirs (Jersey) Law 1996	
965	24/04/96	Windsor Castle	Jersey	Royal Court (Amendment No. 8) (Jersey) Law 1996	
966	24/04/96	Windsor Castle	Jersey	Trusts (Amendment No. 3) (Jersey) Law 1996	
967	24/04/96	Windsor Castle	Loughborough University of Technology	Amendments to Charter	
968	24/04/96	Council Chamber Whitehall	Loughborough University of Technology	Statute Amendments	
969	24/04/96	Windsor Castle	Merchant Shipping Act 1995	The Merchant Shipping (Liability and Compensation for Oil Pollution Damage) (Transitional Provisions) Order 1996	1996/1143
970	24/04/96	Windsor Castle	Prevention of Terrorism (Temporary Provisions) Act 1989	The Prevention of Terrorism (Temporary Provisions) Act 1984 (Jersey) (Revocation) Order 1996	1996/1140
971	24/04/96	Windsor Castle	Royal Society for the Protection of Birds	Supplemental Charter	
972	24/04/96	Windsor Castle	Supreme Court Act 1981	The Maximum Number of Judges Order 1996	1996/1142
973	24/04/96	Windsor Castle	Universities of Oxford and Cambridge Act 1923	Jesus College, Oxford: Amendment to Statute	
974	24/04/96	Windsor Castle	Universities of Oxford and Cambridge Act 1923	Linacre College, Oxford: Amendment to Statutes	
975	24/04/96	Windsor Castle	Universities of Oxford and Cambridge Act 1923	St. Hugh's College, Oxford: Amendment to Statute	
976	24/04/96	Windsor Castle	Universities of Oxford and Cambridge Act 1923	St. Hugh's College, Oxford: Amendment to Statutes	
977	24/04/96	Windsor Castle	Universities of Oxford and Cambridge Act 1923	University of Oxford: Amendment to Statute	
978	24/04/96	Windsor Castle	University of Nottingham	Amendments to Charter	
979	24/04/96	Council Chamber Whitehall	University of Nottingham	Statute Amendments	
980	24/04/96	Windsor Castle	University of Stirling	Amendments to Charter	
981	24/04/96	Council Chamber Whitehall	University of Stirling	Statute Amendments	
982	24/04/96	Windsor Castle	University of Wales, Lampeter	Amendments to Supplemental Charter	
983	24/04/96	Council Chamber Whitehall	University of Wales, Lampeter	Statute Amendments	
984	02/05/96	Council Chamber Whitehall	University College of Swansea	Alteration to Statute	
985	08/05/96	Council Chamber Whitehall	Medical Act 1983	The General Medical Council Health Committee (Procedure) (Amendment) Rules Order of Council 1996	1996/1219
986	08/05/96	Council Chamber Whitehall	Medical Act 1983	The General Medical Council Preliminary Proceedings Committee and Professional Conduct Committee (Procedure) (Amendment) Rules Order of Council 1996	
987	13/05/96	Council Chamber Whitehall	Royal Faculty of Procurators in Glasgow	Bye-laws revision	
988	15/05/96	Buckingham Palace	Burial Act 1853	Burial: Final: St. Mary's Churchyard, North Leigh, Oxfordshire	
989	15/05/96	Buckingham Palace	Burial Act 1853	Burial: Notice: 4 Churchyards	
990	15/05/96	Buckingham Palace	Church Commissioners Schemes	Diocese of Bath and Wells: Christ Church, Nailsea and Tickenham	
991	15/05/96	Buckingham Palace	Church Commissioners Schemes	Diocese of Chelmsford: Plaistow	
992	15/05/96	Buckingham Palace	Church Commissioners Schemes	Diocese of Durham: Darlington Group Ministry	
993	15/05/96	Buckingham Palace	Church Commissioners Schemes	Diocese of Durham: Saint Clare, Newton Aycliffe	
994	15/05/96	Buckingham Palace	Church Commissioners Schemes	Diocese of Exeter: Atherington and High Bickington	
995	15/05/96	Buckingham Palace	Church Commissioners Schemes	Diocese of Exeter: Northam with Westward Ho and Appledore	
996	15/05/96	Buckingham Palace	Church Commissioners Schemes	Diocese of Leicester: Saint Michael and All Angels	
997	15/05/96	Buckingham Palace	Church Commissioners Schemes	Diocese of Liverpool: Christ Church, Padgate	
998	15/05/96	Buckingham Palace	Church Commissioners Schemes	Diocese of Norwich: Honing and Crostwight	
999	15/05/96	Buckingham Palace	Church Commissioners Schemes	Diocese of Oxford: Ardington and Lockinge	
1000	15/05/96	Buckingham Palace	Church Commissioners Schemes	Diocese of St. Albans: Meppershall	

== Since October 2000 ==
Orders made since October 2000 are listed at the Privy Council website.
