= Ellis v Lambeth LBC =

English adverse possession case

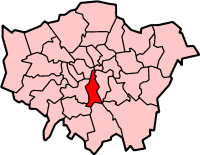
- A map showing the London Borough of Lambeth
- Court: Court of Appeal (Civil Division)
- Full case name: Timothy Ellis v London Borough of Lambeth
- Decided: 9 July 1999
- Citation: [1999] EWCA Civ 1807, (1999) 32 HLR 596

Court membership
- Judges sitting: Swinton Thomas LJ, Wilson J

Case opinions
- Held: Appeal dismissed. Ellis' failure to submit a registration form to the council did not interrupt the requisite 12 years of occupation, and his successful adverse possession claim upheld.

Keywords
- Adverse possession; Community charge; Estoppel; Possession orders; Squatting

Ellis v Lambeth LBC is an English land law case regarding adverse possession. which received significant media attention.

== Facts ==
Mr Ellis began occupying a house on Strathleven Road, Brixton, owned by Lambeth London Borough Council in July 1985, alongside other squatters. Four years later, he began exercising control over access to the property. The same year, Lambeth Council sent a registration form to Mr Ellis regarding Poll Tax. After the court held at first instance Mr Ellis had acquired the property through adverse possession, the council appealed on the ground that his failure to return the form constituted an interruption (by representing he was not residing at the property) to the 12 years of occupation necessary to make a claim of adverse possession.

== Judgment ==
In dismissing Lambeth's appeal, Wilson J upheld Mr Ellis' claim for adverse possession, confirming it met all the requirements under the Limitation Act 1980 (as found by the recorder). He dismissed the council's claim that failing to respond to a community charge form amounted to estoppel by representation and thus had not continuously occupied the property for the requisite 12 year period. His failure to return the form was held not hide his possession of the property and detriment for the estoppel claim could not be established on the facts. Furthermore, Lambeth LBC were aware of the squatting. The case also confirmed that property occupied with other squatters still constitutes exclusive possession when determining an adverse possession claim.

== In the media ==
Due to Mr Ellis' successful adverse possession claim and thus being awarded with freehold title of the property, his case attracted significant media attention highlighting the contention around squatting and adverse possession. An article published by BBC News reported the anger of neighbours at the decision and how the council was branded 'incompetent' by the judge at first instance. The Guardian described the fears over other 'copycat' attempts of adverse possession, as well as Mr Ellis' neighbours' "grudging admiration" for his method of acquiring the house

== See also ==
=== Notable adverse possession cases (England and Wales) ===
- Buckinghamshire CC v Moran [1990] Ch 623
- Dyer v Terry [2013] EWHC 4829 (Ch)
- Heaney v Kirkby [2015] UKUT 0178
- Red House Farms v Catchpole [1977] 2 EGLR 125
- Powell v McFarlane (1977) 38 P&CR 452
- Hounslow v Minchinton (1997) 74 P&CR 221
- Ellett-Brown v Tallishire Ltd [1990] 3 WLUK 430
- Carroll v Manek and Bank of India (2000) 79 P&CR 173
