= Weathersfield Ltd v Sargeant =

UK case on racial discrimination

Weathersfield Ltd v Sargent
- Court: Court of Appeal of England and Wales
- Decided: 10 December 1998
- Citations: [1998] EWCA Civ 1938, [1999] ICR 425, [1999] Disc LR 290, [1999] IRLR 94

Court membership
- Judges sitting: Beldam LJ, Swinton Thomas LJ and Pill LJ

Weathersfield Ltd v Sargent [1999] IRLR 94 is a UK labour law case concerning the scope of race discrimination.

== Facts ==
Mrs Sargent got a job at Weathersfield, a car-hire company. She was told that the firm had a special policy regarding coloured and Asians; "We have got to be careful who we hire the vehicles to. If you get a telephone call from any coloured or Asians you can usually tell them by the sound of their voice. You have to tell them that there are no vehicles available."

She was appalled, and she resigned. She claimed constructive unfair dismissal for race discrimination. The question was, although she was not herself black, was the treatment she has on grounds of race?

== Judgment ==
It was held that she could claim. The Employment Appeals Tribunal stated that “Mrs Sargent had been unfavourably treated by comparison with another person in the mere giving of the instruction because she, unlike that hypothetical other person, did not regard herself as being able to continue to work with employers who operated such a policy.”

In the Race Relations Act 1976 it says, "A person discriminates against another in any circumstances relevant for the purposes of any provision of this Act if (a) on racial grounds he treats that other less favourably than he treats or would treat other persons". Although Mrs Sargent was not herself coloured or Asian, the foul conduct of the employer was still "on racial grounds".

== See also ==
- Wilson v TB Steelwork Co Ltd (ET Case no. 23662/77) A white woman won a race discrimination claim after being refused a job because her husband was black.
- UK employment discrimination law
- UK labour law
