= Swinton Thomas =

British judge (1931–2016)

The Right Honourable Sir Swinton Thomas

Lord Justice of Appeal
- In office 1994–2000

Justice of the High Court

Personal details
- Born: Swinton Barclay Thomas

Sir Swinton Barclay Thomas (12 January 1931 – 12 August 2016) was a British judge, privy councillor, and the Interception of Communications Commissioner. He raised questions about the scope of the Wilson Doctrine.

He was born in Glasgow, the son of Brigadier William Bain Thomas CBE DSO of the Cameronians (Scottish Rifles), in which regiment Swinton carried out his National Service.

Thomas was a prominent Roman Catholic layman who served as chairman of the Association of Papal Orders in Great Britain.

Notable judgments of his included:

- Medforth v Blake
- Rock (Nominees) Ltd v RCO Holdings Ltd
- Weathersfield Ltd v Sargeant
