= Silven Properties Ltd v Royal Bank of Scotland plc =

Silven Properties Ltd v Royal Bank of Scotland
- Court: Court of Appeal
- Full case name: Silven Properties Ltd. & Anor v Royal Bank of Scotland Plc & Ors
- Decided: 21 October 2003
- Citations: [2003] EWCA Civ 1409, [2004] 4 All ER 484

Court membership
- Judges sitting: Aldous LJ, Tuckey LJ, Lightman J

Case opinions
- Decision by: Lightman J

Keywords
- Mortgage; arrears; repossession; reasonableness in conduct of sale

Silven Properties Ltd v Royal Bank of Scotland [2003] EWCA Civ 1409 is an English land law case, concerning the behaviour of receivers appointed under mortgages. It affirmed the proposition that a lender (and its agents or receivers) are not required to incur expenses that would likely delay a sale beyond the normal period of marketing.

== Facts ==
In 1996, Royal Bank of Scotland (RBS) appointed receivers over 33 properties mortgaged by Silven Properties to it, and proceeded to sell them off. The receivers explored planning and letting out the properties, but decided to sell them straight away. Silven alleged that RBS's receivers were under a duty to maximise the value by getting planning permission for development and letting out of vacant properties.

In the Chancery Division, Patten J held that neither the mortgagee nor receiver were required to incur expenses that would likely delay a sale beyond the normal period of marketing. This was supported by the cases of Cuckmere Brick Co v Mutual Finance, Downsview Nominees Ltd v First City Corporation Ltd, and Medforth v Blake.

== Judgment ==
Lightman J held that RBS had not breached its duty. A duty is owed in equity (rather than tort) but it was not breached on the facts.

- The mortgagee is entitled to sell the mortgaged property as it is, but is under no obligation to improve it or increase its value.
- The mortgagee is free (in his own interest as well as that of the mortgagor) to investigate whether and how he can "unlock" the potential for an increase in value of the property mortgaged, but he is likewise free at any time to halt his efforts and proceed instead immediately with a sale.
- If the mortgagor requires protection in any of these respects, whether by imposing further duties on the mortgagee or limitations on his rights and powers, he must insist upon them when the bargain is made and upon the inclusion of protective provisions in the mortgage. The one method available to the mortgagor to prevent the mortgagee from exercising his rights is to redeem the mortgage.

== Impact ==
Silven's reasoning was also held to apply to other forms of mortgages in Den Norske Bank ASA v Acemex Management Company Ltd. which was handed down several days later. As Longmore LJ noted in his ruling:

25. ... These statements of the law cannot be sidestepped by saying, in the case of a moveable chattel such as a ship that the mortgagee has to take care to sell at the place where the best price is available, because to transfer a chattel from one place to another will, inevitably, take time and mean that the sale is deferred. It is entirely different from a case where a short delay is appropriate so that a property can be properly advertised. The position might not be the same in cases where there is no true market for the chattel concerned at the place in which the mortgagee proposes to sell. It might, for example, be inappropriate to sell a valuable picture in Panama rather than in a recognised centre for the marketing of pictures. But, even then, there would be questions about the cost of transport which would have to be resolved....

== See also ==
- English land law
- English trusts law
- English property law
