= Menashe Business Mercantile Ltd v William Hill Organization Ltd =

Menashe Business Mercantile Ltd. & Anor v William Hill Organization Ltd
- Citation: [2002] EWCA Civ 1702
- Transcript: judgment

Court membership
- Judges sitting: LORD JUSTICE ALDOUS, LORD JUSTICE DYSON and Sir Denis Henry

Menashe Business Mercantile Ltd. & Anor v William Hill Organization Ltd. [2002] EWCA Civ 1702 was a patent case regarding Internet usage. The case addressed a European patent covering the United Kingdom for an invention referred to as "Interactive, computerized gaming system with remote control". Menashe sued William Hill, claiming that William Hill was infringing the patent by operating an online gaming system. William Hill's defence argued that it did not infringe the patent because the server on which it operated the system was located outside of the UK, in Antigua or Curaçao. Although accepting that their supply of software was in the UK and that this was an essential part of the invention, they further argued that the patent was for the parts of the system, and as one essential part of the system was not located in the UK, there could be no infringement.

This aspect of William Hill's case was tried at a preliminary issue before Mr. Justice Jacob in the High Court in 2002. Mr. Justice Jacob found against William Hill holding that the patent related to the entire system, being the sum of all its elements. Simply locating one part of the system abroad did not prevent infringement when the result was still providing UK punters with the system's benefits.

== See also ==
- Software patents under United Kingdom patent law
