= List of UK judgments relating to excluded subject matter =

Under United Kingdom patent law, a patent may only be granted for "an invention". While the meaning of invention is not defined, certain things are not regarded as inventions. Such things are excluded from patentability. This article lists judgments delivered by the UK courts that deal with excluded subject matter.

The provisions about what are not to be regarded as inventions are not easy. There has been and continues to be much debate about them and about decisions on them given by national courts and the Boards of Appeal of the European Patent Office. This article also list some of the discussions that have been had about the different judgments.

== Law ==
Article 52 of the European Patent Convention, which represents the source of UK law in this area and which should have the same meaning states that:

(1) European patents shall be granted for any inventions, in all fields of technology, provided that they are new, involve an inventive step and are susceptible of industrial application.
(2) The following in particular shall not be regarded as inventions within the meaning of paragraph 1:

(a) discoveries, scientific theories and mathematical methods;
(b) aesthetic creations;
(c) schemes, rules and methods for performing mental acts, playing games or doing business, and programs for computers;
(d) presentations of information.

(3) Paragraph 2 shall exclude the patentability of the subject-matter or activities referred to therein only to the extent to which a European patent application or European patent relates to such subject-matter or activities as such.

== By year ==
The following table lists judgments by year, although it is sortable by any of the other fields by activating the sort icon.

Year	Name	Court	Patent/application	Judgment	Appeal	Article
1987	Merrill Lynch's Application [1988] RPC 1	Patents Court	GB application 2180380	Computer program as such	[1989] RPC 561 - upheld, but for different reasons	Merrill Lynch
1987	Genentech's Patent [1987] RPC 553	Patents Court			[1989] RPC 147	Genentech's Patent
1989	Genentech's Patent [1989] RPC 147					Genentech's Patent
1989	Merrill Lynch's Application [1989] RPC 561	Court of Appeal	GB application 2180380	Business method as such	None	Merrill Lynch
1990	Gale's Application [1991] RPC 311	Patents Court	GB application 2174221	Not a computer program as such	[1991] RPC 305, 317 - overturned	Gale's Application
1990	Gale's Application [1991] RPC 305, 317	Court of Appeal	GB application 2174221	Mathematical method and computer program as such	None	Gale's Application
1991	Wang's application [1991] RPC 463					
1993	Raytheon's application [1993] RPC 427					
1996	Fujitsu's Application [1996] RPC 511	High Court			[1997] EWCA 1174 (Civ) - upheld but for different reasons	Fujitsu's Application
1997	Fujitsu's Application [1997] EWCA Civ 1174 (6 March 1997)	Court of Appeal		Computer program as such	None	Fujitsu's Application
2001	Amgen Parties v Roche Parties [2001] EWHC 433 (Patents) (11 April 2001)	Patents Court	EP 0148605B	Not a discovery as such	Not appealed directly, but several related cases including an HoL decision	Kirin-Amgen v Hoechst Marion Roussel
2005	CFPH LLC's Applications [2005] EWHC 1589 (Patents) (21 July 2005)	Patents Court		Business method as such	None	CFPH LLC's Applications

=== 1993 ===
- Lux Traffic Controls v Pike Signals [1993] RPC 107 (per Aldous J)

=== 1996 ===
- Biogen Inc v. Medeva Plc [1996] UKHL 18 (31 October 1996)

=== 2005 ===
- Halliburton Energy Services, Inc. v Smith International (North Sea) Ltd & Ors [2005] EWHC 1623 (Patents) (21 July 2005)
- Crawford's Application [2005] EWHC 2417 (Patents) (4 November 2005)
- Shoppalotto.com's Application [2005] EWHC 2416 (Patents) (7 November 2005)

=== 2006 ===
- Research In Motion UK Ltd. v Inpro Licensing SARL [2006] EWHC 70 (Patents) (2 February 2006)
- Neal William Macrossan's Application [2006] EWHC 705 (Ch) (3 April 2006) - upheld on appeal
- Aerotel Ltd v Telco Holdings Ltd [2006] EWHC 997 (Patents) (3 May 2006) - overruled on appeal
- Aerotel Ltd v Telco Holdings Ltd & Ors and Neal William Macrossan's Application [2006] EWCA Civ 1371 (27 October 2006)

=== 2007 ===
- Oneida Indian Nation's application [2007] EWHC 954 (Patents) (2 May 2007)

=== 2008 ===
- Astron Clinica Ltd & Ors v The Comptroller General of Patents, Designs and Trade Marks [2008] EWHC 85 (Patents) (25 January 2008)
- Autonomy Corporation Ltd v The Comptroller General of Patents, Trade Marks & Designs [2008] EWHC 146 (Patents) (6 February 2008)
- Research In Motion UK Ltd v Visto Corporation [2008] EWHC 335 (Patents) (28 February 2008)
- Symbian Ltd v Comptroller General Of Patents [2008] EWHC 518 (Patents) (18 March 2008)
- IGT / Acres Gaming Inc's Patent Application [2008] EWHC 568 (Patents) (19 March 2008)
- Kapur v Comptroller General of Patents, Designs & Trade Marks [2008] EWHC 649 (Patents) (10 April 2008)
- Aerotel Ltd v Wavecrest Group Enterprises Limited [2008] EWHC 1180 (Patents) (23 May 2008)
- Symbian Ltd v Comptroller General Of Patents [2008] EWCA Civ 1066 (8 October 2008)

=== 2009 ===
- AT&T Knowledge Ventures LP and CVON Innovations Limited v Comptroller General Of Patents [2009] EWHC 343 (Patents) (3 March 2009)
- Tate & Lyle Technology Limited v Roquette Frères [2009] EWHC 1312 (Patents) (16 June 2009)
- Cranway Ltd v Playtech Ltd and others [2009] EWHC 1588 (Patents) (7 July 2009)

=== 2011 ===
- Re Halliburton Energy Services Inc [2011] EWHC 2508 (Patents) (5 October 2011)

=== 2013 ===
- HTC Europe Co Ltd v Apple Inc (Rev 1) [2013] EWCA Civ 451 (3 May 2013)
- Lantana Ltd v The Comptroller-General of Patents, Designs and Trade Marks [2013] EWHC 2673 (Patents) (4 September 2013)

== By subject matter ==
The following table lists judgments and the different categories of excluded subject matter that are discussed within that judgment.

- Categories in blue were not discussed in the judgment.
- Categories in yellow were discussed but not judged on.
- Categories in green were judged on but the (alleged) invention was found not to fall into that category.
- Categories in red were judged on and the (alleged) invention was found to fall into that category; hence the claimed invention was excluded.

Year	Judgment	Discoveries	Scientific theories	Mathematical methods	Aesthetic creations	Mental acts	Playing games	Doing business	Programs for computers	Presentations of information	Appeal
1987	Merrill Lynch's Application [1988] RPC 1										[1989] RPC 561 - upheld, but for different reasons
1987	Genentech's Patent [1987] RPC 553										[1989] RPC 147
1989	Genentech's Patent [1989] RPC 147										None
1989	Merrill Lynch's Application [1989] RPC 561	discussed but not judged on		discussed but not judged on				business method as such	discussed but not judged on		None
1990	Gale's Application [1991] RPC 311			not a mathematical method as such					not a computer program as such		[1991] RPC 305, 317 - overturned
1990	Gale's Application [1991] RPC 305, 317	discussed but not judged on		mathematical method as such					computer program as such		None
1991	Wang's application [1991] RPC 463										
1993	Raytheon's application [1993] RPC 427										
1997	Fujitsu's Application [1997] EWCA Civ 1174 (6 March 1997)			discussed but not judged on		discussed but not judged on			computer program as such		None
2005	CFPH LLC's Applications [2005] EWHC 1589 (Patents) (21 July 2005)	discussed but not judged on		discussed but not judged on	discussed but not judged on		discussed but not judged on	business method as such	discussed but not judged on	discussed but not judged on	None
2005	Halliburton Energy Services, Inc. v Smith International (North Sea) Ltd & Ors [2005] EWHC 1623 (Patents) (21 July 2005)					mental act as such, but correctable defect					Appeal filed, but not on this point
2005	Crawford's Application [2005] EWHC 2417 (Patents) (4 November 2005)										None
2005	Shoppalotto.com's Application [2005] EWHC 2416 (Patents) (7 November 2005)										None
2009	Tate & Lyle Technology Limited v Roquette Frères [2009] EWHC 1312 (Patents) (16 June 2009)	Discovery as such									None

== Discussions ==
Lawyers, patent attorneys and economists have often debated the effects of the judgments listed above. A list of some papers and articles is provided below. Many of these papers discuss more than one judgment, but they have been ordered according to their primary focus, if there is one.

=== Fujitsu's Application ===
- Software Patents After Fujitsu. New Directions or (another) Missed Opportunity?, Ian Lloyd, University of Strathclyde. Alternative link
- IP/IT Update Patents Case Note: Fujitsu Ltd's Application

=== CFPH's Applications ===
- A Step Forward? Excluding "Technical" From the Test for Patentable Subject Matter
- Consensus Forms? High Court Approach to the Patentability of Computer Programs and Business Methods

=== Aerotel v Telco and Macrossan's Application ===
- COURT OF APPEAL ISSUES EAGERLY-AWAITED AEROTEL/MACROSSAN DECISION CONCERNING THE PATENTABILITY OF COMPUTER PROGRAM AND BUSINESS METHOD INVENTIONS
- Thought policing, Alan Johnson, David Brown and James Boon, Bristows

=== Multi-judgment discussions ===
- Inherent Patentability as related to computer software
- Is the extension of the patent system to include software related inventions desirable?
- Intellectual Property - Special Interest Group: The edge of reason - boundaries to what can be patented

== Key ==
- RPC = Reports of Patent, Design and Trade Mark Cases
- Patents / Pat = Patents Court
- EWHC = England and Wales High Court
- Ch = Chancery Division
- EWCA / CA = Court of Appeal
- Civ = Civil Division

== See also ==
- List of decisions of the EPO Boards of Appeal relating to Article 52(2) and (3) EPC
- Software patents under United Kingdom patent law
