= Cuckmere Brick Co Ltd v Mutual Finance Ltd =

1971 English tort law case

Cuckmere Brick Co v Mutual Finance
- Court: Court of Appeal of England and Wales
- Full case name: Cuckmere Brick Company Ltd and Leslie Arthur Fawke v Mutual Finance Limited
- Decided: 25 February 1971
- Citations: [1971] EWCA Civ 9 [1971] Ch 949 [1971] 2 All ER 633 [1971] 2 WLR 1207

Case history
- Prior action: The appellant (defendant bank) lost at first instance
- Appealed from: High Court (Plowman J)

Case opinions
- Salmon LJ thought no inquiry as to damages necessary and would have accepted the rough figure awarded by Plowman J. Concurring judgments as to all other elements of Cross and Cairns LJJ
- Decision by: Salmon LJ
- Concurrence: Cross LJ and Cairns LJ

Keywords
- Mortgage; auction particulars; planning permissions

Cuckmere Brick Co v Mutual Finance [1971] EWCA Civ 9 is an English tort law case, establishing the lender must publish/promote the materially beneficial key, intrinsic facts as to land in mortgage repossession sales. As it affects the duty of mortgagees (secured lenders), to that extent it can be considered within the periphery of English land law also.

The tripartite panel at appeal established negligence on the part of the lender or its auctioneer agent. A 2–1 majority directed an enquiry as to damages (as opposed to rough award ordered at first instance) to be carried out.

== Facts ==
In 1961, Cuckmere Brick Co had received planning permission to build 100 flats each with a garage on a site of 2.65 acres (1.07 ha) near Maidstone, and received £50,000 mortgage financing from Mutual Finance who valued the land accordingly. By 1964, due to cash flow problems arising from other developments in which Cuckmere was involved, planning permission was subsequently received (with Mutual's approval) to build 35 houses, which would have incurred lower construction costs. Construction had still not commenced by 1966, and Mutual exercised power of sale under the mortgage, putting the land up for auction, and advertising that the property had planning permission for the houses, but not the flats. Cuckmere advised Mutual of the oversight, and the latter told the auctioneer to mention it. They got £44,000 at the auction, and Cuckmere argued that it should have been closer to £75,000 had the planning permission been mentioned properly in the advertisement, indeed had its existence, underpinning the bank's own valuation, been imparted to prospective buyers.

Cuckmere sued, asking for an account to be taken on the basis that the defendants should be debited with the price which they could and should have obtained for the site. Mutual counter-claimed for the balance of all moneys due under the mortgage with interest after crediting the plaintiffs with the proceeds of the sale. Plowman J found for the plaintiffs on the claim so as to eclipse the value of the counterclaim, accepting credible evidence that £65,000 was the price that could and should have been obtained for the land but for the defendants' default or failure to take reasonable precautions in relation to the sale.

Both parties appealed to the Court of Appeal.

== Judgment ==
The appeal was allowed in part, being sent back to an inquiry as to damages, potentially to lower those awarded. The respondent borrower was awarded 3/4 of the costs of the appeal.

Generally agreeing on the applicable test, two Lord Justices of Appeal saw the case was returned for an inquiry as to damages, on the basis that the price at which the land could probably have been sold was still unclear (one judge used the fading language, "at large"), the third would have fully upheld the original damages award.

Salmon LJ held that Mutual Finance had breached its duty of care to Cuckmere. The duty is not to get the best or proper price, whatever that means, but ‘the true market value.’ This was the proposition of earlier High Court decision in Tomlin v Luce (1890) (the case was "followed").

It is well settled that a mortgagee is not a trustee of the power of sale for the mortgagor. Once the power has accrued, the mortgagee is entitled to exercise it for his own purposes whenever he chooses to do so. It matters not that the moment may be unpropitious and that by waiting a higher price could be obtained. He has the right to realise his security by turning it into money when he likes. Nor, in my view, is there anything to prevent a mortgagee from accepting the best bid he can get at an auction, even though the auction is badly attended and the bidding exceptionally low, Providing none of those adverse factors is due to any fault of the mortgagee, he can do as he likes. If the mortgagee's interests, as he sees them, conflict with those of the mortgagor, the mortgagee can give preference to his own interests, which of course he could not do were he a trustee of the power of sale for the mortgagor.

[...]

The mortgagor is vitally affected by the result of the sale but its preparation and conduct is left entirely in the hands of the mortgagee. The proximity between them could scarcely be closer. Surely they are "neighbours".

[...]

I accordingly conclude...that a mortgagee in exercising his power of sale does owe a duty to take reasonable precaution to obtain the true market value of the mortgaged property at the date on which he decides to sell it. No doubt in deciding whether he has fallen short of that duty, the facts must be looked at broadly and he will not be adjudged to be in default unless he is plainly on the wrong side of the line.

Cross LJ agreed that the lender was also responsible for the conduct of its agent (the auctioneer) and either or both were negligent:

...Counsel for the appellants further submitted that even if we should be of opinion that a mortgagee was liable to account to the mortgagor for loss occasioned by his own negligence in the exercise of his power of sale, it was not right that he should be liable for the negligence of an agent reasonably employed by him. It may well be that this point is not open to him in view of the way the argument proceeded below - but in any case I do not accept the submission. In support of it, counsel pointed out that a trustee is not liable for the default of an agent whom it is reasonable for him to employ. But the position of a mortgagee is quite different from that of a trustee. A trustee has not, qua [in his capacity as] trustee, any interest in the trust property, and if an agent employed by him is negligent his right of action against the agent is an asset of the trust. A mortgagee, on the other hand, is not a trustee and if he sues the agent for negligence any damages which he can recover belong to him....

Equally Cairns LJ:

The issues in this appeal are:

1. Does the duty of a mortgagee to a mortgagor on the sale of the mortgaged property include a duty to take reasonable care to obtain a proper price or is it sufficient for the mortgagee to act honestly and without a reckless disregard of the interests of the mortgagor?
2. Was the advertising of the auction without reference to the planning permission for flats
  (a) right
  (b) an error of judgment
  (c) negligent or
  (d) reckless?
3. A similar question in relation to the refusal to postpone the auction.
4. If anybody on the defendants' side was at fault, was the fault that of the defendants themselves or of their agents Geering & Colyer, or both?
5. If the fault was that of the agents only, can it be attributed to the defendants?
6. If there was negligence for which the defendants are responsible did the plaintiffs suffer any damage thereby?
7. If so, what value is to be attributed to the land in assessing the damages?
1. ...I therefore consider that Tomlin v. Luce is the stronger authority and I would hold that the present defendants had a duty to take reasonable care to obtain a proper price for the land in the interest of the mortgagors.
2. ...There was no deliberate decision not to mention flats. There was simply a failure to consider the desirability of doing so. On the evidence of Mr. Dann and Mr. St.John this was at least an error of judgment
  ...It would have been the simplest thing in the world to mention the flats permission in the brochure. It could have done no harm. It might have attracted a purchaser whose ideas of the prospects of disposing of flats...I conclude that there was negligence in omitting it.
  Whatever lapse there may have been in the exercise of skill and judgment, I cannot think that the evidence pointed to a reckless disregard of the interests of either party.
3. ...And if it was negligent not to advertise the permission in the first instance then it was negligent not to postpone the auction and re-advertise. Not that there were no good reasons for pressing on with the sale: interest was accruing every day...
4. ...In my view there was at both stages negligence on the part of both the defendants and their agents.
5. ... If it were open [to argue the lender is not liable for any negligence of their agents] I should need more argument to satisfy me that Mr. Justice Kekewich and Lord Justice Cotton were wrong.
6. ...in the court below there was a failure to distinguish between the question of whether there was a reasonable chance that people interested in buying for flats would have attended...from the general evidence of [experts for the plaintiff]...if people had come to the sale with a view to buying for flats somebody would have thought that the land was worth more than £44,000 and would have raised that bid. So...the plaintiffs suffered some damage...
7. ...They called no flat-developer to say he would have offered £65,000 for the land. No doubt if Mr. Dann or Mr. St. John had been consulted they would have advised paying that price but it may well be that other advisers would have been more cautious or that the developers would have realised how shaky that valuation was and would have refrained from bidding so high. To establish the figure of £65,000 it is necessary to assume the presence at the auction of at least two flat-developers who would have bid against each other to push up the price to that extent.

In my view the learned judge was wrong to accede to the request to assess the figure on the materials before him, though I can well understand his doing so as the request was a joint one....there should be an inquiry as to damages on the footing that the price at which the land could probably have been sold is at large. I would so direct.

== Followed or applied in ==
- Bishop v Bonham [1988] CA (England and Wales) ("E")
- AIB Finance Ltd v Debtors [1997]
- Meftah v Lloyds TSB Bank plc [2001]
- Aodhcon LLP v Bridgeco Ltd [2014] Ch.D.

== Dictum followed in ==
- American Express International Banking Corp v Hurley, [1985] 3 All ER 564

== Considered in ==
- Medforth v Blake [1999] EWCA Civ 1482, [1999] 2 BCLC 221 (26 May 1999)
- Parker-Tweedale v Dunbar Bank Plc, [1991] Ch 12
- Tse Kwong Lam v Wong Chit Sen [1983] UKPC 28, [1983] 3 All ER 54 (25 July 1983) (on appeal from Hong Kong)
- Latchford v Beirne, [1981] 3 All ER 705 (QB)

== Explained by the Privy Council in ==
- Downsview Nominees Ltd v First City Corp Ltd [1992] UKPC 34, [1993] AC 295 (19 November 1992) (on appeal from New Zealand)

== See also ==
- English land law
- English trusts law
- English property law
