= Aerotel Ltd v Telco Holdings Ltd =

2006 English court case

Aerotel v Telco and Macrossan's Application
- Court: Court of Appeal of England and Wales
- Full case name: Aerotel Ltd (a company incorporated under the laws of Israel) v. Telco Holdings Ltd, Telco Global Distribution Ltd, Telco Global Ltd; And In the Matter of: The Patents Act 1977; And in the Matter of Patent Application GB 0314464.9 in the name of Neal William Macrossan
- Decided: October 27, 2006
- Citation: [2006] EWCA Civ 1371
- Transcript: [2006] EWHC 997 (Pat) [2006] EWCA Civ 1371

Court membership
- Judges sitting: Chadwick LJ, Jacob LJ, Neuberger LJ

Case opinions
- Decision by: Jacob LJ

Keywords
- software patent

Aerotel v Telco and Macrossan's Application is a judgment by the Court of Appeal of England and Wales. The judgment was passed down on 27 October 2006 and relates to two different appeals from decisions of the High Court. The first case involved patent GB 2171877 granted to Aerotel Ltd and their infringement action against Telco Holdings Ltd and others. The second case concerned patent GB application 2388937 filed by Neal Macrossan but refused by the UK Patent Office (now operating as the UK Intellectual Property Office).

The reasoning in the judgment forms the basis for the current practice of the UK Intellectual Property Office, when assessing whether patent applications are for patentable subject matter.

The approach applied in the judgment has been criticized by a Board of Appeal of the European Patent Office (EPO) as being "irreconcilable with the European Patent Convention".

On 11 February 2026, the judgment in Emotional Perception AI Ltd v Comptroller General of Patents by the Supreme Court of the United Kingdom overturned the approach in Aerotel in favour of the EPO-style test.

== History ==
=== Aerotel's patent ===
==== Application procedure ====
Zvi Kamil, an Israeli inventor, filed his UK patent application number 8600691 for a "telephone system" on 13 January 1986, claiming priority from two previous Israeli patent applications filed on 13 January 1985 and 10 November 1985. The application related to a "special" telephone exchange. A caller has an account with the owner of that exchange and deposits a credit with him. The caller has a code. To make a call he calls the number of the special exchange and inputs his code and then the callee's number. If the code is verified and there is enough credit he is put through: the call will be terminated if his credit runs out.

The application was published as GB application 2171877 on 3 September 1986 and the patent was granted with effect from 21 December 1988. Kamil assigned his patent to Aerotel Limited on 12 April 1999. The patent expired on 12 January 2006.

==== High Court ====
Aerotel sued Telco Holdings Limited for patent infringement in February 2005 and Telco counterclaimed for revocation of the patent. The action started in the Patents County Court, but HHJ Fysh QC transferred it to the High Court in November 2005. In February 2006, Telco applied for summary judgment on its counterclaim, basing the application on the exclusion to patentability. This application succeeded before Lewison J who ordered revocation of the patent on 3 May 2006. The patent was later restored under appeal, but then re-revoked at the subsequent hearing by HHJ Fysh QC on 23 May 2008.

=== Macrossan's application ===
==== Application procedure ====
Macrossan's GB application 2388937 has a December 2000 priority date. It was for a new automated method of acquiring the documents necessary to incorporate a company. It involved a user sitting at a computer and communicating with a remote server, answering questions. By posing questions to the user in a number of stages, enough information was gleaned from the user's answers to produce the required documents. Questions posed in the second and subsequent stages were determined from previous answers provided and the user's answers were stored in a database structure. This process was repeated until the user had provided enough information to allow the documents legally required to create the corporate entity to be generated. A number of document templates were also stored and the data processor was configured to merge at least one of these templates with the user's answers to generate the required legal documents. The documents could then be sent to the user in an electronic form for the user to print out and submit, mailed to the user, or submitted to the appropriate registration authority on behalf of the user.

The UK patent office did find that Macrossan's process was both novel and involved an inventive step, but nonetheless rejected the application for a patent since the claimed subject matter was not patentable subject matter under UK patent law. The UK patent examiner found that the claims related to a method for doing business and a computer program as such.

Macrossan sought a review of the patent examiner's finding, by way of a hearing before a UKPO hearing officer - she held that the application related to a computer program as such, a method for doing business as such, and a method for performing a mental act as such, and thus was excluded from patentability on each of those three grounds.

==== High Court ====
Macrossan then appealed to the High Court. The High Court concurred in finding that the application related to a computer program as such, and to a method for performing a mental act as such and was unpatentable for each of those two reasons. However, the High Court specifically overruled the UKPO hearing officer on one of the three grounds of exclusion, by holding that the application did not relate to a method of doing business as such.

== Judgment ==
The judgment approved a new four-step test to be used when assessing whether or not an application actually describes an invention. The four-step test is as follows:

- Properly construe the claim;
- Identify the actual contribution;
- Ask whether the contribution falls solely within excluded subject matter; and
- Check whether the contribution is technical in nature.

The second step, that of identifying the contribution, was highlighted as being the most problematic since it may be difficult to determine what the contribution actually is.

=== Aerotel v Telco ===
Aerotel's patent was found to relate to a patentable invention in principle because the system as a whole was new in itself, not merely because it is to be used for the business of selling phone calls. While this system could be implemented using conventional computers, the key to it was a new physical combination of hardware. The judge felt that this was clearly more than just a method of doing business as such. The method claims were construed as relating to a use of the new system and were also deemed to relate to a patentable invention in principle. The additional questions of whether the claimed invention was novel and involved an inventive step were not considered directly by the judge, although the implication is that the invention was at least novel.

=== Macrossan's application ===
In relation to Macrossan's patent application, it was held that the subject matter was unpatentable on the grounds of the computer program and business method exclusions. However, in relation to the mental act exclusion, the Court of Appeal made no specific finding.

=== Reasoning ===
In both cases, the judgment does not explain in detail how the contributions provided by the claimed inventions were identified and provides little guidance for how the second step of the test could be carried out in other cases. Instead, the reader is directed to the lengthy summary of past case law that is included as an Appendix to the judgment to understand the reasoning of the judges fully. Based on this summary of the case law, the judgment rejects the notion set out in the earlier judgment concerning Fujitsu's Application that the UK Courts should be guided by the case law of the EPO since the judges were of the opinion that EPO case law was too unsettled.

The judgment briefly mentions the TRIPS agreement and the fact that its lack of a list of exclusions from patentability and its requirement that patents should be available in "all fields of technology" puts political pressure on Europe to remove or reduce the categories of non-inventions. However, Jacob had previously ruled that TRIPS does not have direct effect on UK law and thus did not affect the case in question. Instead, cases relating to the exclusions from patentability must be decided by simply trying to make sense of the language of the EPC without bias for or against exclusion.

== Appeal to House of Lords ==
Citing as reasons a clear divergence in reasoning between the UK courts and the European Patent Office, Neal Macrossan sought leave to appeal the refusal of his patent application to the House of Lords. Within the patent profession it was hoped that a ruling by the House of Lords would clarify the extent to which patent protection is available to computer-implemented inventions. The House of Lords had already tackled fundamental questions such as novelty, inventive step, claim construction and sufficiency during 2004 and 2005.

The House of Lords refused leave to hear the appeal, citing the reason that the case "does not raise an arguable point of law of general public importance".

Some patent attorneys have expressed surprise at this decision since, while the merits of Macrossan's case might have been arguable, it was felt that there are issues with the law that require resolving. Consequently, there is disappointment at this missed opportunity to better establish where the boundary lies between patentable and non-patentable software. The Foundation for a Free Information Infrastructure have expressed the view that the decision of the House of Lords confirms the correctness of the Court of Appeal.

== Parallel procedure before the European Patent Office ==
A European patent application, namely EP application 1346304, in the patent family of patent application GB 2388937 filed by Macrossan, was pending at the European Patent Office (EPO).

On Monday 30 October 2006 (the first business day following the handing down of the Court of Appeal's judgment on Friday 27 October 2006), the Search Division of the EPO in charge of establishing a search report for the European patent application issued a declaration under Rule 45 EPC 1973 (now Rule 63 EPC) that a search could not be established. The declaration indicates that the EPO search examiner is of the opinion that Macrossan's application contains nothing of technical merit, but only commonplace technical features (i.e. a computer) for implementing a business method. As a consequence, no meaningful search was considered to be possible. Before a substantive examination report was issued, the application was deemed to be withdrawn in October 2009 after Macrossan failed to pay a maintenance fee.

== Effect on UK practice ==
Following this judgment, the UK Patent Office (now the UK Intellectual Property Office) issued a Practice Note on 2 November 2006 announcing an immediate change in the way patent examiners will assess whether inventions relate to patentable subject matter. The Patent Office also prepared four case studies as examples of how they saw the test being applied in practice.

One change in practice that occurred was that claims to a computer program were rejected on the basis of the form of the claim, even if the process that was performed by the computer program was itself considered to be patentable. This new practice was challenged by Astron Clinica Ltd and others and the UK Patents Court judged that the practice was incorrect.

== Comparison of EPO and UK practice ==
The judgment proposes several questions to be put to the Enlarged Board of Appeal in an effort to resolve perceived conflicts between the different decisions of the Boards of Appeal. In response to this, Alain Pompidou, then president of the European Patent Office (EPO), wrote to Lord Justice Jacob to say that while clarification of certain issues relating to excluded subject matter would be welcomed, there were currently insufficient differences between relevant Board of Appeal decisions that would justify a referral. Instead, a referral would be appropriate if the approach taken by one Board of Appeal would lead to the grant of a patent whereas the approach taken by another Board would not. On 22 October 2008, Pompidou's successor Alison Brimelow did refer a number of questions to the Enlarged Board. In its opinion G 3/08, the Enlarged Board rejected the referral as inadmissible.

The practice of the EPO to deem non-technical subject matter, such as new music or a story, as part of the prior art was criticised in the judgment as not being intellectually honest. A similar criticism was also raised during appeal T 1284/04, in response to which the EPO Board of Appeal stated that:

the COMVIK approach does not consider the non-technical constraints as belonging to the prior art, but rather as belonging to the conception or motivation phase normally preceding an invention since they may lead to a technical problem without contributing to its solution. Such aspects have never been taken into account for assessing inventive step, irrespective of whether or not they were known from the prior art.

The EPO Boards of Appeal, in T 154/04 further states that the examination of whether there is an invention within the meaning of Article 52(1) to (3) EPC has to be strictly separated from and not mixed up with the other three patentability requirements referred to in Article 52(1) EPC.

This distinction abstracts the concept of "invention" as a general and absolute requirement of patentability from the relative criteria novelty and inventive step, which in an ordinary popular sense are understood to be the attributes of any invention (...).

In relation to the "ordinary popular sense" according to which novelty and inventive step are understood to be attributes of all inventions and in relation to the corresponding meaning of the term invention, the Board considered that:

The "technical effect approach" endorsed by Lord Justice Jacob in the Aerotel/Macrossan judgement (...) seems to be rooted in this second ordinary meaning of the term invention, a practice which might be understandable "given the shape of the old law" (Lord Justice Mustill, loc.cit.), but which is not consistent with a good-faith interpretation of the European Patent Convention in accordance with Article 31 of the Vienna Convention on the Law of Treaties of 1969.

The "contribution" or "technical effect" approach followed in the Aerotel/Macrossan judgement was abandoned by the Boards of Appeal of the EPO ten years ago and the board in T 154/04 confirmed that there were "convincing reasons" for abandoning this approach.

The Board further considered that

The "technical effect approach (with the rider)" applied in the Aerotel/Macrossan judgement is irreconcilable with the European Patent Convention also for the further reason that it presupposes that "novel and inventive purely excluded matter does not count as a 'technical contribution'" (Aerotel/Macrossan, e.g. paragraph No. 26(2)). This has no basis in the Convention and contravenes conventional patentability criteria (...)"

== See also ==
- Business method patent
- List of UK judgments relating to excluded subject matter
- Software patent
