= British Telecommunications plc v One in a Million Ltd =

English cybersquatting court case

British Telecommunications plc v One in a Million Ltd [1998] EWCA Civ 1272, [1999] 1 WLR 903 is a leading case concerning cybersquatting, passing off and trademark infringement. The Court of Appeal of England and Wales upheld injunctions against domain name dealers who had registered domain names incorporating the names and trademarks of well-known companies.

== Background ==
One in a Million Ltd was a company controlled by Richard Conway and Julian Nicholson. Conway and Nicholson also traded through Global Media Communications and Junic. They dealt in Internet domain names and registered names incorporating well-known company names and trade marks without the consent of the owners.

Five actions were brought against them by Marks & Spencer, Ladbrokes, Sainsbury's, Virgin, British Telecommunications and Telecom Securicor Cellular Radio, which operated the Cellnet mobile network.

The disputed registrations included marksandspencer.com, marksandspencer.co.uk, ladbrokes.com, sainsbury.com, sainsburys.com, j-sainsbury.com, virgin.org, cellnet.net, bt.org, britishtelecom.com, britishtelecom.co.uk and britishtelecom.net.

The defendants said that they registered domain names with a view to making a profit, either by selling them to the businesses whose names they incorporated, retaining them as blocking registrations, or selling them to collectors or others who might have a legitimate reason to use them.

Their previous dealings were relied upon as evidence of their intentions. In September 1996, Conway offered to sell burgerking.co.uk to Burger King for £25,000 plus VAT, stating that if the company did not buy it the domain would remain available for sale to another party. The defendants also offered bt.org to British Telecommunications for £4,700 plus VAT.

British Telecommunications had already taken action against Conway over britishtelecom.co.uk and britishtelecom.net. In November 1996 he gave written undertakings to cease using the domains, transfer them to BT and refrain from registering further domain names containing "British Telecom" or, where it might reasonably refer to the company, "BT". Despite the undertakings, Junic registered britishtelecom.com in March 1997 and One in a Million registered bt.org in May.

When BT objected to bt.org, One in a Million initially said that it had been registered for a client whose initials were BT. Following further correspondence, it offered to sell bt.org to British Telecommunications for £4,700 plus VAT together with cellnet.net for $100. They also offered "tandy.co.uk" along with "intertan.co.uk", "tandy.net", "intertan.net", "tandyuk.com" and "intertanuk.com" to InterTAN for £15,000 + VAT in September 1996.

One in a Million had registered more than 100 domain names incorporating prominent names. Conway and Nicholson maintained that they were dealing in domain names rather than impersonating the businesses concerned. Other domains registered by them included "spice-girls.net" and "buckinghampalace.org", while Global Media offered domains including "macdonalds.co.uk", "sundaytimes.co.uk" and "thetimes.co.uk".

== High Court ==
The five actions were heard together by Jonathan Sumption QC, sitting as a deputy judge of the High Court of Justice. On 28 November 1997, he granted summary judgment under Order 14 in favour of the claimants.

The defendants argued that the registration of a domain name did not itself constitute passing off because they had not used the domains to impersonate the claimants. They suggested that a domain could, for example, simply be retained as a blocking registration without ever being used.

Sumption accepted that the mere creation of an "instrument of deception", without its use for deception or supply to another for that purpose, was not itself passing off. He rejected the proposition that English law contained a separate tort equivalent to "going equipped for passing off". The issue, however, was whether the defendants' conduct demonstrated a sufficiently clear threat of future passing off for the court to intervene before it occurred.

He considered marksandspencer.com particularly distinctive. Marks & Spencer was a household name and the commercial value of a domain incorporating it derived from its association with the retailer. A person encountering a website at such an address would naturally be likely to assume that it belonged to or was connected with Marks & Spencer.

Sumption also considered the defendants' wider pattern of conduct. He found that they had deliberately registered domain names resembling the names and marks of other businesses over a substantial period. Although the defendants described some of the registrations as blocking registrations, their value depended upon the goodwill in the names and upon the possibility of extracting payment from those who owned that goodwill.

The claimants also relied on section 10(3) of the Trade Marks Act 1994. Sumption held that the defendants were professional dealers in domain names and that using a trade mark in the course of that business to increase the value of a domain and obtain money from the trade mark owner amounted to use "in the course of trade".

He concluded that the threat of passing off and trade mark infringement had been established and granted final quia timet injunctions in all five actions. The defendants were ordered to take steps to assign the disputed domain names to the claimants and to pay £65,000 towards their legal costs.

== Court of Appeal ==
The appeals were heard together by Stuart-Smith LJ, Swinton Thomas LJ and Aldous LJ in the Court of Appeal. Judgment was delivered on 23 July 1998, with Aldous LJ giving the principal judgment and the other two judges agreeing.

The defendants maintained that the domain names could potentially be used without passing off. Some of the names were not exclusively associated with the claimants: Sainsbury and Ladbroke were surnames, "Virgin" could be used by other businesses and "BT" could be the initials of an unrelated person or organisation. They argued that registration alone therefore did not justify an injunction.

In the case of Marks & Spencer, Aldous LJ went further than the High Court. He held that registration of a distinctive name such as marksandspencer could itself amount to a false representation. A person carrying out a WHOIS search and finding One in a Million recorded as registrant could conclude that it was connected with Marks & Spencer. The registration also eroded the exclusivity of the goodwill attached to the name.

For the other registrations, the Court of Appeal considered the defendants' intentions and conduct. Aldous LJ drew upon earlier passing-off cases involving objects or names created for fraudulent use and held that the court could intervene where a defendant had equipped himself, or intended to equip another person, with an "instrument of fraud".

Whether a name amounted to an instrument of fraud depended upon all the circumstances, including the similarity between the names, the intention of the defendant, the nature of the trade and the surrounding facts. The fact that a domain name might conceivably have an innocent use did not prevent an injunction where the evidence showed that it had been registered for an improper purpose.

The court found clear evidence of systematic registration of well-known trade names. Aldous LJ held that the primary purpose of the registrations was to use the goodwill attached to those names to extract money from their owners, supported by an express or implied threat that the domains could otherwise be used or sold to somebody who could exploit that goodwill.

The Court of Appeal also upheld the decision under the Trade Marks Act 1994. The domains had been registered to take advantage of the distinctive character and reputation of the claimants' marks, and the threatened uses were capable of amounting to trade mark infringement.

The appeals were dismissed with costs.

== Significance ==
One in a Million was one of the earliest major British cases concerning what later became widely known as cybersquatting. The High Court proceedings were the first legal action of their kind in the United Kingdom, and the Court of Appeal decision was reported as a landmark ruling on the use of corporate names as Internet domains.

The decision became a leading authority on the application of passing off to domain names. In 2001, legal academic Rachel Keane described British Telecommunications v One in a Million as the leading British case concerning conflicts between domain names and trade marks. The "instrument of fraud" principle has subsequently been considered in later English cases involving domain names, and the decision has also been cited in proceedings under the Uniform Domain-Name Dispute-Resolution Policy.
