= Medforth v Blake =

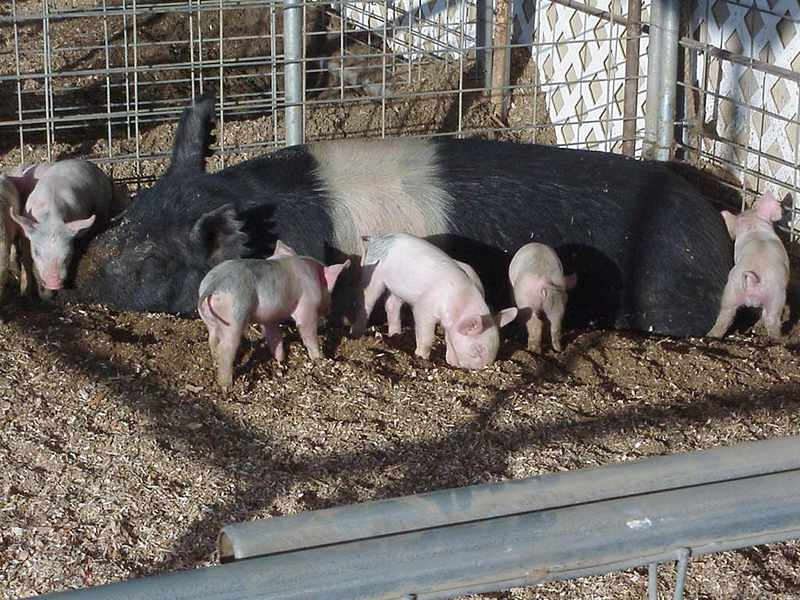
- Court: Court of Appeal
- Full case name: Medforth v Blake & Ors
- Decided: 26 May 1999
- Citations: [1999] EWCA Civ 1482, [2000] Ch 86

Court membership
- Judges sitting: Scott VC, Thomas LJ, Tuckey LJ

Case opinions
- Decision by: Scott VC

Keywords
- Administration

Medforth v Blake [1999] EWCA Civ 1482 is a UK insolvency law case concerning the duties of a receiver and manager in the United Kingdom, over and above a duty of good faith, as to the manner in which he conducts a business.

== Facts ==
Medforth conducted pig farming on a large scale, with a £2 million annual turnover and a herd of 3000 sows, 120 boars and 11000 weaners. His bank appointed receivers who ran the business from February 1984 to September 1988, when Medforth found a new source of finance and repaid the bank. Medforth advised the receivers that they could get large discounts from foodstuffs suppliers, amounting to £1000 a week, which he had previously been able to obtain, but the receivers did not attempt to obtain any such discount until early 1988. In February 1990, Medforth sued them for failure to obtain such commercial discounts either as breach of a duty of care, or if the only duty was that of good faith, such a breach (even though it did not arise from any deceit or of any conscious or deliberate impropriety).

In the Queen's Bench Division, McGonigal J ruled:

1. the Receivers, when exercising their power of sale, owed Mr Medforth, over and above a duty of good faith, an equitable duty of care,
2. the standard of that duty of care was the standard of a reasonably competent receiver
3. no sensible distinction could be drawn between the exercise of a power of sale and the exercise of a power to manage a business, that the power to manage was ancillary to the power of sale and that the equitable duty of care was applicable to both

The receivers appealed to the Court of Appeal.

== Judgment ==
The Court of Appeal dismissed the receivers' appeal and held that the duty of care in equity was breached. Scott VC, drawing upon jurisprudence established in such prior cases as Cuckmere Brick Co v Mutual Finance and Downsview Nominees Ltd v First City Corporation Ltd, summarised the law as follows.

...The duties imposed on a mortgagee in possession, and on a mortgagee exercising his powers whether or not in possession, were introduced in order to ensure that a mortgagee dealt fairly and equitably with the mortgagor. The duties of a receiver towards the mortgagor have the same origin. They are duties in equity imposed in order to ensure that a receiver, while discharging his duties to manage the property with a view to repayment of the secured debt, nonetheless in doing so takes account of the interests of the mortgagor and others interested in the mortgaged property. These duties are not inflexible. What a mortgagee or a receiver must do to discharge them depends upon the particular facts of the particular case. A want of good faith or the exercise of powers for an improper motive will always suffice to establish a breach of duty. What else may suffice will depend upon the facts.

[...]

In my judgment, in principle and on the authorities, the following propositions can be stated:-

(1) A receiver managing mortgaged property owes duties to the mortgagor and anyone else with an interest in the equity of redemption. (2) The duties include, but are not necessarily confined to, a duty of good faith. (3) The extent and scope of any duty additional to that of good faith will depend on the facts and circumstances of the particular case. (4) In exercising his powers of management the primary duty of the receiver is to try and bring about a situation in which interest on the secured debt can be paid and the debt itself re-paid. (5) Subject to that primary duty, the receiver owes a duty to manage the property with due diligence. (6) Due diligence does not oblige the receiver to continue to carry on a business on the mortgaged premises previously carried on by the mortgagor.

(7) If the receiver does carry on a business on the mortgaged premises, due diligence requires reasonable steps to be taken in order to try to do so profitably.

However, McGonigal J's ruling, while essentially correct, required some minor qualifications:

- the power to manage a business is independent of the power to sell, but, in the management of the business, an equitable duty of care is owed
- the breach of a duty of good faith should, in this area as in all others, require some dishonesty or improper motive, or some other element of bad faith, to be established

Swinton Thomas LJ and Tuckey LJ concurred.

== Significance ==
Medforth revised the position previously taken by the Privy Council in Downsview Nominees, where a receiver's duty of care to the company was limited to a requirement that he take reasonable steps to obtain a proper price on the exercise of his power of sale. The Court of Appeal effectively stated that:

- a receiver owes an equitable duty of skill and care to the debtor company, should he decide to continue trading,
- so long as this does not conflict with his fiduciary duty to act in the interests of the debentureholder.

== See also ==
- UK insolvency law
