= Walton v Independent Living Organisation =

- Court: Court of Appeal
- Decided: 26 February 2003
- Citations: [2003] EWCA Civ 199, [2003] ICR 688, [2003] IRLR 469

Court membership
- Judges sitting: Aldous LJ, Arden LJ and Jacob J

Keywords
- Minimum wage, care worker

Walton v Independent Living Organisation [2003] EWCA Civ 199 is a UK labour law case regarding the National Minimum Wage Act 1998.

== Facts ==
Miss Julie Walton was a care worker, who looked after Miss E Jones, who had epilepsy but was a relatively easy client. She did washing, ironing, shopping and meals. Miss Walton was required to remain at work for 24 hours a day, and did three days a week. She was paid £31.40 a day and got allowance for meals and sleeping was free when she was with Miss Jones. The National Minimum Wage Team of the Inland Revenue contacted the company about a complaint. The employment agency sent in Miss Butler to do estimates about Miss Walton's hours of work and concluded her tasks took 6 hours and 50 minutes a day. Ms Walton agreed with this, and signed an agreement that this was in fact her hours of work.

Tribunal held that her time was ‘unmeasured’, and that the estimation was an agreement of time for the purpose of NMWR 1999 r 28, even though her whole pay was expressed on a daily basis. Therefore, she was paid £4.60 which was over the minimum wage.

== Judgment ==
Aldous LJ upheld the Tribunal. They had come to an agreement about the average hours of work. Arden LJ said it was a question of fact whether the worker did ‘only stand and wait’ and here she did not, and was able to do something entirely unrelated while at work. Jacob J concurred.

== See also ==
- UK labour law
