= Tse Kwong Lam v Wong Chit Sen =

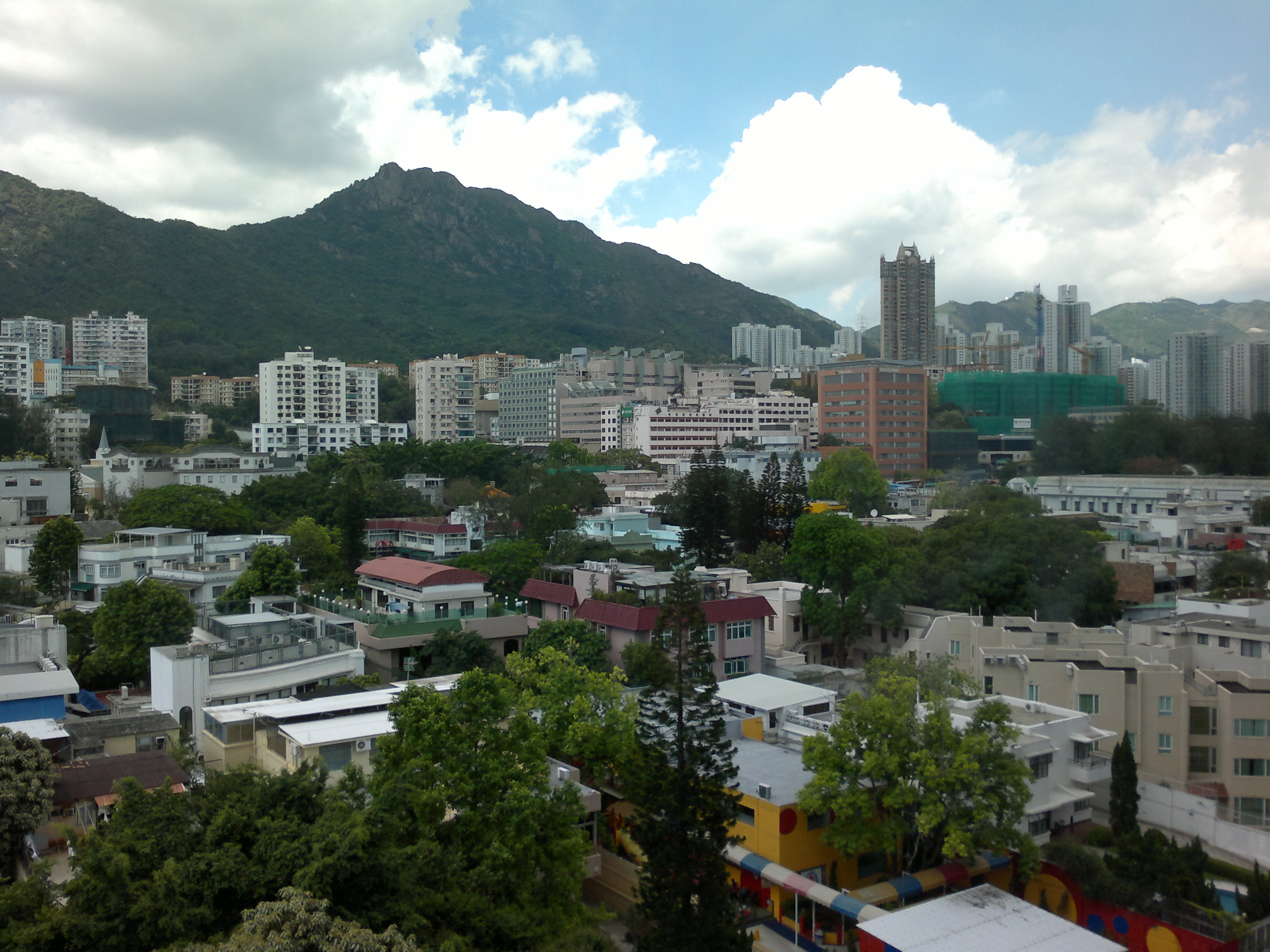
- Court: Privy Council
- Decided: 25 July 1983
- Citations: Tse Kwong Lam v Wong Chit Sen [1983] UKPC 28, [1983] 3 All ER 54

Case history
- Prior actions: Wong Chit-Sen v Tse Kwong-Lam [1979] HKCFI 39 Supreme Court of Hong Kong; Tse Kwong Lam v Wong Chit Sen [1980] HKCA 264 Court of Appeal of Hong Kong
- Subsequent action: Tse Kwong Lam v Wong Chit Sen [1984] HKCFI 309 Supreme Court of Hong Kong

Court membership
- Judges sitting: Lord Fraser Of Tullybelton, Lord Brandon Of Oakbrook, Lord Brightman, Lord Templeman & Sir John Megaw

Keywords
- Mortgage

Tse Kwong Lam v Wong Chit Sen [1983] UKPC 28 is a land law case, concerning the rights and obligations of a mortgagee in the exercise of his power of sale under a mortgage.

== Facts ==
Mr Wong (Chinese: 黃直生) exercised his power of sale and put up Mr Tse’s (Chinese: 謝廣林) property for auction, a building with about 100 units in Kowloon, the Kwong Hing Building. It was only shortly advertised with limited details. The reserve price was fixed without the guidance of a qualified valuer at $1.2m. There was only one bid. It was Mrs Wong. She was acting on behalf of the company owned by Mr Wong and his family. They had apparently had a board meeting before resolving that they would bid up to a maximum of $1.2m.

The trial Judge found that $1.2m was not a proper price, but refused to set the sale aside because of the borrower’s delay in pursuing the counterclaim. He awarded damages instead. The Court of Appeal set aside the judge’s award.

== Judgment ==
The Privy Council restored the judge’s award, holding that although the sale could not be set aside, given that too long was taken, damages could be awarded. There was a clear conflict of interest here, importing a necessity to show that reasonable precautions had been taken to get the best price. The Board advised that although the respondent was free to sell to a company in which he was interested, he had failed to demonstrate he had taken reasonable care in the conduct of the sale. An auction was not necessarily the most appropriate mode of sale. Expert advice should have been sought for valuing and the sale mode. Lord Templeman said:

... the sale must be closely examined and a heavy onus lies on the mortgagee to show that in all respects he acted fairly to the borrower and used his best endeavours to obtain the best price reasonably obtainable for the mortgaged property.

== See also ==
- English land law
- English trusts law
- English property law
- York Buildings Co v MacKenzie (1795) 3 Paton 378
