= Terrell on the Law of Patents =

United Kingdom patent law treatise

- Subject: Patent Law
- ISBN: 9780414119284

Terrell on the Law of Patents is a United Kingdom patent law treatise of the twentieth century.

== See also ==
- Sir William Aldous
