= Fujitsu's Application =

- Court: Court of Appeal
- Full case name: In the Matter of Application No. 9204959.2 by Fujitsu Limited
- Decided: March 6, 1997
- Citation: [1997] EWCA Civ 1174

Case history
- Appealed from: High Court of Justice

Court membership
- Judges sitting: Leggatt LJ, Roch LJ, Aldous LJ

Keywords
- Patent law; Software patent; Patentability

Fujitsu's Application [1997] EWCA Civ 1174 is a 6 March 1997 judgment by the Court of Appeal of England and Wales. The judges' decision was to confirm the refusal of a patent by the United Kingdom Patent Office and by Mr Justice Laddie in the High Court. Lord Justice Aldous heard the appeal before the Court of Appeal.

== Facts ==
Fujitsu's claimed invention was a new tool for modelling crystal structures on a computer. A scientist wishing to investigate what would result if he made a new material consisting of a combination of two existing compounds would enter data representing those compounds and how they should be joined into the computer. The computer then automatically generated and displayed the new structure using the data supplied. Previously, the same effect could only have been achieved by assembling plastic models by hand - a time-consuming task.

== Discussion ==
- UK courts should look to the decisions of the European Patent Office for guidance in interpreting the exclusions.
- A "technical contribution" is needed to make a potentially excluded thing patentable, proclaiming that this was a concept at the heart of patent law and referring to the European Patent Office's decision in T 208/84, VICOM.
- There is a difficulty inherent in determining what is and is not "technical", such that each case should be decided on its own facts.
- The substance of an invention should be used to assess whether or not a thing is patentable, not the form in which it is claimed. Thus a non-patentable method cannot be patented under the guise of an apparatus.

== Judgment ==
The claimed invention was certainly a useful tool. However, as claimed, the invention was nothing more than a conventional computer which automatically displayed a crystal structure shown pictorially in a form that would in the past have been produced as a model. The only advance expressed in the claims was the computer program which enabled the combined structure to be portrayed more quickly. The new tool therefore provided nothing that went beyond the normal advantages that are obtained by the use of a computer program. Thus, there was no technical contribution and the application was rejected as being a computer program as such.

== See also ==
- List of judgments of the UK Courts relating to excluded subject matter
- Software patents under United Kingdom patent law
- Software patents under the European Patent Convention
