= William Aldous =

English judge (1936–2018)

The Right Honourable Sir William Aldous

Lord Justice of Appeal
- In office 1995–2003

Justice of the High Court
- In office 1988–1995

Personal details
- Born: 17 March 1936 United Kingdom
- Died: 17 March 2018 (aged 82)
- Spouse: Gill Henson

Sir William Aldous (17 March 1936 – 17 March 2018) was an English judge and a judge in the Gibraltar Court of Appeal.

== Biography ==
Born in Suffolk, Aldous was the son of barrister Guy Aldous QC and his wife, Gill Henson, daughter of Gino Henson, MFH, Master of the Blankney Hunt. Growing up in East Anglia, Aldous was a keen and eager huntsman from an early age. His father was MFH of the Essex and Suffolks, a responsibility that he passed onto Willie Aldous in 1970. He ceased hunting for real in 1976 to rejoin a serious career as a London barrister. Aldous achieved considerable success in the practice of intellectual property law that took him all the way to the bench of the Patents Court.

William Aldous was head of barristers' chambers at 6 Pump Court Chambers, Inner Temple from 1980 to 1988. In 1988 he was appointed to the High Court bench and assigned to the Patents Court of the Chancery Division. In January 1993 his judgment reflected a trend towards the freedom to publish. The Home Office had claimed copyright over tapes of serial killer, Dennis Nilsen in the possession of World In Action. Charles Tremayne of Granada Television, described Aldous's decision to allow broadcast as "welcome and surprising".

He was made a Lord Justice of Appeal in 1995 and was sworn a member of the Privy Council.

He retired from the bench in October 2003 and became an arbitrator in intellectual property arbitrations. He was a member of the Gibraltar Court of Appeal. In March 2009 he dissented from other Court of Appeal judges, in giving the opinion that the Gibraltar Government's housing allocation policy discriminated against same-sex couples.

Sir William Aldous died on 17 March 2018, his 82nd birthday.

== Judgments ==
Judgments of Aldous in the Court of Appeal of England and Wales include:

- Fujitsu's Application - Patent law confirming the rejection of a patent involving the computerisation of an existing process.
- British Telecommunications plc v One in a Million Ltd - Intellectual property case in which Aldous identified domain names usurping a trademarked name as "an instrument of fraud"
- Walton v Independent Living Organisation - UK labour law, regarding the National Minimum Wage Act 1998
- Dubai Aluminium Co Ltd v Salaam - English vicarious liability case, concerning also breach of trust and dishonest assistance. Aldous's decision was reversed in the House of Lords
- Silven Properties Ltd v Royal Bank of Scotland plc - English land law case, concerning the behaviour of receivers appointed under mortgages.
- Macmillan Inc v Bishopsgate Investment Trust plc (No 3) [1996] WLR 387 - determining the proper law for priority of claims to foreign shares mortgaged in England.

== Bibliography ==
- with Thomas Terrell, Guy Aldous and Douglas Falconer, Terrell on the law of patents, 11th ed., Sweet & Maxwell, 1965.
- with Thomas Terrell, Douglas Falconer and David Young, Terrell on the law of patents, 12th ed., Sweet & Maxwell, 1971, ISBN 0-421-14650-8.
- with Thomas Terrell, Terrell on the Law of Patents, 13th ed., Sweet & Maxwell, Ltd (January 1982), ISBN 0-421-24900-5.

== Arms ==
Coat of arms of William Aldous

Crest
A parrot as in the arms charged on the dexter wing with an annulet Or.
Escutcheon
Argent between three parrots rising Gules on a chief Sable as many mullets of the first piereced.
