= Robin Jacob =

English judge (born 1941)

The Right Honourable Sir Robin Jacob

Lord Justice of Appeal
- In office 1993–2011

Sir Hugh Laddie Chair, UCL Faculty of Laws
- Incumbent
- Assumed office 2011
- Preceded by: Hugh Laddie

Personal details
- Born: Robert Raphael Hayim Jacob; 26 April 1941 (age 85)
- Occupation: Jurist
- Website: www.ucl.ac.uk/laws/people/sir-robin-jacob

Sir Robert Raphael Hayim Jacob, PC (born 26 April 1941), known as Robin Jacob, is a former judge in the Court of Appeal of England and Wales.

== Personal life ==
Jacob's father was Sir Jack Jacob, a Senior Master of the High Court who is well known for editing the White Book on civil procedure in the UK.

== Education and professional career ==
He read Natural Sciences (physics) at Trinity College, Cambridge (1960–1963) and law at the London School of Economics (1963–1967). He was called to the bar by Gray's Inn in 1965 (Treasurer 2007). From 1976 to 1981, he was the Junior Counsel for the Comptroller of Patents and for Government departments in intellectual property. He took silk in 1981. In 1993, he was appointed a High Court judge (a designated Patent Judge) and to the Court of Appeal in 2003.

His primary area of expertise is intellectual property rights. He was admitted to the IP Hall of Fame in 2006. He was awarded the Outstanding Achievement in IP award by MIP in 2012. The position he held before includes member of the Scientific and advisory board of the European Patent Office and the European Commission's Expert Group on the development and implications of patent law in the field of biotechnology and genetic engineering. He is the President of the Intellectual Property Judges’ Association (the association of European IP, particularly patent, judges) and the chairman of the advisory board concerning appointment and training of Judges to the Preparatory Committee for the Unified Patent Court (and also a member of the committee's Expert Panel).

He retired from the Court of Appeal in March 2011 (acknowledged in a valedictory address before a court-room packed with well-wishers) to take up his current position as the Sir Hugh Laddie Chair in Intellectual Property Law at the Institute of Brand and Innovation Law (IBIL), University College London. However, in accordance with section 9 of the Senior Courts Act 1981, he has continued on occasion since that date to sit as a judge in the High Court and the Court of Appeal until April 2015. Jacob is currently a door tenant at 8 New Square Chambers.

In 2018, Jacob took up the post of a Justice at the Astana International Financial Centre in the capital of Kazakhstan.

== Selected cases in which Jacob appeared as counsel ==
- Interlego AG v Tyco Industries (Hong Kong) [1988] UKPC 3 - in which he successfully argued that designs for Lego's bricks were not protected by copyright
- Smith Kline & French Laboratories v Evans Medical [1989] 1 FSR 561 - in which it was held that private acts can infringe upon a patent if they are done for commercial purposes
- Lux Traffic Controls v Pike Signals [1993] RPC 107 - it was held that a prototype tested publicly such that an observer would be able be to figure out how it worked would be disclosed, and thus constitute prior art

== Judgments ==
=== High Court ===
- Henry Brothers (Magherafelt) Ltd v Ministry of Defence [1997] RPC 693 - concerning a patent for a prefabricated blast-proof building designed for use in Northern Ireland during the Troubles
- Mars UK v Teknowledge [1999] EWHC 226 (Pat) - where he held that the mere fact of encryption will not make information confidential for the purposes of the action for breach of confidence

=== Court of Appeal ===
- Walton v Independent Living Organisation [2003] EWCA Civ 199, [2003] ICR 688, [2003] IRLR 469 - UK labour law, regarding the National Minimum Wage Act 1998
- Reed Executive Plc & Anor v Reed Business Information Ltd & Ors [2004] EWCA Civ 159 - UK trademark law, on the test of confusion
- Hyperion Records v Dr Lionel Sawkins [2005] EWCA Civ 565 - concerning copyright in unfinished works by Lalande that had been completed by the claimant
- IDA v University of Southampton [2006] EWCA Civ 145 - concerning a patent for a cockroach trap
- Pozzoli SPA v BDMO SA and others [2007] FSR 37 - he set out the prevailing test for inventive step, reformulating the test set out by Oliver LJ in the Windsurfing case
- Aerotel Ltd v Telco Holdings Ltd [2007] RPC 7 - UK patent law, regarding the excluded subject-matter (software) in the UK patent law
- European Central Bank v Document Security Systems [2007] EWCA Civ 192 - notable for the graphical illustration of the importance of consistency in interpreting patent claims in relation to validity and infringement:
  ... Professor Mario Franzosi likens a patentee to an Angora cat. When validity is challenged, the patentee says his patent is very small: the cat with its fur smoothed down, cuddly and sleepy. But when the patentee goes on the attack, the fur bristles, the cat is twice the size with teeth bared and eyes ablaze.
- Procter & Gamble Co v Reckitt Benckiser (UK) Ltd [2007] EWCA Civ 936 - UK design law
- Jacob gave the leading judgment in DWF LLP v Secretary of State for Business Innovation and Skills (acting for the Insolvency Service), "at the invitation of Arden LJ".

== Publications ==
- A Guidebook to Intellectual Property: Patents, Trade Marks, Copyright and Designs (6th edn, 2013)
- "Is IP out of control?" (2020) 15(2) Journal of Intellectual Property Law and Practice 98

== Arms ==
Coat of arms of Robin Jacob

Notes
Displayed on a painted panel at Gray's Inn.
Crest
On three grieces Gules Vert and Or a dove displayed proper crowned with an eastern crown and suspended from the neck a wreath of laurel Or.
Escutcheon
Gules between two flaunches barry of ten Or and Vert a lion rampant crowned with an eastern crown Or and holding in his dexter gamb branch of laurel sans fructs Vert.
