= York Buildings Co v MacKenzie =

- Court: House of Lords
- Citation: (1795) 8 Bro 42, (1795) 3 ER 432

Keywords
- Conflict of interest

York Buildings Co v MacKenzie (1795) 3 ER 432 is an English trusts law case concerning the duty of a fiduciary to act in the beneficiaries' interests, without entering any conflict of interest.

== Facts ==
The York Buildings Co was insolvent. Its estates (land in Widdrington, a lease of Strontian Mines, and some bonds and annuities) had been sold to pay creditors. Mr MacKenzie had bought some at a public judicial auction in February 1779, and the sale was confirmed by the Court of Session after several months. Mr MacKenzie then spent substantial sums of money improving the buildings. The York Buildings Co then sought a declaration that the sale be set aside, on the ground that Mr MacKenzie had been an agent and solicitor of the court during the previous proceedings.

Counsel for the appellants outlined the conventional position of the function of fiduciary responsibility in his submissions.

He that is entrusted with the interest of others, cannot be allowed to make the business an object of interest to himself; because from the frailty of nature, one who has the power, will be too readily seized with the inclination to use the opportunity for serving his own interest at the expense of those for whom he is entrusted...

The danger of temptation, from the facility and advantages for doing wrong, which a particular situation affords, does, out of the mere necessity of the case, work a disqualification; nothing less than incapacity being able to shut the door against temptation where the danger is imminent, and the security against discovery great, as it must be where the difficulty of prevention or remedy is inherent to the very situation which creates the danger... The wise policy of the law has therefore put the sting of a disability into the temptation as a defensive weapon against the strength of the danger which lies in the situation.

It is of no moment what the particular name or description, whether of character or office, situation or position, is, on which the disability attaches... [for it applies] to all the acts of tutors and guardians, factors, trustees, and all who are akin to a trust by any connection of character or office...

It is needless to enter into refinements or niceties as to the nature of trusts, or the specific name of trustee. There is no magic in the term: He is a trustee (in technical style) who is vested with property in trust for others; but every man has a trust, to whom a business is committed by another, or the charge and care of any concern is confided or delegated by commission.

== Judgment ==
The House of Lords held that an agent or solicitor of creditors of a bankrupt owed trustee-like fiduciary duties. So a purchase by him of part of a bankrupt's estate was liable to be set aside when the circumstances showed any impropriety or negligent conduct.

== See also ==
- Keech v Sandford (1726) Sel. Cas. T. King 61; 25 E.R. 223;
- Whelpdale v Cookson (1747) 1 Ves. Sen. 9; 27 E.R. 856;
