= Hugh Laddie =

British judge (1946–2008)

Sir Hugh Laddie

High Court Judge
- In office 1995–2005

Sir Hugh Laddie Chair
- In office 2006–2008
- Succeeded by: Robin Jacob

Personal details
- Occupation: Jurist

Hugh Ian Lang Laddie (15 April 1946 – 28 November 2008) was a judge of the High Court of England and Wales. He was a leader in the field of intellectual property law. He was co-author of the Modern Law of Copyright (1980).

Laddie was educated at Aldenham School and St Catharine's College, Cambridge. He studied medicine but changed to law. He became a barrister in 1969. He is credited with having developed the idea of applying for an Anton Piller order while still a junior. After 25 years at the bar, he was appointed a High Court judge in April 1995, and was assigned to the Chancery Division, as one of the Patents Court judges.

He resigned from his post as a judge in 2005, "because he found it boring" and felt isolated on the bench. He became a consultant for Willoughby & Partners, a boutique law firm, UK legal arm of Rouse & Co International, a move which was criticised by some. He was thought to be the first High Court judge to resign voluntarily in 35 years, and the first subsequently to join a firm of solicitors. No one since Sir Henry Fisher, in 1970, had resigned from the bench.

He was appointed to a Chair in Intellectual Property Law at University College London, with effect from 1 September 2006. He founded there the Institute of Brand and Innovation Law. The Sir Hugh Laddie chair in Intellectual Property has subsequently been established at UCL.

== Personal life ==
Hugh Laddie married Stecia Zamet in 1970. He died of cancer on 28 November 2008, aged 62.
