= Software patents under United Kingdom patent law =

There are four overriding requirements for a patent to be granted under United Kingdom patent law. Firstly, there must have been an invention. That invention must be novel, inventive and susceptible of industrial application. (See Patentability.)

Patent laws in the UK and throughout Europe specify a non-exhaustive list of excluded things that are not regarded as inventions to the extent that a patent application relates to the excluded thing as such. This list includes programs for computers.

Despite this, the United Kingdom Intellectual Property Office (UKIPO) regularly grants patents to inventions that are partly or wholly implemented in software. The extent to which this should be done under the current law and the approach to be used in assessing whether a patent application describes an invention has been settled by the Court of Appeal. The UK approach is quite different from that of the European Patent Office (EPO), although "there should be no significant difference in result."

Globally, the extent to which patent law should allow the granting of patents involving software (often referred to as "software patents") is controversial and also hotly debated (see Software patent debate).

== Substantive law ==
Although it is an implicit requirement of Section 1(1) of the UK's Patents Act 1977 that patents should only be granted for inventions, "invention" is not defined anywhere in the Act.

Instead, Section 1(2) Patents Act provides a non-exhaustive list of "things" that are not treated as inventions. Included in this list is "a program for a computer". However, these things are only prevented from being treated as inventions "to the extent that a patent or application for a patent relates to that thing as such".

Article 52(2) of the European Patent Convention (EPC) includes a slightly different list of non-inventions, although "programs for computers" are present. Article 52(3) EPC then states that patentability for the identified subject matter or activities is excluded "only to the extent to which a European patent application or European patent relates to such subject-matter or activities as such".

The wording of the Patents Act is slightly different from Article 52 EPC, but the UK Courts have taken the view that since the purpose of Section 1 of the Patents Act was to transpose the requirements of Article 52 EPC into UK law, any differences between the EPC and the Patents Act should be ignored. The text of the EPC itself should therefore be regarded as definitive.

Other things that are not regarded as inventions include mathematical methods, and schemes, rules and methods for performing mental acts, playing games or doing business. These additional excluded categories often overlap with the exclusion of computer programs since they may be put into practice using a computer.

== Case law ==
=== Summary ===
The case law in the United Kingdom relating to excluded subject matter in general, and computer programs specifically, has a somewhat sporadic history. For eight years, the leading case in the UK over whether or not a patent or patent application involving the use of a computer program related to an invention, or whether it instead related to a computer program "as such" was the judgment in Fujitsu's application from 1997.

Only in 2005, in the judgment in CFPH LLC's applications, did the UK Courts again consider the issue of excluded subject matter in detail. In the meantime, the practice of the EPO and the UKIPO had diverged significantly. In some ways this judgment brought UK law closer to the practice of the EPO; but it also criticised the reliance of the EPO on paraphrasing the exclusions from patentability under the blanket heading of "technical".

Subsequently, in October 2006, the Court of Appeal heard their first case relating to the validity of computer programs in nine years and handed down their judgment on the matter of Aerotel v Telco and Macrossan's Application. This judgment reaffirmed the reasoning in Fujitsu and once again moved the practice of the UKIPO away from that of the EPO.

=== Court of Appeal judgments ===
==== Fujitsu's Application ====
Fujitsu's Application was considered by the Court of Appeal in 1997. The case in question had been refused by the UKIPO and by J Laddie on Appeal before the High Court. LJ Aldous heard the appeal before the Court of Appeal and his judgment is notable for several reasons:

- It stated that the UK courts should look to the decisions of the European Patent Office for guidance in interpreting the exclusions.
- It confirmed that a "technical contribution" is needed to make a potentially excluded thing patentable, proclaiming that this was a concept at the heart of patent law and referring to the European Patent Office's decision in T 208/84, VICOM.
- It recognised the difficulty inherent in determining what is and is not "technical", such that each case should be decided on its own facts.
- It stressed that the substance of an invention should be used to assess whether or not a thing is patentable, not the form in which it is claimed. Thus a non-patentable method cannot be patented under the guise of an apparatus.

Fujitsu's claimed invention was a new tool for modelling crystal structures on a computer. A scientist wishing to investigate what would result if he made a new material consisting of a combination of two existing compounds would enter data representing those compounds and how they should be joined into the computer. The computer then automatically generated and displayed the new structure using the data supplied. Previously, the same effect could only have been achieved by assembling plastic models by hand – a time consuming task. The claimed invention was therefore certainly new and useful, but the fact that the same task could be achieved manually in the past was the application's downfall. As claimed, the invention was nothing more than a conventional computer which automatically displayed a crystal structure shown pictorially in a form that would in the past have been produced as a model. The only advance expressed in the claims was the computer program which enabled the combined structure to be portrayed more quickly. The new tool therefore provided nothing that went beyond the normal advantages that are obtained by the use of a computer program. Thus, there was no technical contribution and the application was rejected as being a computer program as such.

==== Menashe v William Hill ====
Menashe Business Mercantile Limited v William Hill Organisation Limited was considered by the Court of Appeal in 2002. The case in question related to EP 0625760 and a preliminary question of infringement. Questions of validity were never considered by the court.

This case is important because it considers the issues surrounding the infringement of computer-implemented inventions where the computer performing the claimed method is outside the UK, but a person inside the UK is making use of the invention.

The claimed invention required there to be a host or server computer. According to the judgment, it did not matter where the host computer was situated. It could be in the United Kingdom, on a satellite, or even on the border between two countries. Its location was not important to the user of the invention nor to the claimed gaming system. In that respect, there was a real difference between the claimed gaming system and an ordinary machine. The judge therefore believed that it would be wrong to apply the old ideas of location to inventions of the type under consideration. A person who is situated in the United Kingdom who obtains in the United Kingdom a CD and then uses his terminal to address a host computer is not bothered where the host computer is located. It is of no relevance to him, the user, nor the patentee as to whether or not it is situated in the United Kingdom.

==== Aerotel v Telco and Macrossan's application ====
The judgment in Aerotel v Telco and Macrossan's application by the Court of Appeal, handed down on 27 October 2006, relates to a patent granted to Aerotel and a patent application filed by Neal Macrossan but refused by the UKIPO and the High Court. Aerotel's patent is GB 2171877, and has a January 1985 priority date. Macrossan's GB application 2388937 has a December 2000 priority date.

Aerotel's patent was found to relate to a patentable invention in principle because the system as a whole was new in itself, not merely because it is to be used for the business of selling phone calls. The judge felt that this was clearly more than just a method of doing business as such. The method claims were construed as relating to a use of the new system and were also deemed to relate to a patentable invention in principle.

The claimed invention in Macrossan's application was an automated method of acquiring the documents necessary to incorporate a company. Macrossan's patent application was rejected for not being an invention since it was found to relate to a computer program as such and to a method of doing business as such. The Court's reason for this rejection was that there was no contribution made by the claimed invention that lay outside excluded subject matter.

Citing as reasons this clear divergence in reasoning between the UK courts and the European Patent Office, Neal Macrossan sought leave to appeal the refusal of his patent application to the House of Lords. Within the patent profession it was hoped that a ruling by the House of Lords would clarify the extent to which patent protection is available to computer-implemented inventions. To the disappointment of patent attorneys, the House of Lords refused leave to hear the appeal, citing the reason that the case "does not raise an arguable point of law of general public importance".

=== High Court judgments ===
After the judgement in Fujitsu's Application, the courts did not hear another case relating to the exclusions to computer programs for eight years. The judgment in CFPH's applications was the first in a flurry of UK court cases starting in 2005 involving re-consideration by the High Court of patent applications refused by the UKIPO and made many references to the practice of the EPO.

Peter Prescott QC, sitting as a Deputy Judge in the High Court, noted that the EPO decisions are prescriptive, but not binding on the UK courts. With this in mind, the EPO's reliance on the word "technical" was criticised, but the judgment went on to say that the two modes of reasoning used by the UK courts and by the EPO, although different, would usually produce identical results on the same set of facts if properly applied. Another criticism suggests that the EPO are being too strict by insisting that an invention must provide a technical contribution to be inventive since, as evidenced by the judgment in Dyson v Hoover, the commercial background to an invention may be important when determining the presence or otherwise of an inventive step.

The two patent applications in question both involved networked interactive wagering on the outcomes of events. The applications were not refused as relating to a computer program as such, because the computer program was simply a tool that was being used to implement a new set of business rules and the invention was not really about the computer program. Rather the only "advance" (defined as being those features which were novel and inventive) was found to be the new set of business rules and each application was refused as relating to a method of doing business as such. Although the judgment stressed that the reasoning used was quite different from the type that would have been applied by the EPO, the judge appeared satisfied that the EPO would have come to the same conclusion using their own reasoning.

Although briefly of great importance due to the UKIPO swiftly altering their practice to follow its recommendations, the idea in the CFPH judgment to consider whether an invention is excluded by looking at the novel and inventive advance has been disapproved by the more recent Aerotel and Macrossan judgment. This judgment therefore remains of interest only from an historical perspective.

=== Patent Office decisions ===
Decisions of the UKIPO, made by senior Hearing Officers, are not binding on the UKIPO in the way that judgments of the Courts are. Nevertheless, there are, by nature, many more Office decisions than there are court judgments. A full list is available on the UKIPO website.

== UK Intellectual Property Office practice ==
On 2 November 2006, following the judgment in Aerotel v Telco and Macrossan's Application, the UKIPO issued a Practice Note announcing an immediate change in the way patent examiners will assess whether inventions relate to patentable subject matter. This practice is considered to be a restrictive interpretation of the judgment by patent attorneys.

One aspect of the practice change was a reversal in the UKIPO practice concerning computer program claims. For several years previously, the UKIPO had allowed claims directed to a computer program if the method performed by the computer program was itself patentable. In light of the first step of the Aerotel/Macrossan four-step test, to construe the claim, the UKIPO decided that claims to a computer program were not a permissible form of claim even if the underlying method was found to be patentable.

This practice remained in place until 7 February 2008 when, following the judgment in Astron Clinica and others' Applications, the UKIPO issued a new Practice Note stating that they would return to their previous practice of permitting claims to computer programs if claims to a method performed by running a suitably programmed computer or to a computer programmed to carry out the method were themselves allowable. This change affirmed the established practice of considering the substance of the invention over the particular way it was claimed but it was not thought that it would cause a material change in the subject matter which would be deemed patentable by the UKIPO.

== Comparison of EPO with UK practice ==
Patents granted by the European Patent Office (EPO) may be brought into effect in the UK once certain formal requirements have been met. As soon as a European patent is granted (provided that no opposition is filed), then final authority to interpret Article 52(2) and (3) EPC rests with each national jurisdiction and any person may apply to the UKIPO or the UK courts to have a patent granted by the EPO revoked in the UK.

There is to date no supranational European system for patent litigation, so the courts of each EPC Contracting State retain the final say. They vary to some extent from one to another as to just how far the exclusion should extend.

Compared to the EPO, the UKIPO have consistently taken a very different approach when deciding whether or not to grant patents involving software. This has sometimes drawn criticism from those advocating the need for harmony across Europe. (See Proposed directive on the patentability of computer-implemented inventions).

The most important difference between the two offices is that the EPO will in general accept that any patent application relating to a computer-implemented method is "an invention", whereas the UKPO will reject an application on the basis that it does not describe "an invention" if the only contribution provided by the inventor is a computer program. The EPO instead only consider technical features when assessing the presence or otherwise of an inventive step and will therefore normally reject the trivial computer-implementation of a non-technical method as lacking an inventive step. The UKPO, in contrast, consider any feature, technical or not, as being capable of contributing to an inventive step. (See Software patents under the European Patent Convention, which discusses the evolving position and practice of the EPO on this issue.)

Thus, for example, a patent application describing a new computer chip used to implement a faster method for calculating square-roots was rejected as not being an invention in the UK (Gale's Application), but would probably be deemed an invention in principle by the EPO. The EPO would instead consider whether the new method of solving square roots provided a technical solution to a technical problem and would only grant the application if such a solution were inventive.

It was noted by the Court of Appeal in Aerotel and Macrossan that using the reasoning of most of the EPO case law (such as T 258/03 – Hitachi) would result in the same final conclusion as the "contribution" approach. However, the reasoning in a particular Microsoft case was held up as being flawed. The UKPO have also expressed the opinion that the end result would normally be the same. This is disputed by groups such as the Foundation for a Free Information Infrastructure who consider that the EPO is consistently granting patents that would be refused by the courts in the UK and elsewhere in Europe.

== See also ==
- Software patent
- Software patents under the European Patent Convention
- List of UK judgments relating to excluded subject matter
