= Downsview Nominees Ltd v First City Corp Ltd =

- Court: Judicial Committee of the Privy Council
- Full case name: Downsview Mominees Ltd and J.G. Russell v. First City Corporation Ltd and First City Finance Ltd
- Decided: 19 November 1992
- Citations: [1992] UKPC 34 [1993] AC 295 [1993] 1 NZLR 513 [1993] 3 All ER 626 [1993] 2 WLR 86 [1994] 2 BCLC 49
- Transcript: BAILII

Case history
- Prior actions: Downsview Nominees Ltd v First City Corporation Ltd, [1990] NZCA 21, allowing in part an appeal from First Corporation Corporation Ltd v Downsview Nominees Ltd, [1989] NZHC 566
- Appealed from: Court of Appeal of New Zealand

Court membership
- Judges sitting: Lord Templeman, Lord Lane, Lord Goff of Chieveley, Lord Mustill, Lord Slynn of Hadley

Case opinions
- Decision by: Lord Templeman

Keywords
- Administration

Downsview Nominees Ltd v First City Corp Ltd [1992] UKPC 34, [1993] AC 295 (19 November 1992) is a New Zealand insolvency law case decided by the Judicial Committee of the Privy Council concerning the nature and extent of the liability of a mortgagee, or a receiver and manager, to a mortgagor or a subsequent debenture holder for his actions.

== Facts ==
Glen Eden Motors Ltd was a New Zealand company with Fiat and Mazda car selling franchises. It gave a first debenture, securing $230,000 to Westpac, having priority over a second debenture issued to First City Corporation Ltd ("FCC"). Both loans were secured by a floating charge over all assets, and each contained the power to appoint a receiver and manager (i.e., an administrative receiver), who would be deemed to be an agent of the company, authorized to do any acts which the company could perform.

Glen Eden defaulted on the debenture with FCC, and the latter appointed receivers. The receivers thought the business was unprofitable and should be closed down, and removed the manager of Glen Eden. The ousted manager consulted Russell on the matter. As a result, Downsview Nominees Ltd (controlled by Russell) was assigned Westpac's first debenture, and Russell became the receiver and manager under it. The ousted manager was reinstated, and First City's receivers were relegated to a residual role.

Fearing a poor outcome, First City then offered Downsview Nominees all moneys owing under the first debenture (so it would be redeemed and First City could take charge), or alternatively to sell its second debenture to Downsview on similar terms, but this offer was declined. Glen Eden issued a third debenture to Downsview and Russell carried on the business, losing a further $500,000. First City claimed that Russell (as receiver) and Downsview Nominees (as prior debenture holder) had violated their duties to First City to:

- exercise their powers for proper purposes
- act honest and in good faith
- exercise reasonable care, skill and diligence
- discharge the Westpac debenture as soon as they were in a position to do so
- transfer any surplus assets for First City after such satisfaction of that debenture.

== The courts below ==
After an initial order in January 1988 to transfer the Westpac debenture on terms (which Russell contested and sought to avoid), in August 1989, the High Court of New Zealand held that Russell and Downsview acted for their own purposes, and not for proper purposes, in the matter and were thus liable in negligence to First City. Russell was also prohibited from acting as a director, promoter or manager of any company for five years, under s. 189 of the Companies Act of New Zealand.

On appeal, the Court of Appeal of New Zealand quashed the High Court's order insofar as it related to Downsview and First City Finance (to which First City had assigned the second debenture), and also quashed the disqualification order against Russell, as the court did not have such jurisdiction under the Act.

On application to the Privy Council, Russell appealed the Court of Appeal's order against him, and First City cross-appealed against Russell and Downsview to have the High Court orders reinstated.

== Judgment ==
The Privy Council ruled that the High Court's order against Russell and Downsview should be restored, but upheld the quashing of the disqualification order against Russell.

In his ruling, Lord Templeman held that:

- Russell had been in breach of duty because he had not used his powers for a proper purpose, meeting the Managing Director's wishes.
- Downsview should have accepted First City's offer to redeem the debenture, and so First City should be compensated.
- This was not a negligence action. A general duty of care was not owed because this was "inconsistent with the right of the mortgagee and the duties which the courts applying equitable principles have imposed on the mortgagee." Yet the duty to act in good faith and for proper purposes was owed in equity:

Several centuries ago equity evolved principles… first, that a mortgage is security for the repayment of a debt and, secondly, that a security for repayment of a debt is only a mortgage. From these principles flowed two rules, first, that powers conferred on a mortgagee must be exercised in good faith for the purpose of obtaining repayment and secondly that, subject to the first rule, powers conferred on a mortgagee may be exercised although the consequences may be disadvantageous to the borrower. These principles apply also to a receiver and manager appointed by the mortgagee.’

[...]

But since a mortgage is only security for a debt, a receiver and manager commits a breach of duty if he abuses his powers by exercising them otherwise than ‘for the special purpose of enabling the assets comprised in the debenture holders’ security to be served and realised.’

[...] ab initio and throughout the receivership the second defendant [Russell] did not exercise his powers for proper purposes....

If a mortgagee exercises his power of sale in good faith for the purpose of protecting his security, he is not liable to the mortgagor even though he might have obtained a higher price and even though the terms might be regarded as disadvantageous to the mortgagor. is… authority… that, if the mortgagee decides to sell, he must take reasonable care to obtain a proper price but is no authority for any wider proposition....

The duties imposed by equity on a mortgagee and on a receiver and manager would be quite unnecessary if there existed a general duty in negligence to take reasonable care in the exercise of powers and to take reasonable care in dealing with the assets of the mortgagor company....

A mortgagee owes a general duty to subsequent encumbrances and to the mortgagor to use his powers for the sole purpose of securing repayments of the moneys owing under his mortgage and a duty to act in good faith.

== See also ==
- UK insolvency law
